= History of the Turks and Caicos Islands =

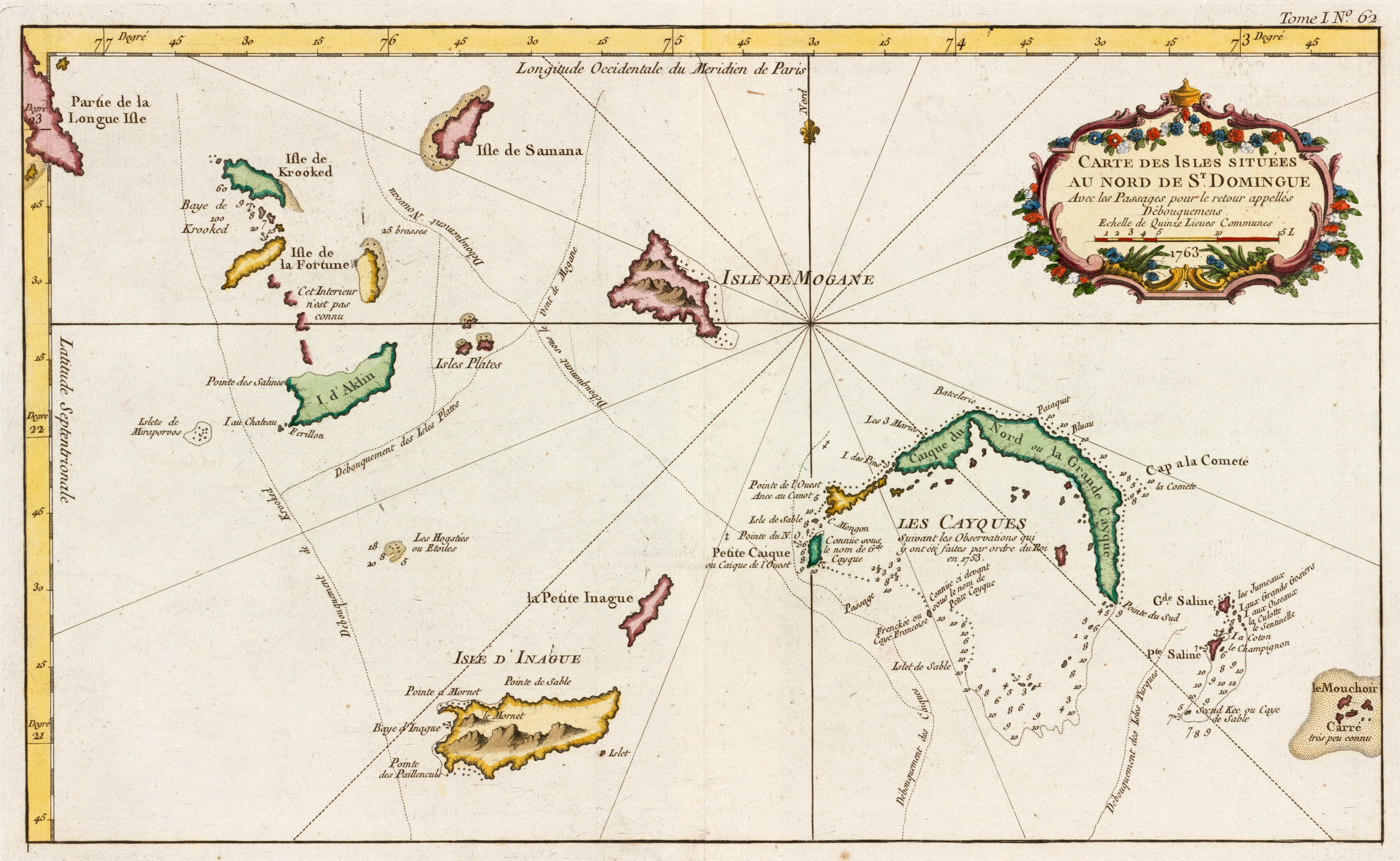
Turks and Caicos on a 1764 map by Jacques Nicolas Bellin

Before European colonization, the Turks and Caicos Islands were inhabited by Taíno and Lucayan peoples. The first recorded European sighting of the islands now known as the Turks and Caicos occurred in 1512. In the subsequent centuries, the islands were claimed by several European powers, with the British Empire eventually gaining control. For many years the islands were governed indirectly through Bermuda, the Bahamas, and Jamaica. When the Bahamas gained independence in 1973, the islands received their own governor, and have remained a separate autonomous British Overseas Territory since. In August 2009, the United Kingdom suspended the Turks and Caicos Islands' self-government following allegations of ministerial corruption. Home rule was restored in the islands after the November 2012 elections.

== Pre-colonial history ==
Long before Christopher Columbus first set foot on the capital island of Grand Turk during his discovery voyage of the new world in 1492, the islands of the Turks and Caicos were inhabited by Taíno and Lucayan peoples. These original settlers left a rich heritage of seafaring, salt raking and farming, which still lingers on today. Words such as "canoe", Caribbean and "caicos" are derived from the Arawak language. Even the name of the country comes from these earliest inhabitants. Turks is a reference to the indigenous Turk's head cactus and Caicos is from the Lucayan term "caya hico" meaning string of islands, words which entered the natives' language through an early colonist, Bernard Caicos.

For almost 700 years, the Taíno and Lucayan were the sole residents of the islands, settling mainly in Middle Caicos and Grand Turk. They lived peacefully and were skilled in farming, fishing and gardening. They cultivated almost 50 types of plants, some of which can still be found on undeveloped sections of the islands.

Another peculiarity that has been passed down through the generations is a love of shellfish, particularly conch – which is actually available in abundance to this day, thanks to the work of the Caicos Conch farm, the only commercial conch farm in the world. It closed after damages caused by Hurricane Irma and Hurricane Maria in 2017.

== Colonial history prior to settlement ==
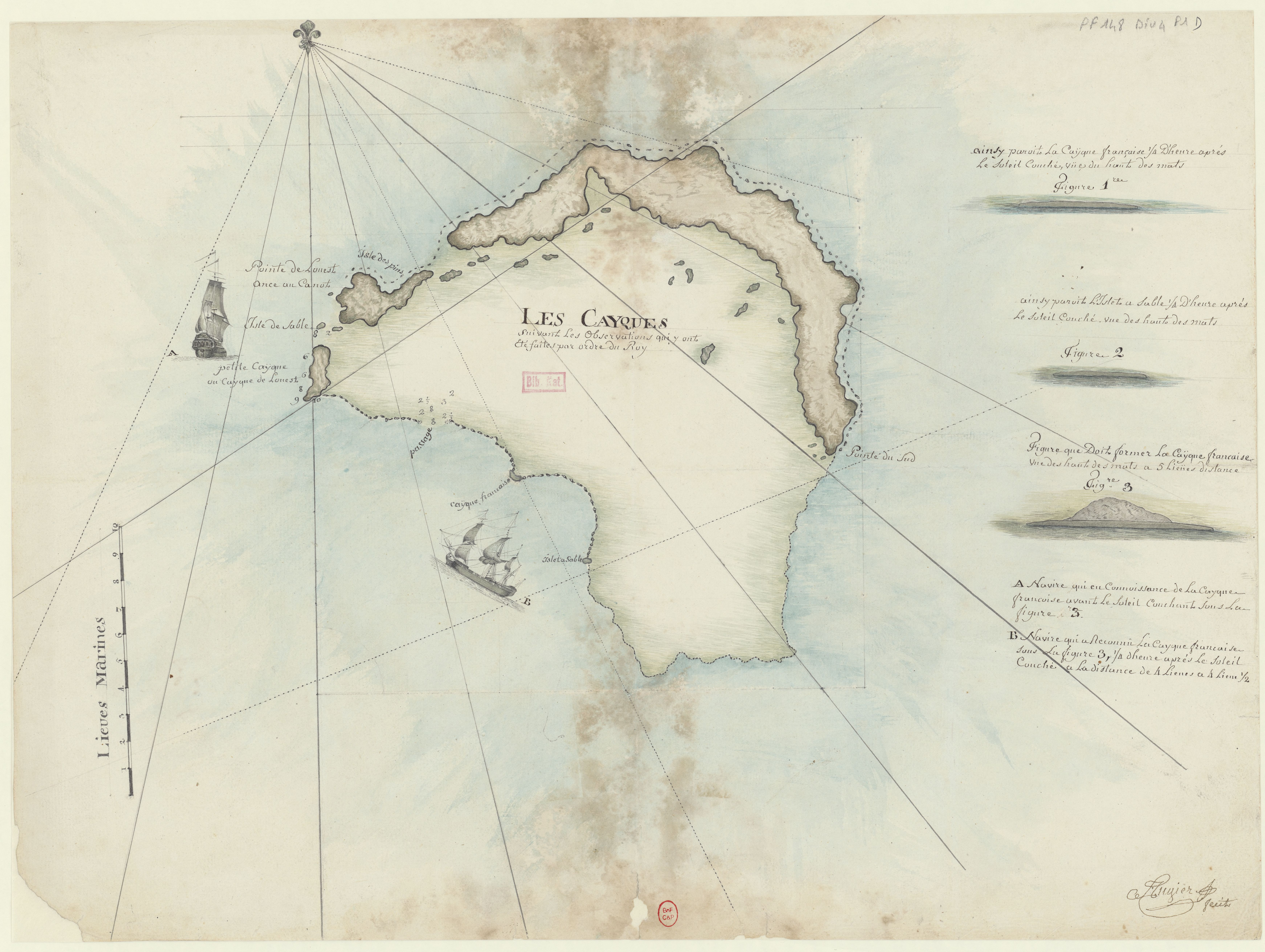
Caicos islands on a 1727 map by Amédée-François Frezier

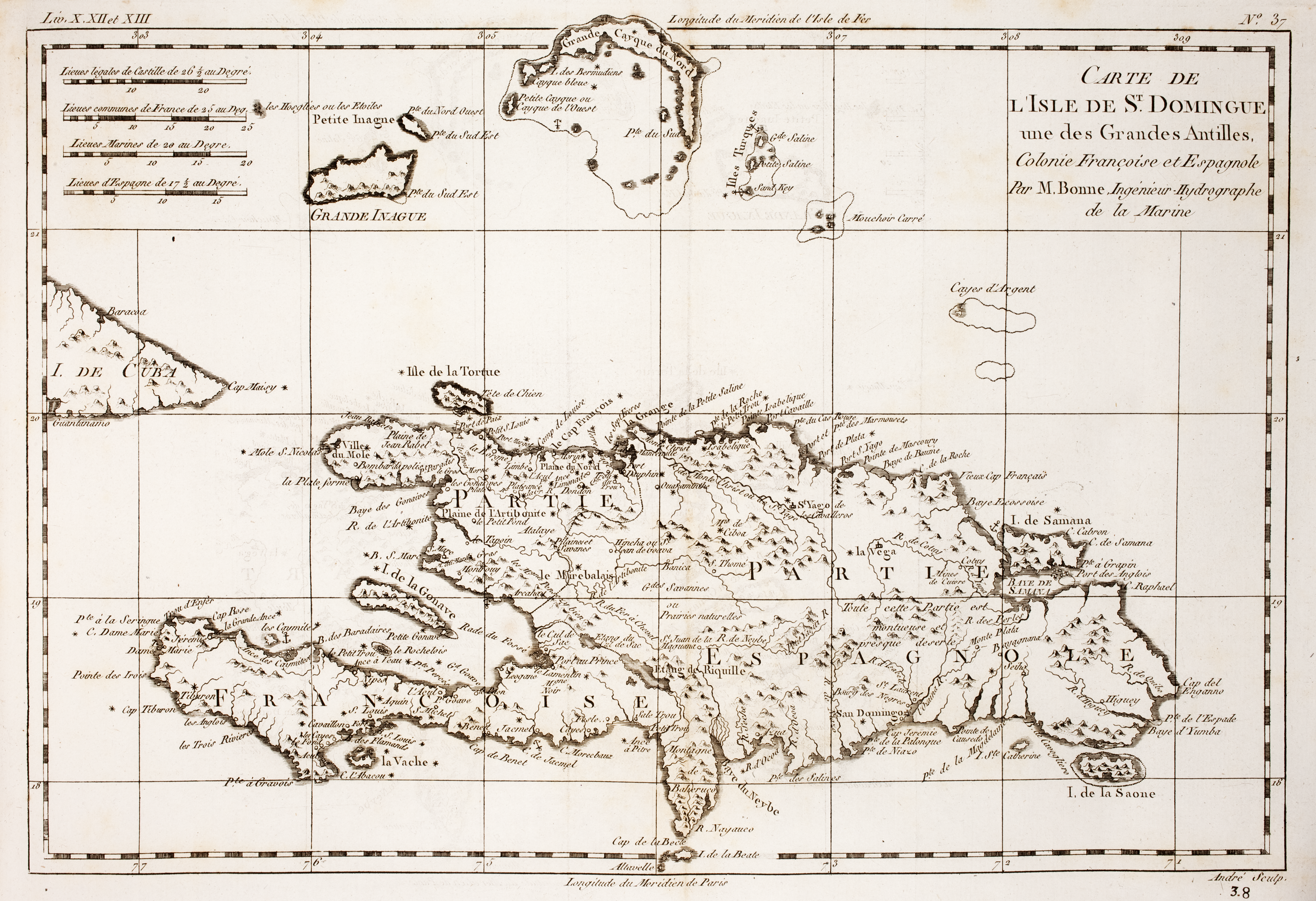
Turks and Caicos, north of Hispaniola, on a 1780 map by Rigobert Bonne

Shortly after Columbus arrived in 1492, the Lucayan civilization was killed through slavery and disease and the islands remained sparsely populated for about 30 years.

The island Caico[s] received its name from the Lucayan caya hico, meaning 'string of islands'. The Turks Islands were named after the Turk's cap cactus, Melocactus intortus, whose red cephalium resembles the fez hat worn by Turkish men in the late Ottoman Empire.

During the second half of the 16th century the salt making industry was born. Bermudians came to Turks and Caicos to rake the salt and take it back to Bermuda. Salt was a precious commodity back then as it was used for preserving food. The shallow waters surrounding the islands were ideal for salt raking but treacherous for nautical navigation and more than 1000 ships were wrecked during the journey to and from.

The first recorded European sighting of the islands now known as the Turks and Caicos occurred in 1512. During the 16th, 17th and 18th centuries, the islands passed from Spanish, to French, to English (subsequently British) control, but none of the three powers ever established any settlements. In 1709, an early British colonist, Bernard Caicos, settled on the island.

From about 1690 to 1720, pirates hid in the cays of the Turks and Caicos Islands, attacking Spanish treasure galleons en route to Spain from Cuba, Hispaniola, and the Spanish possessions in Central America and Peru. The islands were not fully colonised until 1681, when salt collectors from Bermuda built the first permanent settlement on Grand Turk Island.

The salt collectors were drawn by the shallow waters around the islands that made salt mining a much easier process than in Bermuda. They occupied the Turks only seasonally, for six months a year, however, returning to Bermuda when it was no longer viable to rake salt. Their colonization established the British dominance of the archipelago that has lasted into the present day. Huge numbers of trees were felled by the Bermudians to discourage rainfall that would adversely affect the salt mining operation. This deforestation has yet to be repaired. Most of the salt mined in the Turks and Caicos Islands was sold through Bermudian merchant houses on the American seaboard, including in Newfoundland where it was used for preserving cod.

The agricultural industry sprung up in the islands in the late 1780s after 40 Loyalists arrived after the end of the American Revolution, primarily from Georgia and South Carolina. Granted large tracts of land by the British government to make up for what they lost in the American colonies, the Loyalists imported well over a thousand slaves and planted vast fields of sisal, harvested for its stiff fibre used in making various products such as rope.

Though in the short term highly successful, the cotton industry quickly went into decline, with hurricanes and pests destroying many crops. Though a few of the former cotton magnates changed to salt mining, just about every one of the original Loyalists had left the islands by 1820, leaving their slaves to live a subsistence lifestyle through fishing and hunter-gathering.

== Bermudian century ==
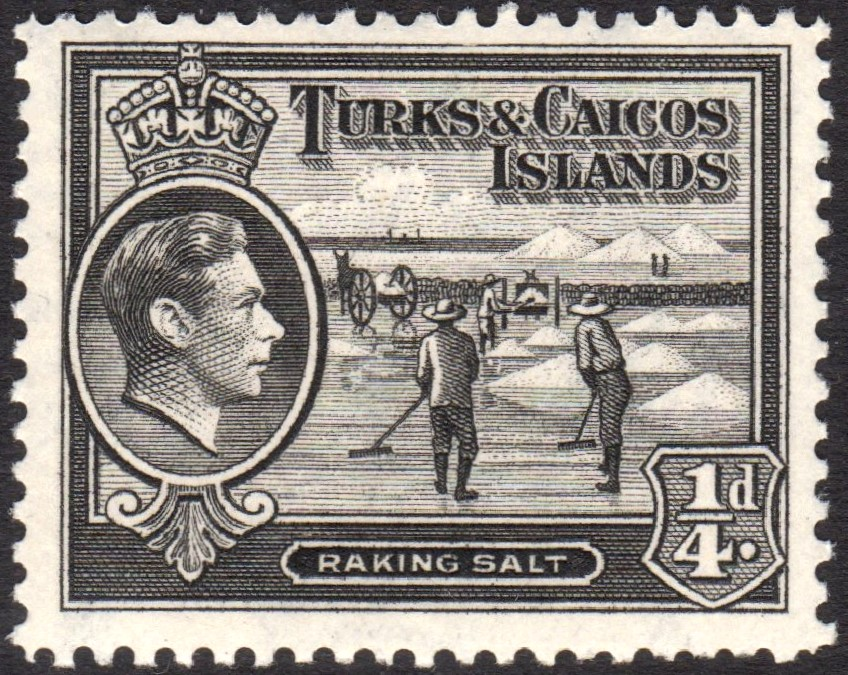
Raking salt on a 1938 postage stamp of the islands

In 1706, the French and the Spanish briefly captured the Turks and Caicos Islands from the Bermudians. Four years later the British reclaimed the islands for Bermuda but in subsequent years the place became primarily a haven for pirates and British Loyalists fleeing the American Revolution. Ultimately, Britain retained the island country by the end of the century as part of the Treaty of Versailles. In 1766, after being controlled by the Spanish, French and British, Turks and Caicos became part of the Bahamas colony and was placed under the Bahamian government. Attempts to integrate the two distinct communities failed and in 1874 after "the Great Bahamas Hurricane" devastated much of the chain of islands, the Turks & Caicos Islands became dependencies to the British Crown Colony of Jamaica.

Bermuda spent much of the 18th century in a protracted legal battle with the Bahamas (which had itself been colonised by Bermudian Puritans in 1647) over the Turks Islands. Under British law, no colony could hold colonies of its own. The Turks Islands were not recognised by Britain either as a colony in its own right, or as a part of Bermuda. They were held to be, like rivers in Britain, for the common use. As a result, there was a great deal of political turmoil surrounding the ownership of the Turks (and Caicos).

Spanish and French forces seized the Turks in 1706, but Bermudian forces expelled them four years later in what was probably Bermuda's only independent military operation. The Bermudian privateer, the Rose, under the command of Captain Lewis Middleton, attacked a Spanish and a French privateer holding a captive English vessel. Defeating the two enemy vessels, the Rose then cleared out the thirty-man garrison left by the Spanish and French.

A virtual state-of-war existed between Bermuda and the Bahamas through much of the 18th century. When the Bermudian sloop Seaflower was seized by the Bahamians in 1701, the response of Bermuda Governor Bennett was to issue letters-of-marque to Bermudians vessels. The legal struggle with the Bahamas began in 1766, when the King's representative in the Bahamas, Andrew Symmer, on his own authority, wrote a constitution which legislated for and taxed the Bermudians on the Turks. The Secretary of State, Lord Hillsborough, for the Crown, issued orders that the Bermudian activities on the Turks should not be obstructed or restrained in any way. As a result of this order, Symmer's constitution was dissolved. The Bermudians on the Turks appointed commissioners to govern themselves, with the assent of the King's local agent. They drew up regulations for good government, but the Bahamian governor Shirley drew up his own regulations for the Turks and ordered that no one might work at salt raking who had not signed assent to his regulations.

Following this, a raker was arrested and the salt pans were seized and divided by force. The Bahamas government attempted to appoint judicial authorities for the Turks in 1768, but these were refused by the Bermudians. In 1773 the Bahamian government passed an act attempting to tax the salt produced in the Turks, but the Bermudians refused to pay it. In 1774, the Bahamians passed another, similar act, and this they submitted for the Crown's assent. The Crown passed this act on to the Bermudian government which objected to it, and which rejected Bahamian jurisdiction over the Turks. The Crown, as a consequence, refused assent of the Act as applied to include the Turks, and, in the form in which it finally passed, the Bahamas, but not the Turks, were included.

The Bermudians on the Turks continued to be governed under their own regulations, with the assent of the royal agent, until 1780, when a more formal version of those regulations was submitted for the assent of the Crown, which was given. Those regulations, issued as a royal order, stated that all British subjects had the right ("free liberty") to rake and gather salt on the Turks, providing that they conformed to the regulations, which expressly rejected Bahamian jurisdiction over the Turks. Despite this refutation by a higher authority of their right to impinge upon Bermudian activities on the Turks, the Bahamian government continued to harass the Bermudians (unsurprisingly, given the lucrativeness of the Turks salt trade).

Although the salt industry on the Turks had largely been a Bermudian preserve, it had been seen throughout the 17th century as the right of all British subjects to rake there, and small numbers of Bahamians had been involved. In 1783, the French landed a force on Grand Turk which a British force of 100 men, under then-Captain Horatio Nelson, was unable to dislodge.

Following this, the Bahamians were slow to return to the Turks, while the Bermudians quickly resumed salt production, sending sixty to seventy-five ships to the Turks each year, during the six months that salt could be raked. Nearly a thousand Bermudians spent part of the year on the Turks engaged in salt production, and the industry became more productive.

The Bahamas, meanwhile, was incurring considerable expense in absorbing loyalist refugees from the now-independent American colonies, and returned to the idea of taxing Turks salt for the needed funds. The Bahamian government ordered that all ships bound for the Turk Islands obtain a license at Nassau first. The Bermudians refused to do this. Following this, Bahamian authorities seized the Bermuda sloops Friendship and Fanny in 1786. Shortly after, three Bermudian vessels were seized at Grand Caicos, with $35,000 worth of goods salvaged from a French ship. French privateers were becoming a menace to Bermudian operations in the area, at the time, but the Bahamians were their primary concern.

The Bahamian government re-introduced a tax on salt from the Turks, annexed them to the Bahamas, and created a seat in the Bahamian parliament to represent them. The Bermudians refused these efforts also, but the continual pressure from the Bahamians had a degrative effect on the salt industry. In 1806, the Bermudian customs authorities went some way toward acknowledging the Bahamian annexation when it ceased to allow free exchange between the Turks and Bermuda (this affected many enslaved Bermudians, who, like the free ones, had occupied the Turks only seasonally, returning to their homes in Bermuda after the year's raking had finished).

That same year, French privateers attacked the Turks, burning ships and absconding with a large sloop. The Bahamians refused to help, and the Admiralty in Jamaica claimed the Turks were beyond his jurisdiction. Two hurricanes, the first in August, 1813, the second in October, 1815, destroyed more than two-hundred buildings, significand salt stores, and sank many vessels. By 1815, the United States, the primary client for Turks salt, had been at war with Britain (and hence Bermuda) for three years, and had established other sources of salt.

With the destruction wrought by the storm, and the loss of market, many Bermudians abandoned the Turks, and those remaining were so distraught that they welcomed the visit of the Bahamian governor in 1819. The British government eventually assigned political control to the Bahamas, which the Turks and Caicos remained a part of until the 1840s.

One Bermudian salt raker, Mary Prince, however, was to leave a scathing record of Bermuda's activities there in The History of Mary Prince, a book which helped to propel the abolitionist cause to the 1834 emancipation of slaves throughout the Empire.

== Bahamian and Jamaican jurisdictions ==
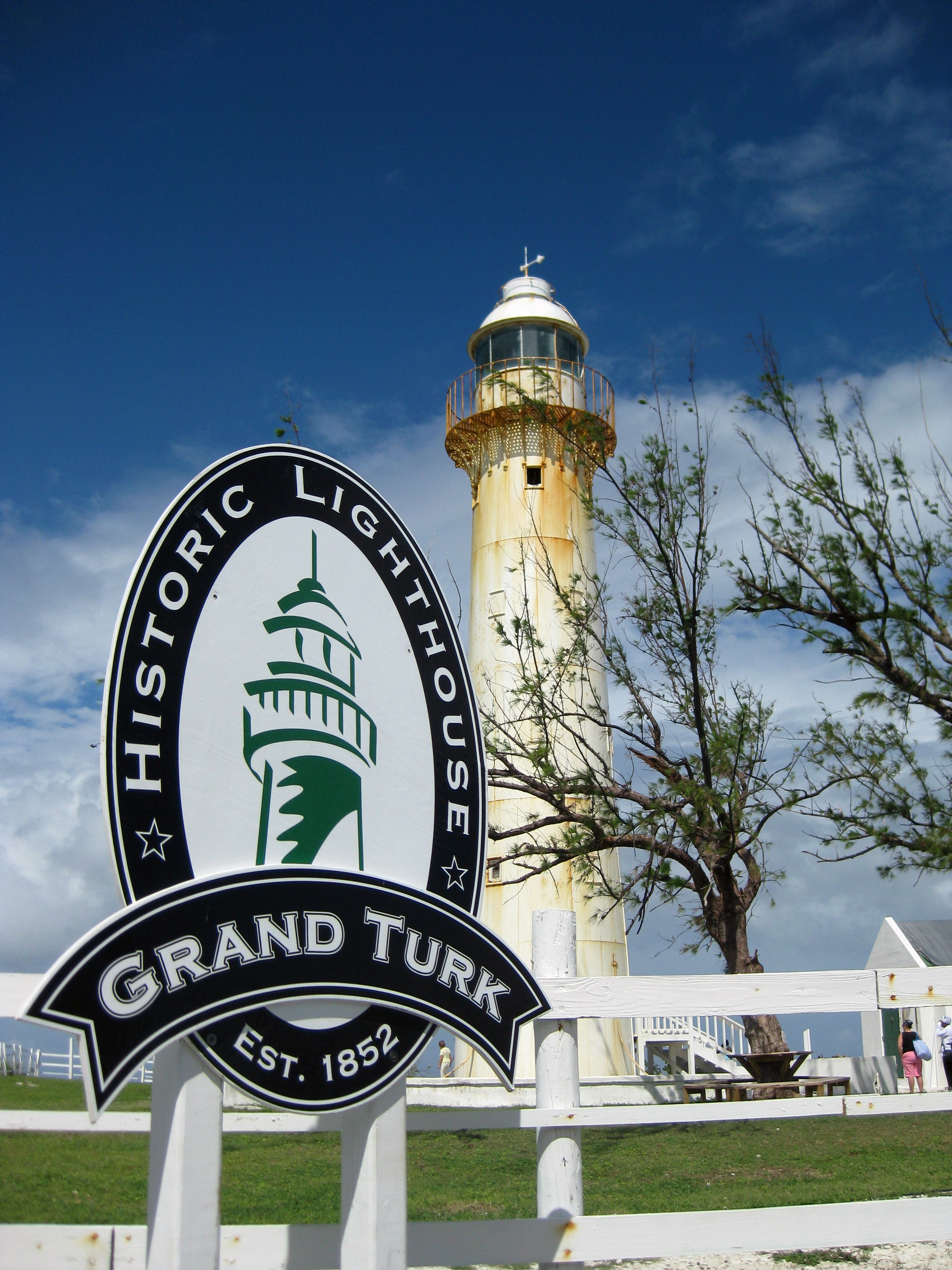
The 1852 lighthouse on Grand Turk

The islands remained part of the Bahamas until 1848, when the inhabitants successfully petitioned to be made a separate colony governed by a council president under the supervision of the governor of Jamaica. This arrangement proved to be a financial burden.

Turks and Caicos Islands Act 1873 (Note: Section 3.)
- Act of Parliament
- Parliament of the United Kingdom
- Long title: An Act to enable Her Majesty by Order in Council to annex the Turks and Caicos Islands to the Colony of Jamaica.
- Citation: 36 & 37 Vict. c. 6
- Territorial extent: United Kingdom

Dates
- Royal assent: 4 April 1873
- Commencement: 4 April 1873 (Note: The Acts of Parliament (Commencement) Act 1793.)
- Repealed: 22 September 1893
Other legislation
Repealed by	Statute Law Revision (No. 2) Act 1893

Status: Repealed

Text of statute as originally enacted

In 1873, the islands were annexed to Jamaica with a commissioner and a Legislative Board; in 1894, the chief colonial official was restyled commissioner. In 1917, Canadian Prime Minister Robert Borden suggested that the Turks and Caicos join Canada, but this suggestion was rejected by British Prime Minister David Lloyd George. The islands remained a dependency of Jamaica.

The islands remained a dependency of Jamaica until 1959, when they received their own administration under an administrator, although the governor of Jamaica remained the governor of the islands. When Jamaica was granted independence from Britain in August 1962, the Turks and Caicos Islands became a crown colony. From 1965 the governor of The Bahamas was also governor of the Turks and Caicos Islands and oversaw affairs for the islands.

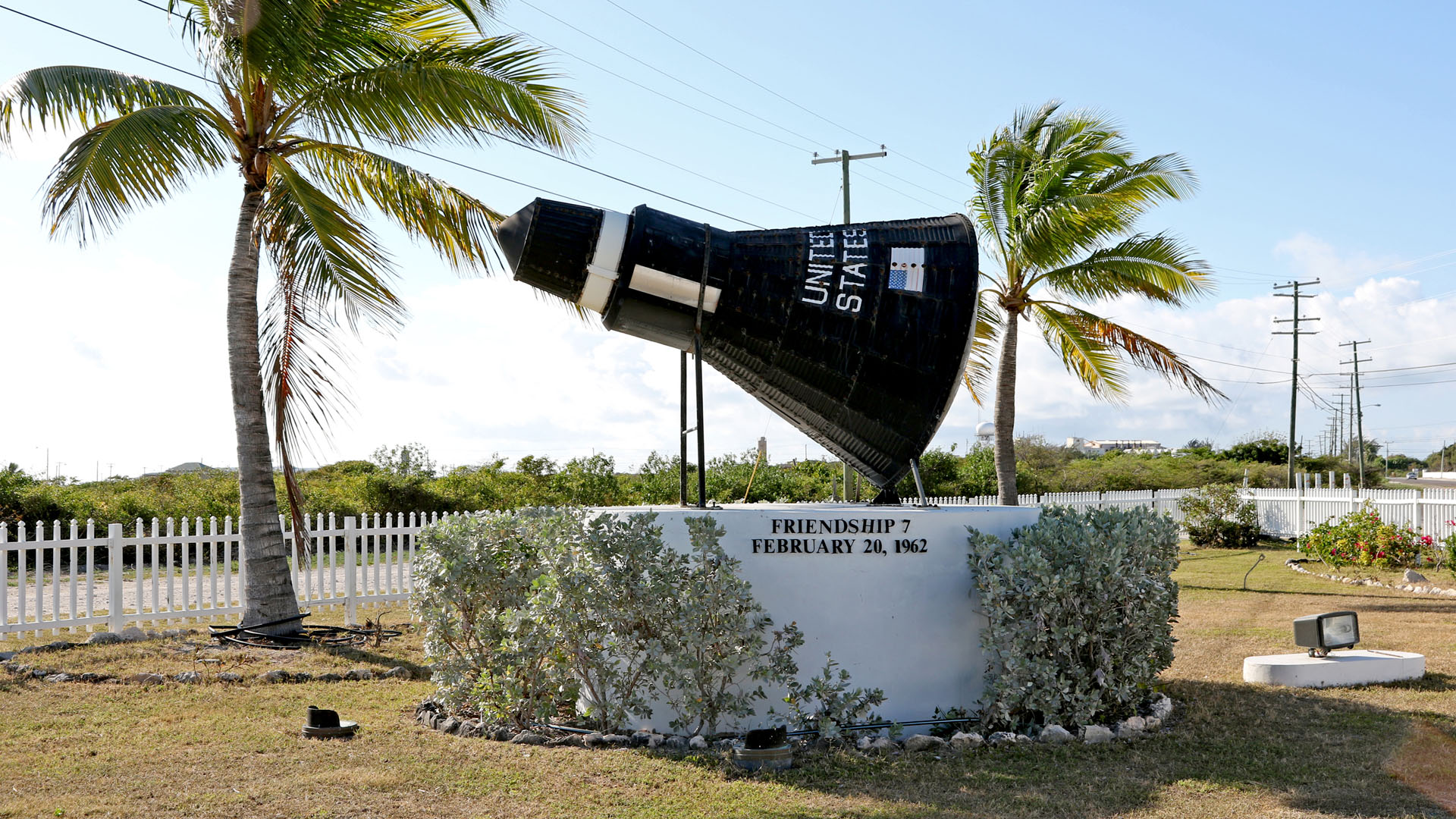
Replica of Friendship 7 at Grand Turk Airport

From 1950 to 1981, the United States had a missile tracking station on Grand Turk. In the early days of the American space program, NASA used it. After his three earth orbits in 1962, American astronaut John Glenn successfully landed in the nearby ocean and was brought back ashore to Grand Turk island.

The salt industry, along with small sponge and hemp exports, sustained the Turks and Caicos Islands (only barely, however; there was little population growth and the economy stagnated) until in the 1960s American investors arrived on the islands and funded the construction of an airstrip on Provo Island and built the archipelago's first hotel, "The Third Turtle". A small trickle of tourists began to arrive, supplementing the salt economy. Club Med set up a resort at Grace Bay soon after. In the 1980s, Club Med funded an upgrading of the airstrip to allow for larger aircraft, and since then, tourism has been gradually on the increase. It is common for foreign couples to be married in the Turks and Caicos Islands today.

== Autonomy ==
When the Bahamas gained independence in 1973, the Turks and Caicos received their own governor (the last administrator was restyled). In 1974, Canadian New Democratic Party MP Max Saltsman tried to use his Private Member's Bill for legislation to annex the islands to Canada, but it did not pass in the House of Commons of Canada.

The islands adopted their first constitution on 30 August 1976, which is Constitution Day, the national holiday. Since then, the islands have had their own government headed by a chief minister (now premier). The winning party of Turks and Caicos' first general election in 1976, the People's Democratic Movement (PDM) under "Jags" McCartney, sought to establish a framework and accompanying infrastructure in the pursuit of an eventual policy of full independence for the islands. However, with the early death of McCartney, confidence in the country's leadership waned.

In 1980, the ruling pro-independence party, the People's Democratic Movement (PDM), agreed with the British government that independence would be granted in 1982 if the PDM was reelected in the elections of that year. That election was effectively a referendum on the independence issue. The PDM lost the elections to the Progressive National Party (PNP), which supported continued British rule. The PNP's leader, Norman Saunders, became chief minister, and won again the 1984 elections. With these developments, the independence issue largely faded from the political scene. However, in 1985 Saunders and two associates were convicted in the USA on drug charges.

The PNP emerged victorious from the following by-elections, but on 24 July 1986, the governor dissolved the government and replaced it with an advisory council after a report on allegations of arson and fraud found that the chief minister post-Saunders, Nathaniel Francis, along with four other PNP officials were unfit to rule.

The constitution was suspended in 1986, but restored and revised 5 March 1988. In the interim two Advisory Councils took over with members from the Progressive National Party (PNP), People's Democratic Movement (PDM) and National Democratic Alliance (NDA), which was a splinter group from the PNP: Under the careful guidance of the governor and the advisory council, a new constitution of the Turks and Caicos Islands was created and elections held in 1988, with the PNP winning by a landslide, and Washington Misick becoming the new chief minister.

Elections in the Turks and Caicos Islands were held on 24 April 2003 and again on 9 February 2007 with the PNP, led by Michael Misick, winning both. The Progressive National Party, led by Michael Misick, held thirteen seats, and the People's Democratic Movement, led by Floyd Seymour, held two seats.

A new constitution came into force on 9 August 2006, but was in parts suspended and amended in 2009. Under the 2006 constitution, the head of government was the premier, filled by the leader of the elected party. The cabinet consisted of three ex officio members and five appointed by the governor from among the members of the House of Assembly. The unicameral House of Assembly consisted of 21 seats, of which 15 were popularly elected; members serve four-year terms.

However, in the mid-2000s, the issue of independence for the islands was again raised. In April 2006, PNP Premier Michael Misick reaffirmed that his party saw independence from Britain as the "ultimate goal" for the islands, but not at the present time. In 2008, opponents of Misick accused him of moving toward independence for the islands to dodge a commission of inquiry, which examined reports of corruption by the Misick Administration.

In 2008, after members of the British parliament conducting a routine review the administration received several reports of high-level official corruption in the Turks and Caicos, Governor Richard Tauwhare announced the appointment of a Commission of Enquiry into corruption. The same year, Premier Misick himself became the focus of the corruption investigation. He resigned under fire in March 2009. As a result, Governor Gordon Wetherell suspended the local government and the British took over direct rule which lasted from August 2009 until the general elections of November 2012 under a new (15 October 2012) constitution.

=== Corruption scandal and suspension of self-government ===
In 2008, after members of the British parliament conducting a routine review of the administration received several reports of high-level official corruption in the Turks and Caicos, then-Governor Richard Tauwhare announced the appointment of a Commission of Enquiry into corruption. The same year, Premier Michael Misick himself became the focus of a criminal investigation after a woman identified by news outlets as an American citizen residing in Puerto Rico accused him of sexually assaulting her, although he strongly denies the charge.

On Monday, 16 March 2009, the UK threatened to suspend self-government in the islands and transfer power to the new governor, Gordon Wetherell, over systemic corruption.

On 18 March 2009, on the advice of her UK ministers, Queen Elizabeth II issued an Order in Council giving the Governor the power to suspend those parts of the 2006 Constitution that deal with ministerial government and the House of Assembly, and to exercise the powers of government himself. The order, which would also establish an Advisory Council and Consultative Forum in place of the House of Assembly, would come into force on a date to be announced by the governor, and remain in force for two years unless extended or revoked.

On 23 March 2009, after the enquiry found evidence of "high probability of systemic corruption or other serious dishonesty", Misick resigned as Premier to make way for a new, unified government. Politicians were accused of selling crown land for personal gain and misusing public funds. The following day, Galmo Williams was sworn in as his replacement. Misick denied all charges, and referred to the British government's debate on whether to remove the territory's sovereignty as "tantamount to being re-colonised. It is a backwards step completely contrary to the whole movement of history."

On 14 August 2009 after Misick's last appeals failed, the Governor, on the instructions of the Foreign and Commonwealth Office, imposed direct rule on the Turks and Caicos Islands by authority of the 18 March 2009 Order in Council issued by the Queen. The islands' administration was suspended for up to two years, with possible extensions, and power was transferred to the Governor, with the United Kingdom also stationing a supply vessel in between Turks and Caicos. Parliamentary Under-Secretary of State for Foreign Affairs Chris Bryant said of the decision to impose rule, "This is a serious constitutional step which the UK Government has not taken lightly but these measures are essential in order to restore good governance and sound financial management."

The move was met with vehement opposition by the former Turks and Caicos government, with Misick's successor Williams calling it a "coup", and stating that, "Our country is being invaded and re-colonised by the United Kingdom, dismantling a duly elected government and legislature and replacing it with a one-man dictatorship, akin to that of the old Red China, all in the name of good governance." Despite this, the civilian populace was reported to be largely welcoming of the enforced rule. The British government stated that they intended to keep true to their word that the country would regain home rule in two years or less, and Foreign Office Minister Chris Bryant said that elections would be held in 2011, "or sooner". Governor Wetherell stated that he would aim to "make a clean break from the mistakes of the past" and create "a durable path towards good governance, sound financial management and sustainable development". Wetherell added: "In the meantime we must all learn to foster a quality of public spirit, listen to all those who have the long-term interests of these islands at heart, and safeguard the fundamental assets of the Territory for future generations ... Our guiding principles will be those of transparency, accountability and responsibility. I believe that most people in the Turks and Caicos will welcome these changes."

=== Restoration of autonomy ===
On 12 June 2012 British Foreign Secretary William Hague announced that fresh elections would be held in November 2012, stating that there had been "significant progress with an ambitious reform programme" and that there had been "sufficient progress, on the milestones and on putting in place robust financial controls" A new constitution was approved on 15 October 2012. The terms of the election are specified in the constitution. Under the new Constitution, legislative power is held by a unicameral House of Assembly, consisting of 19 seats, 15 elected and 4 appointed by the governor; of elected members, five are elected at large and 10 from single member districts for four-year terms.

After the 2012 elections, Rufus Ewing of the Progressive National Party won a narrow majority of seats and was appointed premier. Sharlene Cartwright-Robinson of the People's Democratic Movement (PDM) becoming the leader of the opposition.

In the 2016 elections the People's Democratic Movement prevailed and Sharlene Cartwright-Robinson became Premier.

== See also ==
- History of Bermuda
- History of the Bahamas
- History of the Caribbean
- History of Jamaica
- History of the Americas

== Bibliography ==
- This article incorporates text from Sheppard Software's Snapshot of the Caribbean: Turks and Caicos webpage.
