= Akierra Missick =

Turks and Caicos Islands lawyer and politician (born 1983)

The Honourable Akierra Missick MHA
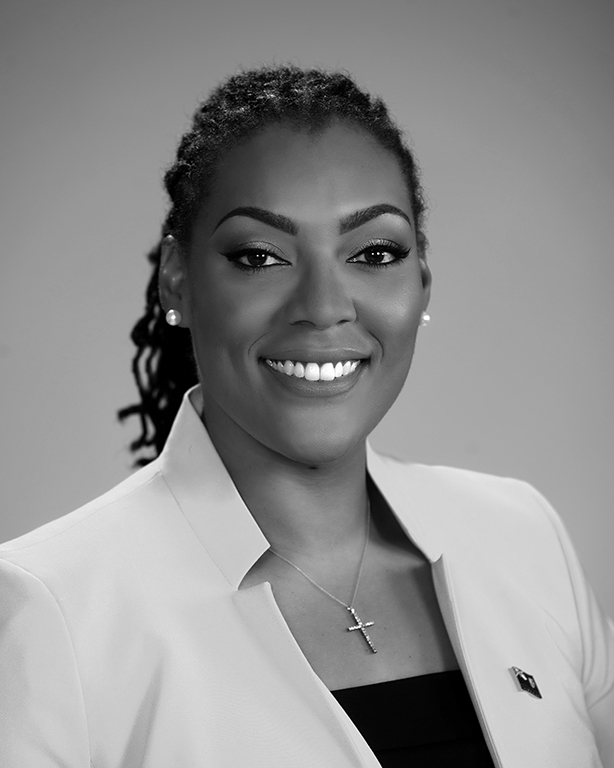

Deputy Premier of the Turks and Caicos Islands
- In office 13 November 2012 – 20 December 2016
- Governor: Ric Todd; Peter Beckingham; John Freeman
- Preceded by: office suspended
- Succeeded by: Sean Rickard Astwood

Minister of Infrastructure, Housing Planning and Development
- In office 22 February 2022 – 8 November 2022
- Premier: Washington Misick
- Preceded by: Sean Astwood

Leader of Government Business
- In office 22 February 2021 – 8 November 2022
- Premier: Washington Misick

MHA for Leeward & Long Bay
- Incumbent
- Assumed office 12 November 2012
- Preceded by: Galmo Williams

Personal details
- Born: May 11, 1983 (age 43) U.S.
- Party: Progressive National Party
- Education: University of Nottingham (LL.B); Inns of Court School of Law
- Nickname: AK

Akierra Mary Deanne Missick (born 1983) is a Turks and Caicos Islands lawyer and politician. She served as Deputy Premier and Minister of Education from 2012 to 2016 and Leader of Government Business and Minister of Infrastructure from 2021 to 2022. A member of the Progressive National Party, Missick has served as the Member of the House of Assembly (MHA) for Leeward & Long Bay ED5 since 2012.

== Early life and education ==
Missick was born in the United States, and had jus soli citizenship there. She attended Ona Glinton Primary School on Grand Turk Island, Iris Stubbs Primary School on South Caicos, and MAST Academy in Miami, Florida in the United States. Following that she moved to England to continue her schooling, doing her A-Levels at Notre Dame Catholic Sixth Form College, her LL.B at the University of Nottingham from 2002 to 2005, and her Bar Vocational Course at the Inns of Court School of Law in London.

== Career ==
=== Law ===
Missick was called to the bar of England and Wales and the bar of the Turks and Caicos Islands. She works as a senior associate in the areas of litigation and dispute resolution for the law firm of Misick & Stanbrook.

=== Political ===
Missick became a member of the Progressive National Party in 2002. She was formerly Secretary-General of the PNP. She resigned from that position in August 2009 to protest statements made by Michael Misick but continued her membership in the party.

In August 2012, Missick announced that she would be seeking the PNP's nomination to stand in Leeward District 5, Providenciales for the 2012 general election. Due to provisions in the new 2011 Constitution of the Turks and Caicos Islands, this required her to renounce any foreign allegiance she held by virtue of her act. As Attorney-General Huw Shepheard commented, those who were merely born in foreign countries would not be affected by these changes, but those who had applied for foreign passports as adults would be. Missick, though the only U.S.-born candidate, was far from the only one to have to take quick action to renounce foreign citizenship; Bahamas-born People's Democratic Movement deputy leader Sharlene Cartwright-Robinson and several other members of her party were also affected, and the newly formed People's Progressive Party stood in danger of having all of its candidates disqualified. Missick renounced U.S. citizenship in mid-October, and was officially nominated on 25 October. She emerged victorious in the election, and the week afterward was named as Deputy Premier and Minister of Education, Youth, Sports and Culture.

Missick was re-elected as the Member of the House of Assembly for Leeward-Long Bay ED5 in the 2016 general election and the 2021 general election. She was appointed by Premier Charles Misick to serve as the Leader of Government Business and Minister of Infrastructure, Housing Planning and Development on 22 January 2021.

== Personal life ==
Missick's mother is Doreen Missick, also a Turks and Caicos Islands politician, and a former member of the Advisory Council.
