= 1999 Turks and Caicos Islands general election =

1999 Turks and Caicos Islands General Election
← 1995	March 4, 1999	2003 →

13 seats in the Legislative Council 7 seats needed for a majority
- Registered: 5,424
- Turnout: 4,602 (84.8%)
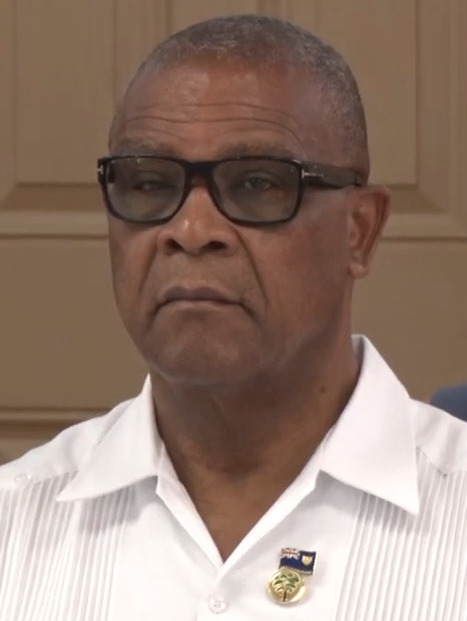
	First party	Second party
Leader	Derek Taylor	Washington Misick
Party	People's Democratic Movement	Progressive National Party
Leader's seat	Grand Turk South Back Salina	Grand Turk Over Back
Seats won	9	4
Seat change	▲1	No change
Popular vote	2,389	1,849
Percentage	51.9%	40.2%
Chief Minister before election
Derek Taylor
People's Democratic Movement
Chief Minister after Election
Derek Taylor
People's Democratic Movement

General elections were held in the Turks and Caicos Islands on 4 March 1999. The result was a victory for the ruling People's Democratic Movement (PDM), which won nine of the thirteen seats in the Legislative Council. PDM leader Derek Hugh Taylor remained Chief Minister.

== Electoral system ==
The thirteen members of the Legislative Council were elected from single-member constituencies.

== Campaign ==
A total of 38 candidates contested the elections; the Progressive National Party (PNP) and PDM both ran full slates of 13 candidates, with an additional twelve candidates running as independents.

== Results ==
Party	Votes	%	Seats	+/–
People's Democratic Movement	2,362	52.22	9	+1
Progressive National Party	1,849	40.88	4	0
Independents	312	6.90	0	–1
Total	4,523	100.00	13	0
Valid votes	4,523	98.09		
Invalid/blank votes	88	1.91		
Total votes	4,611	100.00		
Registered voters/turnout	5,424	85.01		
Source: Caribbean Elections
