= Porsha Stubbs-Smith =

British politician

Minister of Tourism, Environment, Heritage and Culture
- Monarch: Elizabeth II
- Premier: Sharlene Cartwright-Robinson
- Governor: John Freeman

Minister of Health and Human Services
- Monarch: Elizabeth II
- Premier: Sharlene Cartwright-Robinson
- Governor: John Freeman

Minister for Environment and Home Affairs
- In office 14 November 2012 – 14 November 2015
- Monarch: Elizabeth II
- Premier: Sharlene Cartwright-Robinson
- Governor: John Freeman
- Constituency: The Bight

Member of the House of Assembly of the Turks and Caicos Islands
- In office 2012–2016
- Constituency: The Bight
- Majority: 1 (2017)

Personal details
- Born: Porsha Monique Stubbs Smith
- Party: Progressive National Party

Porsha Stubbs-Smith is a Turks and Caicos Islander politician, who served as the Minister of Tourism, Environment, Heritage and Culture.

== Career ==
Stubbs-Smith was elected to the Turks and Caicos Islands House of Assembly at the 2012 general election in The Bight constituency for the Progressive National Party. Initially, she was Minister for Environment and Home Affairs, before becoming Minister of Health and Human Services. As Minister of Tourism, Environment, Heritage and Culture, she led a delegation to the United Kingdom in 2016.

She stood once again at the 2016 general election. Stubbs-Smith was re-elected, but the result was challenged by George Pratt of the People's Democratic Movement as she was elected after several recounts resulted in a draw. The decision came down to placing the names of both Stubbs-Smith and Pratt in a box and drawing the victor, with Stubbs-Smith therefore being counted as the victor by a single vote. Pratt's challenge was on the basis of a single Turks and Caicos Islander being unable to vote as they found their name was not on the electoral roll when she attended the Polling Station. Chief Justice Margaret Ramsay-Hale dismissed the challenge and upheld the decision.
