= 2025 Turks and Caicos Islands general election =

- 7 February 2025

19 of the 21 seats in the Parliament 10 seats needed for a majority
- Registered: 9,385
- Turnout: 73.91%
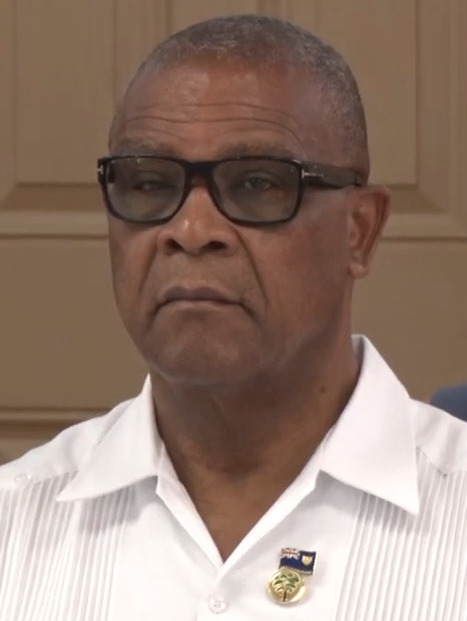
	First party	Second party
		PDM
Leader	Washington Misick	Edwin Astwood
Party	PNP	PDM
Last election	14 seats	1 seat
Seats won	16	2
Seat change	▲2	▲1
- Results by constituency
Premier before election
Washington Misick
PNP
Elected Premier
Washington Misick
PNP

General elections were held in the Turks and Caicos Islands on 7 February 2025 to determine the composition of the Parliament of the Turks and Caicos Islands. Significant constitutional changes meant they were the first general election in which nine at-large MPs were elected.

== Background ==
The House of Assembly was renamed the Parliament of the Turks and Caicos Islands on 10 December 2024, alongside a term increase to a maximum of five years. The electoral system was also modified so that 19 instead of 15 members will be elected, with the four formerly appointed seats becoming at-large constituency seats. The constitutional amendments were unanimously adopted by the House of Assembly and afterwards authorised by the government of the United Kingdom in late 2024.

In practice this meant that voters now have to fill out just one paper ballot instead of two, and will fill in ovals next to candidates names instead of marking a box with an X. Votes will be counted electronically. Despite the new simplifications, there is still a concern that some voters will be either unaware or confused by the changes, so both written and video recorded English instructions will also be provided to polling locations on how to vote under the new system.

== Electoral system ==
The Parliament has 21 members, of whom 19 are elected members and two (the Attorney General and Speaker) are ex officio.

The 19 members were elected by two methods; ten from single-member constituencies and nine elected on an at-large basis, with voters able to vote for up to nine candidates at the national level.

== Campaign ==
The composition of the outgoing assembly, with the ruling PNP holding 12 seats, and the opposition PDM holding just 1

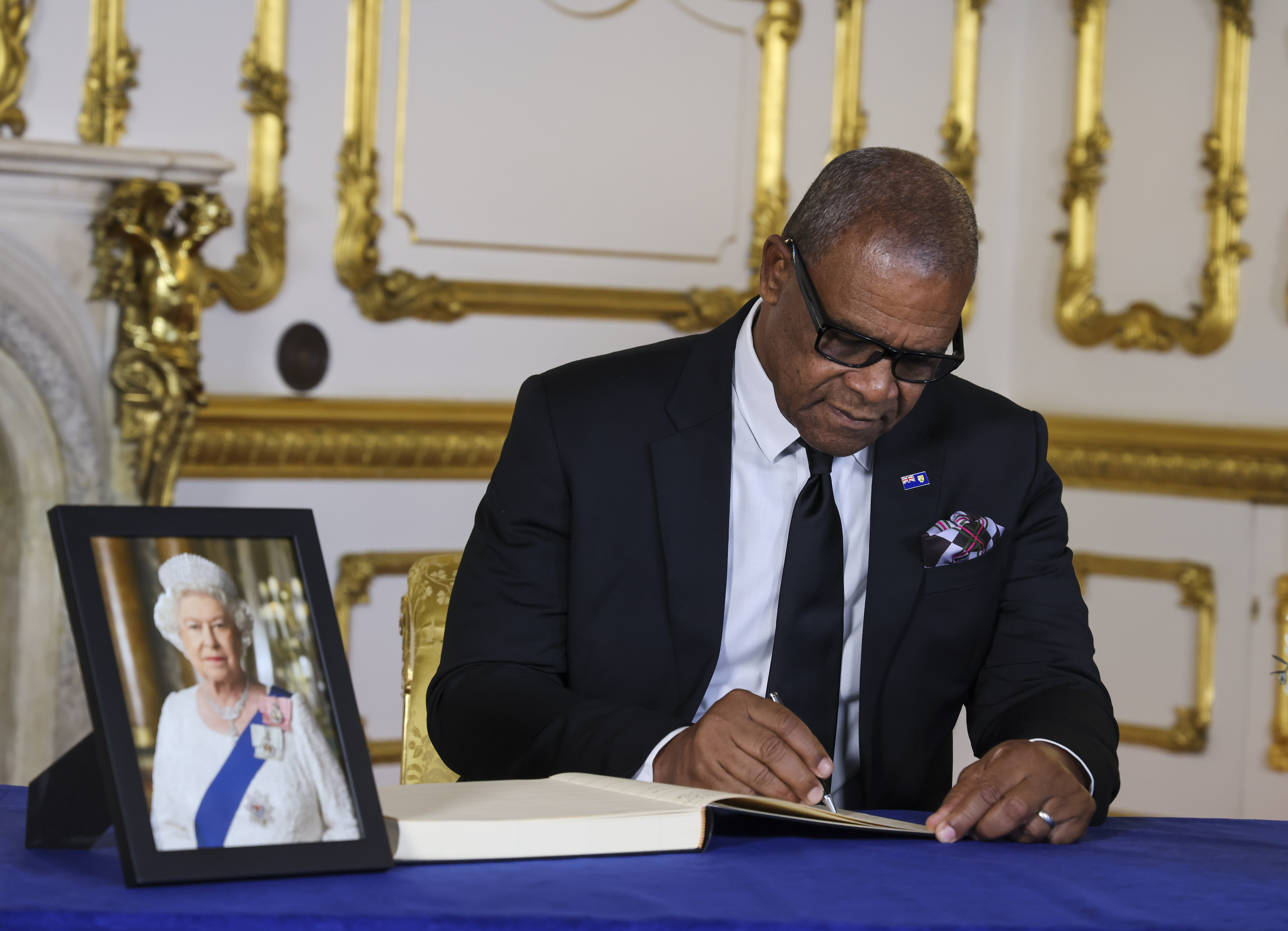
Incumbent PNP premier Washington Misick signing the guestbook at the Funeral of Elizabeth II

The Turks and Caicos has a de facto two party system between the centre-right People's Democratic Movement (PDM) and the centre-left Progressive National Party (PNP). The PNP has been governing with Washington Misick as premier since the 2021 elections saw the PDM collapse from 10 seats to just one due to unpopular mismanagement of both the economy and the reaction to the COVID-19 pandemic, which the PNP is still campaigning on. The PNP's manifesto called the PDM's time in office from 2016 to 2021 as "factless and incompetent" and touted over $4 billion in foreign investments under their leadership, as well as a 20% increase in the minimum wage and the first-ever pay review for public servants, alongside a debt forgiveness scheme the government implemented. The PDM's manifesto centered around calling the PNP soft on crime and pledged to strengthen the island’s security framework while also calling to "secure our borders." The manifesto also called for the mass construction of new homes, and the reduction in the cost of living and increasing domestic education and employment opportunities. The PDM also called for an increase to a $1,000 stipend to the elderly, and the expansion of mental health facilities.

One of the leading controversies of the election was the leader of the PDM calling the murder of an immigrant insurance broker and her brother, an American sheriff's deputy from Chicago, outside a nightclub on 27 January, as "a message from God", leading to a reprimand from the Governor "to be mindful."

== Results ==
The PNP government was re-elected, winning 16 of the 19 available seats while the PDM opposition won just 2. Independent candidate Tamell Seymour was victorious in the South Caicos seat.

Party	District			At-large			Total seats	+/–
Party	Votes	%	Seats	Votes	%	Seats	Total seats	+/–
Progressive National Party	3,958	58.56	7	35,560	60.17	9	16	+2
People's Democratic Movement	2,578	38.14	2	22,794	38.57	0	2	+1
Progressive Democratic Alliance				183	0.31	0	0	0
Independents	223	3.30	1	558	0.94	0	1	+1
Ex officio members							2	0
Total	6,759	100.00	10	59,095	100.00	9	21	0
Valid votes	6,759	100.00		6,936	100.00			
Invalid/blank votes	0	0.00		0	0.00			
Total votes	6,759	100.00		6,936	100.00			
Registered voters/turnout	9,385	72.02		9,385	73.91			
Source: Turks & Caicos Islands Government Caffe

=== By constituency ===
Constituency		Candidate	Party	Votes
1	Grand Turk North	Otis Chuck Morris	Progressive National Party	377
1	Grand Turk North	George Lightbourne	People's Democratic Movement	198
2	Grand Turk South and Salt Cay	Edwin Astwood	People's Democratic Movement	363
2	Grand Turk South and Salt Cay	Walter Federick Lake Gardiner	Progressive National Party	315
2	Grand Turk South and Salt Cay	Derek Been	Independent	58
3	South Caicos	Tamell Seymour	Independent	165
3	South Caicos	John Jamael Malcolm	Progressive National Party	104
3	South Caicos	Hynetta Lenore Forbes	People's Democratic Movement	28
4	Middle and North Caicos	Arlington Alexander Musgrove	Progressive National Party	371
4	Middle and North Caicos	Denaz Williams	People's Democratic Movement	144
5	Leeward (Providenciales)	Akierra Missick	Progressive National Party	461
5	Leeward (Providenciales)	Keith Cox	People's Democratic Movement	213
6	The Bight (Providenciales)	Audric Skippings	People's Democratic Movement	359
6	The Bight (Providenciales)	Matthew Timothy Stubbs	Progressive National Party	358
7	Cheshire Hall and Richmond Hill (Providenciales)	Samuel Ernest Been	Progressive National Party	553
7	Cheshire Hall and Richmond Hill (Providenciales)	Finbar Albert Grant	People's Democratic Movement	354
8	Blue Hills (Providenciales)	Randy Dexter Howell	Progressive National Party	368
8	Blue Hills (Providenciales)	Anthony McCleaver Walkin	People's Democratic Movement	365
9	Five Cays (Providenciales)	Rachel Marshall Taylor	Progressive National Party	657
9	Five Cays (Providenciales)	Bryant R. Cox	People's Democratic Movement	299
10	Wheeland (Providenciales)	Kyle Knowles	Progressive National Party	394
10	Wheeland (Providenciales)	Vaden Delroy Williams	People's Democratic Movement	255
All Island District; 9 elected at-large
All Island District; 9 elected at-large		Erwin Jay Saunders	Progressive National Party	4,614
All Island District; 9 elected at-large		Washington Misick	Progressive National Party	4,208
All Island District; 9 elected at-large		Jamell Robinson	Progressive National Party	4,050
All Island District; 9 elected at-large		Shaun David Malcolm	Progressive National Party	3,992
All Island District; 9 elected at-large		Zhavargo Jermaine Jolly	Progressive National Party	3,932
All Island District; 9 elected at-large		Jameka Lashawn Williams	Progressive National Party	3,911
All Island District; 9 elected at-large		Josephine Connolly	Progressive National Party	3,881
All Island District; 9 elected at-large		Sharon Anne Simons	Progressive National Party	3,574
All Island District; 9 elected at-large		Willin Antoni Belliard	Progressive National Party	3,398
All Island District; 9 elected at-large		Robert A. Been	People's Democratic Movement	2,767
All Island District; 9 elected at-large		Karen Malcolm	People's Democratic Movement	2,709
All Island District; 9 elected at-large		Sabrina Green	People's Democratic Movement	2,591
All Island District; 9 elected at-large		Sean Richard Astwood	People's Democratic Movement	2,562
All Island District; 9 elected at-large		Temmard Butterfield	People's Democratic Movement	2,498
All Island District; 9 elected at-large		Ralph Lewis Higgs	People's Democratic Movement	2,490
All Island District; 9 elected at-large		Dwayne Taylor	People's Democratic Movement	2,486
All Island District; 9 elected at-large		Ruth Mae Ariza	People's Democratic Movement	2,440
All Island District; 9 elected at-large		Alvin Kingsley Garland	People's Democratic Movement	2,251
All Island District; 9 elected at-large		Philip McRae Robinson	Independent	286
All Island District; 9 elected at-large		Paul Bernard Beresford	Independent	272
All Island District; 9 elected at-large		Winston McLaughlin	Progressive Democratic Alliance	183
