= Karen Malcolm =

Turks and Caicos Islander politician (born 1963)

Karen Malcolm (born 1963) is a politician in the Turks and Caicos Islands. From 2016 to 2021, she was a member of the House of Assembly and the islands' minister of education, youth, culture, social, and library services.

== Biography ==
Malcolm was born in 1963 in Back Salina, Grand Turk Island. She was raised there and then in the Bahamas, where she was sent to live after her mother died when she was eight years old.

She became the first employee from Turks and Caicos of the Bank of Nova Scotia Bahamas, where she worked first in the Bahamas and then back in Turks and Caicos beginning in 1982. In addition to her work as a banker, Malcolm has been involved in several NGOs and nonprofits, including Soroptimist International and the Child Evangelism Fellowship.

Malcolm ran as a member of the People's Democratic Movement in the December 2016 election, winning an at-large seat in the House of Assembly.

She was elected deputy speaker of the House of Assembly shortly thereafter.

In June 2017, she was appointed minister of education, youth, culture, social, and library services, replacing Josephine Connolly, after Connolly was fired from the cabinet over "claims of insolence and falsehood." Malcolm also continued in her role as deputy speaker.

As part of her role as education minister, she oversaw the response of the country's education system to the COVID-19 pandemic.

In the 2021 Turks and Caicos Islands general election, Malcolm lost her at-large seat in the House of Assembly as the rival Progressive National Party swept into power. She ran again in 2025, but fell short as the PNP retained its hold.
