= 1995 Turks and Caicos Islands general election =

1995 Turks and Caicos Islands General Election
- February 2, 1995

13 seats in the Legislative Council 7 seats needed for a majority
- Registered: Needed
- Turnout: 4,171
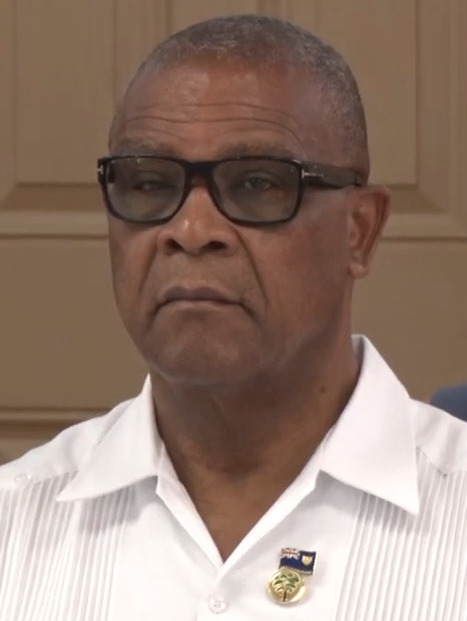
	First party	Second party
Leader	Derek Taylor	Washington Misick
Party	People's Democratic Movement	Progressive National Party
Leader's seat	Grand Turk South Back Salina	Grand Turk Over Back
Seats won	8	4
Seat change	▲3	▼4
Popular vote	2,007	1,938
Percentage	48.1%	46.5%
Chief Minister before election
Washington Misick
Progressive National Party
Chief Minister after Election
Derek Taylor
People's Democratic Movement

General elections were held in the Turks and Caicos Islands on 2 February 1995. The result was a victory for the opposition People's Democratic Movement (PDM), which won eight of the thirteen seats in the Legislative Council. Following the elections, PDM leader Derek Hugh Taylor became Chief Minister.

== Electoral system ==
The thirteen members of the Legislative Council were elected from single-member constituencies, a change from the system used between 1988 and 1991 when they were elected from five multi-member constituencies.

== Campaign ==
A total of 33 candidates contested the elections; the Progressive National Party (PNP) and PDM both ran full slates of 13 candidates, with an additional seven candidates running as independents.

== Results ==
Party	Votes	%	Seats	+/–
People's Democratic Movement	2,058	49.99	8	+3
Progressive National Party	1,887	45.83	4	–4
Independents	172	4.18	1	New
Total	4,117	100.00	13	0
Valid votes	4,117	98.09		
Invalid/blank votes	80	1.91		
Total votes	4,197	100.00		
Registered voters/turnout	5,431	77.28		
Source: Caribbean Elections
