= Premier of the Turks and Caicos Islands =

Political leader in the Turks and Caicos Islands

- Coat of Arms of the Turks and Caicos Islands

- Flag of the Turks and Caicos Islands

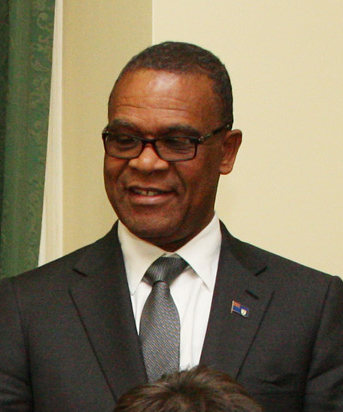
- Incumbent; Washington Misick since 20 February 2021
- Government of the Turks and Caicos Islands; Cabinet of the Turks and Caicos Islands
- Style: The Honourable
- Member of: Cabinet; Parliament
- Nominator: Political parties
- Appointer: Governor of the Turks and Caicos Islands
- Term length: At the governor's pleasure
- Formation: 31 August 1976; 50 years ago
- First holder: James Alexander George Smith McCartney as Chief Minister
- Deputy: Jamell Robinson

The Premier of the Turks and Caicos Islands is the political leader and head of government. The post of premier is the equivalent to chief minister or prime minister in other British Overseas Territories. It is the highest political level that can be attained within the British colonial system. Prior to 2006, the position was known as the Chief Minister of the Turks and Caicos Islands.

The premier and Cabinet (consisting of all the most senior ministers) are collectively accountable for their policies and actions to King Charles III, to the Parliament, to their political party and ultimately to the electorate.

The current premier is Charles Washington Misick, since 20 February 2021.

== Constitutional background ==
The office of Chief Minister of the Turks and Caicos Islands was created in 1976 when ministerial governance was introduced under a new constitution entered into force, stating that it was to be appointed by the Governor of the Turks and Caicos Islands. In the 1976 Turks and Caicos Islands general election, J. A. G. S. McCartney was elected as the first Chief Minister. In 1985, due to the Chief Minister being implicated in drugs crimes and corrupt practices, the Governor dismissed the Chief Minister and suspended the constitution and brought in direct rule from the United Kingdom. In 1988, a new constitution was brought in to increase the number of elected members in time for the 1988 Turks and Caicos Islands general election.

A new constitution, after being laid in the Turks and Caicos Legislative Council and receiving Queen Elizabeth II's signature, entered into force on 9 August 2006. The new constitution of the Turks and Caicos Islands changed the title of Chief Minister and Deputy Chief Minister to Premier and Deputy Premier.

On 14 August 2009, the United Kingdom suspended the Turks and Caicos' self-government after allegations of ministerial corruption under the Premier. The prerogative of the ministerial government and the House of Assembly were vested in the islands' incumbent Governor for a period of up to two years, which was extended until 2012.

== List ==
The following is the list of Chief Ministers and Premiers of the Turks and Caicos Islands: (Dates in italics indicate de facto continuation of office)

PDM PNP
No.	Portrait	Name (Birth–Death)	Term of office			Political party	Elected	Notes
No.	Portrait	Name (Birth–Death)	Took office	Left office	Time in office	Political party	Elected	Notes
Chief Ministers (1976–2006)
1		James Alexander George Smith McCartney (1945–1980)	31 August 1976	9 May 1980	3 years, 191 days	People's Democratic Movement	1976	Died in office
2		Oswald Skippings (born 1953)	19 June 1980	4 November 1980	138 days	People's Democratic Movement	—	First tenure
3		Norman Saunders (born 1943)	4 November 1980	28 March 1985	4 years, 144 days	Progressive National Party	1980; 1984	
4		Nathaniel Francis (1912–2004)	28 March 1985	25 July 1986	1 year, 119 days	Progressive National Party	—	
Office suspended (25 July 1986 – 3 March 1988)
(2)		Oswald Skippings (born 1953)	3 March 1988	3 April 1991	3 years, 31 days	People's Democratic Movement	1988	Second tenure
5		Washington Misick (born 1950)	3 April 1991	31 January 1995	3 years, 303 days	Progressive National Party	1991	First tenure
6		Derek Hugh Taylor (born 1951)	31 January 1995	15 August 2003	8 years, 196 days	People's Democratic Movement	1995; 1999	
7		Michael Misick (born 1966)	15 August 2003	9 August 2006	2 years, 359 days	Progressive National Party	2003	Brother of Washington Misick
Premiers (2006–present)
1		Michael Misick (born 1966)	9 August 2006	23 March 2009	2 years, 226 days	Progressive National Party	2007	
2		Galmo Williams (born 1966)	23 March 2009	14 August 2009	144 days	Progressive National Party	—	
Office suspended (14 August 2009 – 13 November 2012)
3		Rufus Ewing (born 1968)	13 November 2012	20 December 2016	4 years, 37 days	Progressive National Party	2012	
4		Sharlene Cartwright-Robinson (born 1971)	20 December 2016	20 February 2021	4 years, 62 days	People's Democratic Movement	2016	
5		Washington Misick (born 1950)	20 February 2021	Incumbent	5 years, 237 days	Progressive National Party	2021; 2025	Second tenure

== See also ==
- List of current heads of government in the United Kingdom and dependencies
- Politics of the Turks and Caicos Islands
- Governor of the Turks and Caicos Islands
