= Carlos Simons =

Turks and Caicos Islands lawyer and politician

Carlos W. Simons QC (born 8 October 1954) is a Turks and Caicos Islands lawyer and politician.

== Career ==
SImons served on a four-member interim Advisory Council He from July 1986 to 3 March 1988 after two previous Chief Ministers were forced to resign and ministerial government in the territory was suspended. Ministerial government resumed after elections were held in early 1988.

He was a member of the National Democratic Alliance during the suspension of government in the 1980s and is now the deputy leader of the Progressive National Party. He is standing as an at-large representative (i.e. for the All-Island District) in the 2012 general election.

== Education ==
Simons attended City University London for his LL.B., and went on to the Inns of Court School of Law. He was called to the bar of England and Wales in 1983, and the following year was admitted to practice as an attorney at law at the Supreme Court of the Turks and Caicos Islands.
