= 1980 Turks and Caicos Islands general election =

1980 Turks and Caicos Islands General Election
- November 4, 1980

11 seats in the Legislative Council 6 seats needed for a majority
- Registered: 3,420
- Turnout: 2,914 (85.2%)
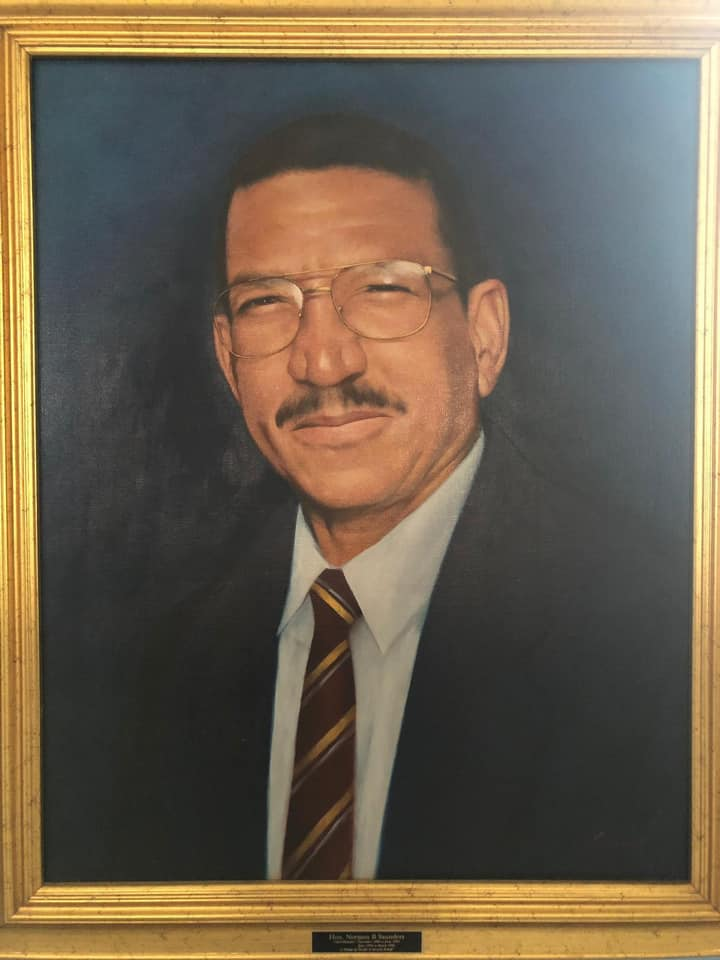

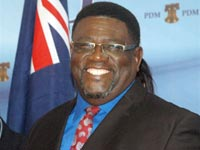
	First party	Second party
Leader	Norman B. Saunders Sr.	Oswald Skippings
Party	Progressive National Party	People's Democratic Movement
Leader's seat	South Caicos North	Grand Turk North Back Salina
Seats won	8	3
Seat change	▲4	▼2
Popular vote	1,724	1,134
Percentage	59.2%	38.9%
Chief Minister before election
Oswald Skippings
People's Democratic Movement
Chief Minister after Election
Norman B. Saunders Sr.
Progressive National Party

General elections were held in the Turks and Caicos Islands on 4 November 1980. The result was a victory for the opposition Progressive National Party (PNP), which won eight of the eleven seats in the Legislative Council. Following the elections, PNP leader Norman Saunders became Chief Minister.

== Electoral system ==
The eleven members of the Legislative Council were elected from single-member constituencies.

== Campaign ==
A total of 24 candidates contested the elections, with the PNP and People's Democratic Movement (PDM) running in all eleven constituencies. The other two candidates were independents.

== Results ==
Party	Votes	%	Seats	+/–
Progressive National Party	1,724	59.51	8	+4
People's Democratic Movement	1,134	39.14	3	–2
Independents	39	1.35	0	–2
Total	2,897	100.00	11	0
Valid votes	2,897	99.42		
Invalid/blank votes	17	0.58		
Total votes	2,914	100.00		
Registered voters/turnout	3,420	85.20		
Source: Caribbean Elections
