= Elections in the Turks and Caicos Islands =

Elections in the Turks and Caicos Islands are carried out at least once every five years to determine the makeup of the Parliament (called the Legislative Assembly prior to the 2024 constitutional reform). The elections in the British Overseas Territory are contested in ten single-member constituencies alongside nine at-large seats.

As of 2026, the Turks and Caicos Islands has a two-party system consisting of the Progressive National Party and the People's Democratic Movement, with the former currently holding power.

== Electoral system ==
Elections are governed by the Turks and Caicos Islands Constitution and various ordinances. The elections use a first-past-the-post system, with ten single-member electoral districts and nine at-large seats are contested. The Parliament has, in addition to its nineteen directly elected members, two ex officio members: the Attorney General, who is appointed by the Governor, and the Speaker, who is appointed by the Parliament with approval from the Premier.

== Electoral districts ==
Map of the electoral districts

Out of the ten single-member electoral districts, two are in the Turk Islands and eight are in the Caicos Islands. The Turk Islands are split into one electoral district for Salt Cay and the southern part of Grand Turk and one for the northern part of Grand Turk, while the Caicos Islands are split into one electoral district for South Caicos, which also includes the islands of East Caicos, Big Ambergris Cay and Little Ambergris Cay, one for Middle Caicos and North Caicos, which also includes Parrot Cay and other nearby islands, and six for Providenciales, of which the Leeward district includes the islands between Parrot Cay and Providenciales and the Wheeland district includes West Caicos. An eleventh electoral district covering the whole territory is used for the nine at-large seats. The single-member electoral districts vary in size from South Caicos with 383 voters to the Cheshire Hall and Richmond Hill district of Providenciales with 1512 voters.

== Latest elections ==
Party	District			At-large			Total seats	+/–
Party	Votes	%	Seats	Votes	%	Seats	Total seats	+/–
Progressive National Party	3,958	58.56	7	35,560	60.17	9	16	+2
People's Democratic Movement	2,578	38.14	2	22,794	38.57	0	2	+1
Progressive Democratic Alliance				183	0.31	0	0	0
Independents	223	3.30	1	558	0.94	0	1	+1
Ex officio members							2	0
Total	6,759	100.00	10	59,095	100.00	9	21	0
Valid votes	6,759	100.00		6,936	100.00			
Invalid/blank votes	0	0.00		0	0.00			
Total votes	6,759	100.00		6,936	100.00			
Registered voters/turnout	9,385	72.02		9,385	73.91			
Source: Turks & Caicos Islands Government Caffe

== See also ==
- Electoral calendar
- Electoral system
