= 1991 Turks and Caicos Islands general election =

1991 Turks and Caicos Islands General Election
- April 3, 1991

13 seats in the Legislative Council 7 seats needed for a majority
- Registered: Needed
- Turnout: Needed
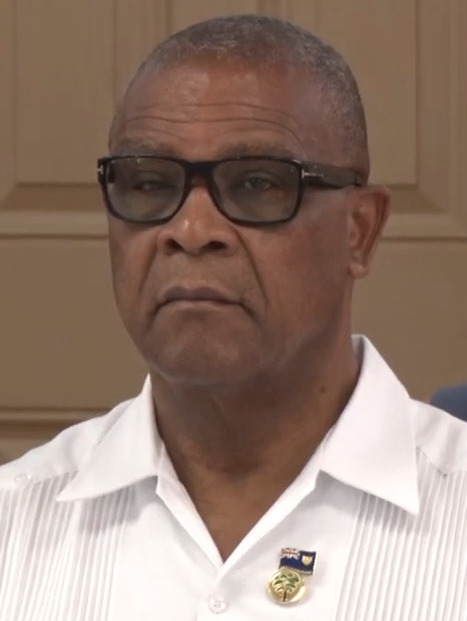

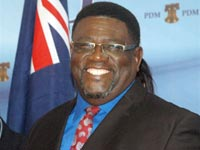
	First party	Second party
Leader	Washington Misick	Oswald Skippings
Party	Progressive National Party	People's Democratic Movement
Leader's seat	Grand Turk North	Grand Turk South & Salt Cay
Seats won	8	5
Seat change	▲6	▼6
Popular vote	Needed	Needed
Percentage	Needed	Needed
Chief Minister before election
Oswald Skippings
People's Democratic Movement
Chief Minister after Election
Washington Misick
Progressive National Party

General elections were held in the Turks and Caicos Islands on 3 April 1991. The result was a victory for the opposition Progressive National Party (PNP), which won eight of the thirteen seats in the Legislative Council. Following the elections, PNP leader Washington Misick became Chief Minister.

== Electoral system ==
The thirteen members of the Legislative Council were elected from five multi-member constituencies with two or three seats.

== Campaign ==
A total of 26 candidates contested the elections, with the PNP and People's Democratic Movement all running full slates of 13 candidates.

== Results ==
Party	Votes	%	Seats	+/–
Progressive National Party	4,834	51.56	8	+6
People's Democratic Movement	4,542	48.44	5	–6
Total	9,376	100.00	13	0
Valid votes	3,596	98.57		
Invalid/blank votes	52	1.43		
Total votes	3,648	100.00		
Registered voters/turnout	4,542	80.32		
Source: Caribbean Elections
