= Erwin Jay Saunders =

The Honourable Erwin Jay Saunders MHA

Deputy Premier of the Turks and Caicos Islands
- In office 20 February 2021 – 27 February 2024
- Premier: Washington Misick
- Governor: Nigel Dakin
- Succeeded by: Jamell Robinson

Minister of Finance, Investment & Trade
- In office 6 August 2021 – 27 February 2024
- Preceded by: Washington Misick
- Succeeded by: Washington Misick

Minister of Health, Agriculture, Sports and Human Services
- In office 24 February 2021 – 6 August 2021
- Preceded by: Edwin Astwood
- Succeeded by: Jamell Robinson

2nd Member of Parliament for All Island District
- Incumbent
- Assumed office 20 February 2021 Serving with Washington Misick; Josephine Connolly; Jamell Rayan Robinson; Shaun David Malcolm
- Preceded by: Josephine Connolly

Personal details
- Party: Progressive National Party
- Spouse: Indrani Saunders (m. 1996)
- Children: Gabriel Saunders; Maya Saunders; Michael Saunders; Anjali Saunders
- Parent(s): Norman Saunders; Emily Saunders

Erwin Jay Saunders, also known as E. Jay Saunders, is a Turks and Caicos Islands businessman and politician who was the Deputy Premier of the Turks and Caicos Islands from February 2021 to February 2024. He was Minister of Finance, Investment & Trade from August 2021 to February 2024. He is the son of former Chief Minister Norman Saunders and former Speaker of the House, Emily Saunders.
