= 1984 Turks and Caicos Islands general election =

1984 Turks and Caicos Islands General Election
- May 29, 1984

11 seats in the Legislative Council 6 seats needed for a majority
- Registered: 3,790
- Turnout: 3,334 (88.0%)
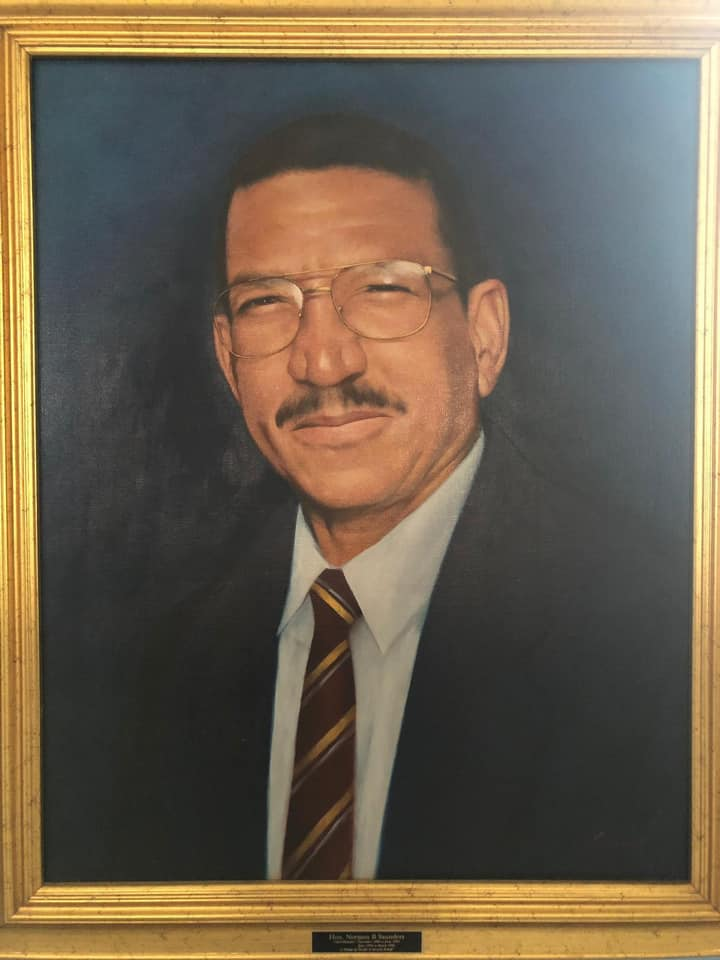

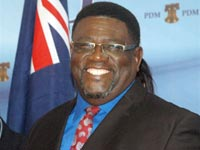
	First party	Second party
Leader	Norman B. Saunders Sr.	Oswald Skippings
Party	Progressive National Party	People's Democratic Movement
Leader's seat	South Caicos North	Grand Turk North Back Salina
Seats won	8	3
Seat change	No change	No change
Popular vote	1,940	1,371
Percentage	58.2%	41.1%
Chief Minister before election
Norman B. Saunders Sr.
Progressive National Party
Chief Minister after Election
Norman B. Saunders Sr.
Progressive National Party

General elections were held in the Turks and Caicos Islands on 29 May 1984. The result was a victory for the ruling Progressive National Party (PNP), which won eight of the eleven seats in the Legislative Council, including Kew North Caicos, where Rosita Butterfield became the islands' first female Legislative Council member. Following the elections, PNP leader Norman Saunders remained Chief Minister.

== Electoral system ==
The eleven members of the Legislative Council were elected from single-member constituencies.

== Campaign ==
A total of 22 candidates contested the elections, with both the PNP and People's Democratic Movement (PDM) running in all eleven constituencies.

== Results ==
Party	Votes	%	Seats	+/–
Progressive National Party	1,965	61.20	8	0
People's Democratic Movement	1,246	38.80	3	0
Total	3,211	100.00	11	0
Valid votes	3,211	99.32		
Invalid/blank votes	22	0.68		
Total votes	3,233	100.00		
Registered voters/turnout	3,792	85.26		
Source: Caribbean Elections
