= 1976 Turks and Caicos Islands general election =

1976 Turks and Caicos Islands General Election
- September 29, 1976

11 seats in the Legislative Council 6 seats needed for a majority
- Registered: 2,995
- Turnout: 2,550 (85.1%)
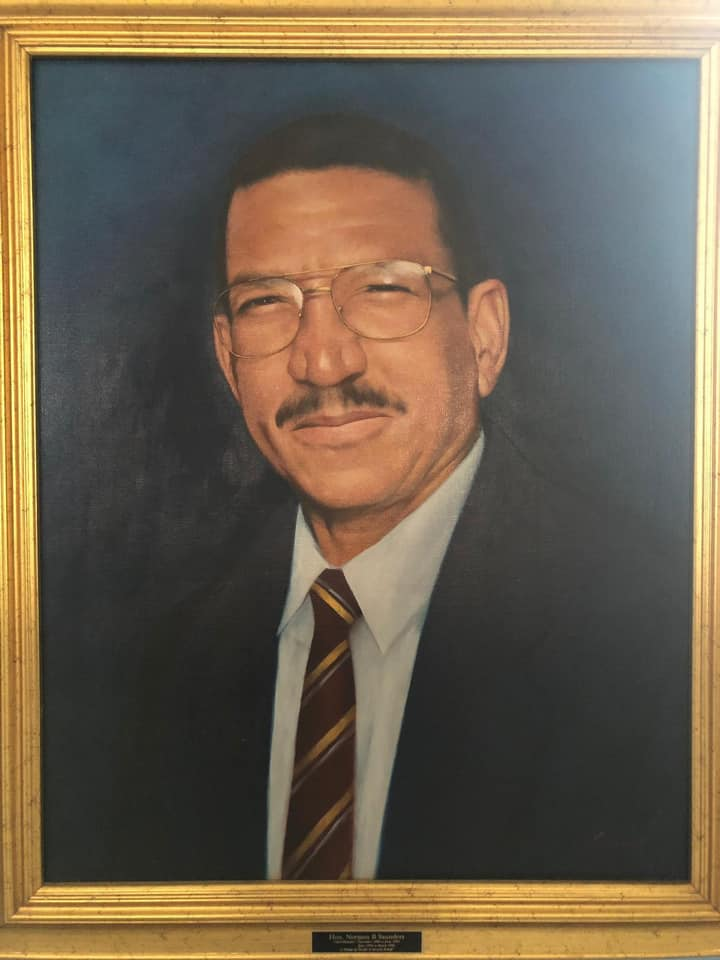
	First party	Second party
Leader	JAGS McCartney	Norman B. Saunders Sr.
Party	People's Democratic Movement	Progressive National Party
Leader's seat	Grand Turk North Back Salina	South Caicos North
Seats won	5	4
Popular vote	956	1,008
Percentage	37.5%	39.5%
Chief Minister after Election
JAGS McCartney
People's Democratic Movement

General elections were held in the Turks and Caicos Islands on 29 September 1976. Although the Progressive National Organisation (PNO) received the most votes, the People's Democratic Movement (PDM) emerged as the largest party in the Legislative Council, winning five of the eleven seats. Following the elections, the PDM formed a coalition government with the two independents, with PDM leader James Alexander George Smith McCartney becoming the first Chief Minister of the islands.

== Background ==
The PNO and PDM were both formed shortly before the elections. The PDM had its roots in the Junkanoo Club youth organisation formed in 1976, but was only formed in early 1976. The PNO was formed in the same year by members of the State Council.

== Electoral system ==
The eleven members of the Legislative Council were elected from single-member constituencies.

== Campaign ==
A total of 23 candidates contested the elections, with the new PNO contesting all 11 seats, the PDM running in eight seats. The other four candidates were independents.

== Results ==
Party	Votes	%	Seats
Progressive National Organisation	1,008	42.04	4
People's Democratic Movement	956	39.87	5
Independents	434	18.10	2
Total	2,398	100.00	11
Valid votes	2,398	98.44	
Invalid/blank votes	38	1.56	
Total votes	2,436	100.00	
Registered voters/turnout	2,995	81.34	
Source: Caribbean Elections
