= Galmo Williams =

2nd Premier of the Turks and Caicos Islands

The Honourable Galmo Williams

2nd Premier of the Turks and Caicos Islands
- In office 23 March 2009 – 14 August 2009
- Monarch: Elizabeth II
- Governor: Gordon Wetherell
- Preceded by: Michael Misick
- Succeeded by: Office suspended 2009–2012; Rufus Ewing

Member of Parliament for Long Bay Hills
- In office 9 August 2006 – 14 August 2009

Personal details
- Born: Oliver Galmo Williams
- Party: Progressive National Party
- Spouse: Althea Williams

The Honourable Galmo "Gilley" Williams is a Turks and Caicos Islander politician who served as the 2nd Premier of the Turks and Caicos Islands from 23 March 2009 to 14 August 2009.

== Early life ==
He was schooled at the Bottle Creek Primary School (now Adelaide Oemler Primary) and then at the Bottle Creek High School (now Raymond Gardiner High). He later attended the Miami Lakes Technical Institute from where he graduated with a diploma in Hospitality and Culinary Management.

== Political career ==
Williams served as the Cabinet minister responsible for Home Affairs and Public Safety within the Michael Misick administration. As such Williams oversaw the majority of the functions concerning: Immigration, Labour, Fire Services, Prisons, Natural Disaster, Road Safety, Registration of Births & Deaths, Emergency Services, Search and Rescue, Cadet Programme, and Coastal Petrol.

On 19 February 2009, Williams resigned from the Misick administration and launched his campaign to topple him as leader of the Progressive National Party (PNP). On 28 February 2009, Williams won a three-way battle for the position of leader of the PNP.

Following intense pressure from the Progressive National Party members, Misick resigned on 23 March 2009. Later in the afternoon Williams took the oath of office of the Premier, and became the second Premier of the Turks and Caicos Islands. However, the office of premier was suspended on August 14 and transferred to the governor, against the PNP's wishes.

== Notes ==
Political offices
Preceded by Michael Misick	Premier of the Turks and Caicos Islands; 2009	Vacant Office suspended 2009–2012 Title next held by Rufus Ewing
