= 2007 Turks and Caicos Islands general election =

2007 Turks and Caicos Islands General Election
- February 9, 2007

15 seats in the House of Assembly 8 seats needed for a majority
- Registered: 6,987
- Turnout: 6,010 (86.0%)
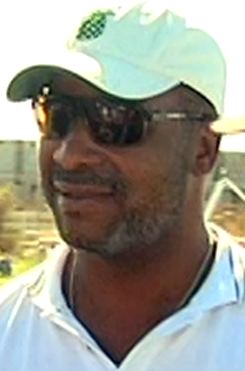
	First party	Second party
Leader	Michael Misick	Floyd Seymour
Party	Progressive National Party	People's Democratic Movement
Leader's seat	North Caicos	Grand Turk South Back Salina
Seats won	13	2
Seat change	▲5	▼3
Popular vote	3,609	2,320
Percentage	60.0%	38.6%
Chief Minister before election
Michael Misick
Progressive National Party
Premier after Election
Michael Misick
Progressive National Party

General elections were held in the Turks and Caicos Islands on 9 February 2007. The result was a victory for the ruling Progressive National Party (PNP), which won thirteen of the fifteen seats in the House of Assembly. PNP leader Michael Misick remained Premier.

== Electoral system ==
Constitutional changes in 2006 saw the Legislative Council renamed the House of Assembly and the number of seats increased from 13 to 15. Members were elected from single-member constituencies.

== Campaign ==
A total of 31 candidates contested the elections, with both the PNP and the People's Democratic Movement (PDM) running full slates of 15 candidates. The other candidate ran as an independent.

== Results ==
Party	Votes	%	Seats	+/–
Progressive National Party	3,609	60.83	13	+7
People's Democratic Movement	2,320	39.10	2	–5
Independents	4	0.07	0	New
Total	5,933	100.00	15	+2
Valid votes	5,933	98.72		
Invalid/blank votes	77	1.28		
Total votes	6,010	100.00		
Registered voters/turnout	6,897	87.14		
Source: Caribbean Elections

== Aftermath ==
The elections were observed by CARICOM and the Electoral Reform International Services from the United Kingdom. They noted that the election had been conducted freely and fairly but noted criticism of the electoral registration process and publication of the voters list.

Following the election, the British Foreign and Commonwealth Office investigated the Turks and Caicos government and found evidence of corruption, mostly around the Premier of the Turks and Caicos Islands, Michael Misick unlawfully selling off Crown land to fund investment as well as his cabinet engaging in corrupt activities. As a result, the United Kingdom suspended the Turks and Caicos Islands constitution, dissolved the elected House of Assembly and vested all power within the Governor of the Turks and Caicos Islands under the Royal Prerogative and introducing direct control from London. The constitution would remain suspended until 2012 when new elections were held.
