= 2021 Turks and Caicos Islands general election =

- 19 February 2021

15 of the 21 seats in the House of Assembly 8 seats needed for a majority
- Registered: 8,581
- Turnout: 75.28%
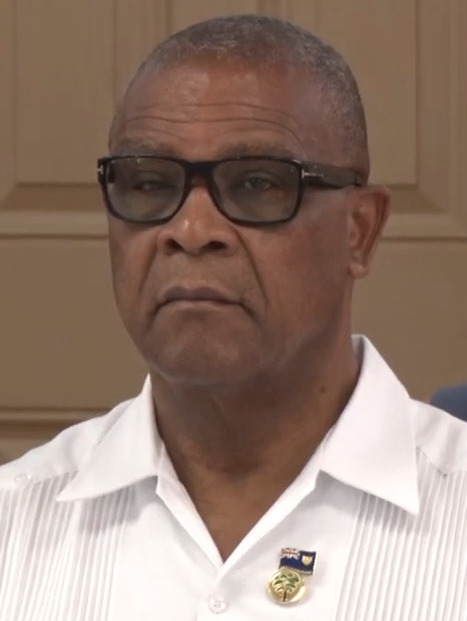

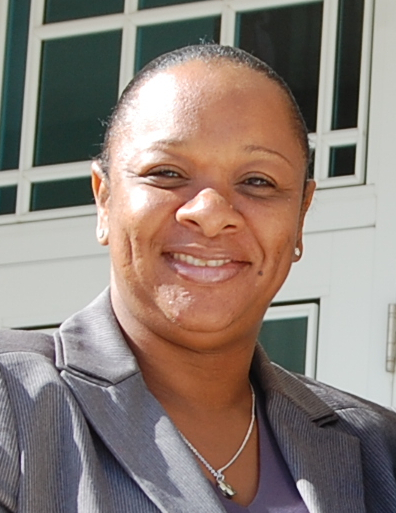
	First party	Second party
Leader	Washington Misick	Sharlene Cartwright-Robinson
Party	PNP	PDM
Seats won	14	1
Seat change	▲9	▼9
- Results by constituency
Premier before election
Sharlene Cartwright-Robinson
PDM
Elected Premier
Washington Misick
PNP

General elections were held in the Turks and Caicos Islands on 19 February 2021 to elect members of the House of Assembly. The result was a landslide victory for the Progressive National Party, which won 14 of the 15 seats in the House.

== Electoral system ==
At the time of the election, the House of Assembly has 21 members: 15 elected members, four appointed members and two ex officio members.

The 15 elected members were elected by two methods; ten were elected from single-member constituencies, with five elected on an at-large basis, with voters able to vote for up to five candidates at the national level.

The four appointed members include one nominated by the Premier, one nominated by the Leader of the Opposition and two members appointed by the Governor. In addition, the Attorney General and the Speaker are ex officio members.

== Results ==
Party	District			At-large			Total seats	+/–
Party	Votes	%	Seats	Votes	%	Seats	Total seats	+/–
Progressive National Party	3,572	55.29	9	17,111	56.34	5	14	+9
People's Democratic Movement	2,888	44.71	1	12,082	39.78	0	1	–9
Progressive Democratic Alliance				89	0.29	0	0	0
Independents				1,090	3.59	0	0	0
Nominated members							4	0
Ex officio members							2	0
Total	6,460	100.00	10	30,372	100.00	5	21	0
Valid votes	6,460	100.00						
Invalid/blank votes	0	0.00						
Total votes	6,460	100.00						
Registered voters/turnout	8,581	75.28						
Source: Elections Department

=== By constituency ===
Constituency		Candidate	Party	Votes
1	Grand Turk North	Otis Chuck Morris	Progressive National Party	362
1	Grand Turk North	Temard Rudardo Butterfield	People's Democratic Movement	239
2	Grand Turk South and Saltcay	Edwin Astwood	People's Democratic Movement	414
2	Grand Turk South and Saltcay	Leshun Sebastian Missick	Progressive National Party	297
3	South Caicos	John Jamael Malcolm	Progressive National Party	190
3	South Caicos	Patrease Thomas	People's Democratic Movement	109
4	Middle and North Caicos	Arlington Alexander Musgrove	Progressive National Party	293
4	Middle and North Caicos	Ralph Lewis Higgs	People's Democratic Movement	220
5	Leeward (Providenciales)	Akierra Missick	Progressive National Party	460
5	Leeward (Providenciales)	Gertrude Forbes	People's Democratic Movement	249
6	The Bight (Providenciales)	Matthew Timothy Stubbs	Progressive National Party	367
6	The Bight (Providenciales)	Audric Skippings	People's Democratic Movement	299
7	Cheshire Hall and Richmond Hill (Providenciales)	Samuel Ernest Been	Progressive National Party	487
7	Cheshire Hall and Richmond Hill (Providenciales)	Douglas Parnell	People's Democratic Movement	411
8	Blue Hills (Providenciales)	Randy Dexter Howell	Progressive National Party	333
8	Blue Hills (Providenciales)	Goldray Ewing	People's Democratic Movement	318
9	Five Cays (Providenciales)	Rachel Marshall Taylor	Progressive National Party	510
9	Five Cays (Providenciales)	Sean Rickard Astwood	People's Democratic Movement	369
10	Wheeland (Providenciales)	Kyle Knowles	Progressive National Party	273
10	Wheeland (Providenciales)	Vaden Delroy Williams	People's Democratic Movement	270
All Island District; 5 elected at-large
All Island District; 5 elected at-large		Washington Misick	Progressive National Party	3,594
All Island District; 5 elected at-large		Erwin Jay Saunders	Progressive National Party	3,478
All Island District; 5 elected at-large		Josephine Connolly	Progressive National Party	3,464
All Island District; 5 elected at-large		Jamell Robinson	Progressive National Party	3,418
All Island District; 5 elected at-large		Shaun David Malcolm	Progressive National Party	3,151
All Island District; 5 elected at-large		Robert A. Been	People's Democratic Movement	2,572
All Island District; 5 elected at-large		Karen Evadne Malcolm	People's Democratic Movement	2,491
All Island District; 5 elected at-large		Sharlene Cartwright-Robinson	People's Democratic Movement	2,470
All Island District; 5 elected at-large		Derek Hugh Taylor	People's Democratic Movement	2,352
All Island District; 5 elected at-large		Maxovonno Thomas	People's Democratic Movement	2,242
All Island District; 5 elected at-large		Jacqueline Almartha Lightbourne	Independent	300
All Island District; 5 elected at-large		Courtney Mancur Missick	Independent	280
All Island District; 5 elected at-large		George Lightbourne	Independent	162
All Island District; 5 elected at-large		Lekensay K.D. Missick	Independent	107
All Island District; 5 elected at-large		Winston McLaughlin	Progressive Democratic Alliance	89
All Island District; 5 elected at-large		Jermain Richardson Fulford	Independent	85
All Island District; 5 elected at-large		Alicia Kaye Swann	Independent	81
All Island District; 5 elected at-large		Lucky Shemock Forbes	Independent	75
Source: Elections Department
