= Sharlene Cartwright-Robinson =

Turks and Caicos Islands politician

The Honourable Sharlene Cartwright-Robinson
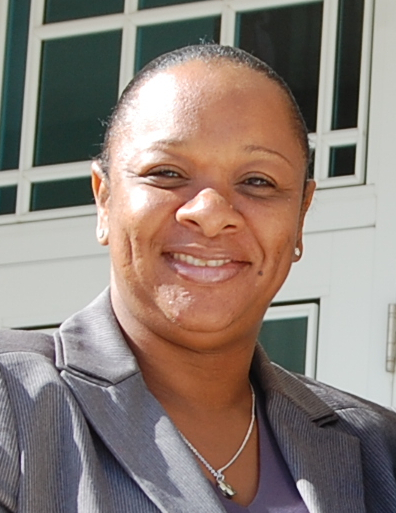
- Cartwright-Robinson in 2012

4th Premier of the Turks and Caicos Islands
- In office 20 December 2016 – 20 February 2021
- Monarch: Elizabeth II
- Governor: John Freeman; Nigel Dakin
- Preceded by: Rufus Ewing
- Succeeded by: Washington Misick

Leader of the Opposition
- In office 13 February 2012 – 20 December 2016
- Premier: Rufus Ewing
- Governor: Ric Todd; Peter Beckingham; John Freeman

Leader of the People's Democratic Movement
- In office 15 November 2012 – 21 February 2021
- Deputy: Sean Astwood
- Preceded by: Oswald Skippings
- Succeeded by: Edwin Astwood

Personal details
- Born: 4 September 1971 (age 54) The Bahamas
- Party: People's Democratic Movement
- Spouse: Lorne Robinson

Sharlene Linette Cartwright-Robinson JP (born 4 September 1971) is a Turks and Caicos Islander politician and lawyer who served as the 4th Premier of the Turks and Caicos Islands from 20 December 2016 to 20 February 2021. She was the territory's first female premier. She was also the first woman to become first, deputy head, and then, head of the People's Democratic Movement (PDM).

== Career ==
Cartwright-Robinson passed the bar in 1998. Her political career began the following year with an appointment to the Legislative Council, in which capacity she chaired a variety of committees, and served until 2003. She stood as a candidate in the 2003 election, but was defeated. After self-government in the Turks and Caicos Islands was suspended in 2009, she became a member of the Consultative Forum. She was removed from that position in May 2012 after Governor Ric Todd indicated that people planning to run in the November election should not continue to sit on the Advisory Council or the Consultative Forum.

In July 2012, Cartwright-Robinson was named Deputy Leader of the PDM, under Leader Oswald Skippings. In the 2012 election, she ran as one of the eleven candidates for the five at-large seats in the All Island District, where she obtained the highest number of votes. Due to provisions in the new 2011 Constitution of the Turks and Caicos Islands, running for election required her to renounce her birth-right citizenship in the Bahamas. Following the general election, her party (the PDM) elected her the Party Leader.

Cartwright-Robinson led her People's Democratic Movement to a victory in the December 2016 general election beating out two male candidates for the premiership. This ended the thirteen year ruling stretch of the Progressive National Party (PNP).

She led the country during the COVID-19 pandemic in the Turks and Caicos Islands in 2020.

In February 2021, Cartwright-Robinson lost her seat in the 2021 Turks and Caicos Islands general election where her party lost 9 seats in a 14-1 blowout defeat. Following this, she stepped down as leader of the party.

== Personal life ==
Cartwright-Robinson was born in the Bahamas on 4 September 1971 to Turks and Caicos Islands parents who were working there and was issued with a Bahamian passport. Her family returned to the Turks and Caicos Islands when she was six.

Cartwright-Robinson is Baptist. She has served as Youth Director of the Turks and Caicos Islands Baptist Union since 2006. In 2012, she also became president of the Caribbean Baptist Fellowship's Youth Department, making her ex officio a member of the CBF executive board as well as a vice president of the Baptist World Alliance Youth Committee. She is also an active member of the Kiwanis Club.

== See also ==
- First women lawyers around the world

Political offices
Preceded by Rufus Ewing	Premier of the Turks and Caicos Islands; 2016–2021	Succeeded by Washington Misick
