= Edwin Astwood =

Turks and Caicos Islands politician (born 1973)

The Honourable Edwin Astwood MHA

Leader of the Opposition
- Incumbent
- Assumed office 22 February 2021
- Premier: Charles Washington Misick
- Governor: Nigel Dakin
- Preceded by: Charles Washington Misick

Member of Parliament for Grand Turk South & Salt Cay
- Incumbent
- Assumed office 11 November 2012
- Majority: 48 (49.3%)

Leader of the People's Democratic Movement
- Incumbent
- Assumed office 26 June 2021
- Deputy: TBD
- Preceded by: Sharlene Cartwright-Robinson

Personal details
- Born: 24 August 1973 (age 53) Grand Turk
- Party: People's Democratic Movement
- Education: Nova Southeastern University (MBA); University of Technology (B.S.)

Edwin Andre Astwood (born 24 August 1973) is a politician from the Turks and Caicos Islands who has been Leader of the Opposition since February 2021 and Leader of the PDM party since June 2021. He served as Minister of Health, Agriculture and Human Services from 2016 to 2021. Astwood has been a Member of the House of Assembly for Grand Turk South & Salt Cay since November 2012. He is the son of one of the founders of the People's Democratic Movement (PDM), Lewis Edwin Astwood III.

== Leadership of the People's Democratic Movement ==
Following the landslide victory of the PNP in the 2021 election, Astwood was the only candidate of his party to win his seat in the House of Assembly. Then Premier and Astwood's party leader, Sharlene Cartwright-Robinson stepped down as party leader in the days following and her deputy, Sean Astwood became the acting party leader until the party would be able to elect a leader at their next convention. Sean Astwood later announced his own resignation from leadership of the paper in June 2021. After some weeks of uncertainty, at a virtual convention held on 26 June 2021, Edwin Astwood, Leader of the Opposition was appointed as the new leader of the PDM.

Under Astwood’s leadership, the PDM continued to face significant challenges. In the 2025 general election, the party experienced another historic defeat, securing only 2 of the 19 available seats in the House of Assembly. This result marked one of the party's poorest performances in its history, raising questions about the party’s future direction and Astwood’s leadership.
