= Michael Misick =

1st Premier of the Turks and Caicos Islands

The Honourable Michael Misick
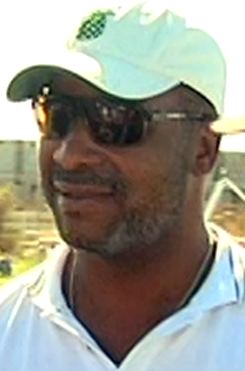
- Misick in 2008

1st Premier of the Turks and Caicos Islands
- In office 9 August 2006 – 23 March 2009
- Monarch: Elizabeth II
- Governor: Richard Tauwhare; Mahala Wynns (Acting); Gordon Wetherell
- Preceded by: New office
- Succeeded by: Galmo Williams

7th Chief Minister of the Turks and Caicos Islands
- In office 15 August 2003 – 9 August 2006
- Monarch: Elizabeth II
- Governor: Jim Poston; Mahala Wynns (Acting); Richard Tauwhare
- Preceded by: Derek Hugh Taylor
- Succeeded by: Office ceased to exist

Personal details
- Born: Michael Eugene Misick; 2 February 1966 (age 60) Bottle Creek, North Caicos, Turks and Caicos Islands
- Party: Progressive National Party
- Spouses: LisaRaye McCoy (m. 2006; div. 2008) Tatjana van de Merwe (m. 2018)
- Relations: Washington Misick (brother)
- Education: University of Buckingham
- Nickname(s): Iron Mike; Your Brother's Keeper; The Man of the People

Michael Eugene Misick (/ˈmɪzɪk/; born 2 February 1966) is a Turks and Caicos Islander politician who was the 7th Chief Minister of the Turks and Caicos Islands from 15 August 2003 to 9 August 2006 and was the 1st Premier of the Turks and Caicos Islands from 9 August 2006 to 23 March 2009. Misick is a member of the Progressive National Party (PNP) and became chief minister when his party, after eight years as the opposition party, gained two parliamentary seats in by-elections. In addition to being premier, he was also the minister for Civil Aviation, Commerce and Development, Planning, District Administration, Broadcasting Commission, Tourist Board, Turks and Caicos Investment Agency, and Tourism. Several other members of Misick's family have been politicians in the Turks and Caicos Islands, and important leaders in the PNP. Washington Misick, his brother, is the current Premier, former Chief Minister and former Minister of Finance.

== Biography ==
Born in Bottle Creek, North Caicos, Misick is one of 12 children of Mr and Mrs Charles Misick. He received his foundation education in North Caicos and then furthered it at the Turks and Caicos High School (Helena Jones Robinson High School), the Miami Lakes Technical Institute (where he graduated with a certificate in Business Studies), and the University of Buckingham (LLB, Hons. Bachelor of Law). Misick is a Barrister at Law of England and Wales and an Attorney at Law of Turks and Caicos Islands. He is a member of the Honourable Society of Lincoln’s Inn.

Misick spent several years in the private sector where he was sales manager for Prestigious Properties Ltd. from 1984 to 1986 and managing director from 1986 to 1988. From 1988 to 1991, he was chairman and CEO of Paramount Group of Companies, a property and financial services company. Misick was first elected to the Legislative Council in 1991, when he became Minister of Tourism, Transportation and Communications. He was re-elected in 1995. In March 2002, he was elected leader of the then opposition PNP thus succeeding Washington Misick. In the April 2003 general elections, Misick's party won six out of the possible 13 seats in the legislature. The successful petitioning and winning of by-elections held in two constituencies resulted in Misick being sworn in as Chief Minister of the Turks and Caicos Islands on 15 August 2003, four months after the election.

== Personal ==
Misick has six children with five different women. His first marriage was to Yvette Marcelin, an attorney. In April 2006, Michael Misick married American actress LisaRaye McCoy. A statement released on 12 August 2008 to the press by Misick stated: "I am announcing that I am separated from LisaRaye McCoy, I am committed to dissolving the marriage amicably. I believe that this is a private matter and will have no further comments. I hope that our privacy will be respected." The two were divorced in 2008.

In 2013, he became engaged to Netherlands native Tatjana van de Merwe of Santo Domingo, Dominican Republic. They married in August 2018.

== Political career ==
=== Corruption allegations ===
In 2008, a Foreign Affairs Select Committee of British Members of Parliament conducting a routine review of the administration in British Overseas Territories received several reports of high-level official corruption in the Turks and Caicos. Their report charged that Misick, "who is alleged to have built up a multi-million dollar fortune since he was elected in 2003 when he declared assets of only $50,000 (£25,000)," enriched himself and fellow ministers "by selling off Crown land to fund current investment." In response, the Governor of the Turks and Caicos Islands Richard Tauwhare announced the appointment of a Commission of Enquiry into corruption on 10 July 2008.

=== Rape allegation ===
On 7 January 2007, Misick called for general elections on 9 February. The PNP won 13 of the 15 seats, making it one of the most lopsided election results in the Turks and Caicos Islands.

Misick was accused of raping an American woman on 28 March 2008. The claim against Misick failed, and the woman subsequently brought proceedings against her employers in Florida.

=== Resignation ===
On 15 December 2008, Misick was asked to step down by nine members of his party. Misick, who has denied any wrongdoing, resigned on 23 March 2009 after an investigation found "clear signs of corruption" in Turks and Caicos. The UK Foreign Office said it would suspend the constitution and give control to Governor Gordon Wetherell. The departure of the premier occurred a week earlier than expected. While the investigations were underway, Governor Gordon Wetherell suspended self-government in the islands on 16 August 2009.

In June 2011, Misick's assets were frozen by a court order. In September 2010 a report from the Turks and Caicos Islands 2008-9 Commission of Inquiry recommended criminal investigation of Misick of possible corruption and abuse of his former position.

=== Arrest and trial ===
On 7 December 2012, Michael Misick was arrested at Santos Dumont Airport, Rio de Janeiro, Brazil, after being located by Interpol. He was arrested while trying to leave for São Paulo. The arrest warrant was issued by Minister Ricardo Lewandowski of the Supreme Federal Court of Brazil on 22 November, at the request of the government of the United Kingdom.

He was returned to Turks and Caicos on 7 January 2014 where he was questioned at the capital's police headquarters. He was briefly remanded at Her Majesty’s Prison Grand Turk before being released on bail on 13 January 2014 ahead of his trial. He was charged with conspiracy to receive bribes, conspiracy to defraud the government and money laundering. His much-delayed trial began on 18 January 2016, and was still on-going a year later. The trial was continuing in 2019 and 2020 until the COVID-19 pandemic resulted in another postponement.

On February 2, 2026, he was found guilty of offences of bribery and money laundering. He was sentenced to four years' imprisonment on May 29, 2026.

=== Political comeback attempt ===
In December 2016, Misick stood as an at-large candidate in the general elections in Turks and Caicos Island as an independent. However, he received only 5.57% of the vote and was not elected.

Political offices
| Preceded by Derek Hugh Taylor | Chief Minister of the Turks and Caicos Islands; 2003–2006 | Succeeded by Position abolished |
| Preceded by New position | Premier of the Turks and Caicos Islands; 2006–2009 | Succeeded by Galmo Williams |
