= 2003 Turks and Caicos Islands general election =

2003 Turks and Caicos Islands General Election
- April 24, 2003

13 seats in the Legislative Council 7 seats needed for a majority
- Registered: 6,551
- Turnout: 5,529 (84.4%)
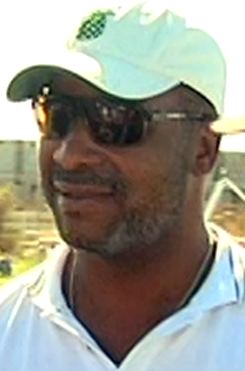
	First party	Second party
Leader	Michael Misick	Derek Taylor
Party	Progressive National Party	People's Democratic Movement
Leader's seat	North Caicos East	Grand Turk South Back Salina
Seats won	8	5
Seat change	▲4	▼4
Popular vote	Needed	Needed
Percentage	Needed	Needed
Chief Minister before election
Derek Taylor
People's Democratic Movement
Chief Minister after Election
Michael Misick
Progressive National Party

General elections were held in the Turks and Caicos Islands on 24 April 2003. The result was initially a victory for the ruling People's Democratic Movement (PDM), which won seven of the thirteen seats in the Legislative Council, with PDM leader Derek Hugh Taylor remaining Chief Minister. However, a court order resulted in the results in South Caicos North (won by the PDM's Noel Skippings by two votes) and Five Cays Providenciales (won by the PDM's Sean Astwood by five votes) being annulled. The opposition PNP won both seats in the subsequent by-elections and subsequently formed a government in August with Michael Misick becoming Chief Minister.

== Electoral system ==
The thirteen members of the Legislative Council were elected from single-member constituencies.

== Campaign ==
A total of 26 candidates contested the elections, with both the PDM and the PNP running full slates of 13 candidates.

== Initial Results ==
Party	Votes	%	Seats	+/–
People's Democratic Movement	2,747	50.20	7	–2
Progressive National Party	2,725	49.80	6	+2
Total	5,472	100.00	13	0
Valid votes	5,472	98.97		
Invalid/blank votes	57	1.03		
Total votes	5,529	100.00		
Registered voters/turnout	6,551	84.40		
Source: Caribbean Elections
