= 2012 Turks and Caicos Islands general election =

2012 Turks and Caicos Islands General Election
- November 9, 2012

15 seats in the House of Assembly 8 seats needed for a majority
- Registered: 7,337
- Turnout: 6,393 (87.1%)
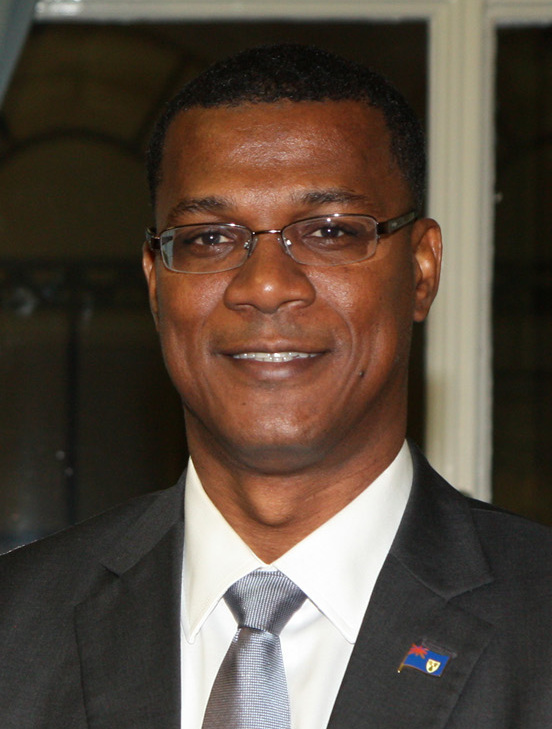

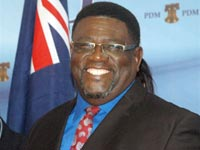
	First party	Second party	Third party
Leader	Rufus Ewing	Oswald Skippings	Harold Charles
Party	Progressive National Party	People's Democratic Movement	People's Progressive Party
Leader's seat	At-Large/All-Island	At-Large/All-Island	Five Cays
Seats won	8	7	0
Seat change	▼5	▲5	No change
Popular vote	17,597	18,595	310
Percentage	47.7%	50.4%	0.8%
Premier before election
None
Office suspended
Premier after Election
Rufus Ewing
Progressive National Party

General elections were held in Turks and Caicos Islands on 9 November 2012. The PNP won the election, winning eight seats with the PDM winning seven. The PNP won most of its seats by narrow margins over the PDM, while the PDM won its seats by wide margins over the PNP, with the result that despite winning fewer seats and thereby losing the election, the PDM garnered more overall votes nationwide.

== Background ==
In 2009 the British government had imposed direct rule over the islands after an inquiry discovered evidence of corruption and incompetence in the islands' government. The islands' government was suspended for two years and the British-appointed governor given executive power over the territory.

On 12 June 2012 British Foreign Secretary William Hague announced that fresh elections would be held in November 2012, stating that there had been "significant progress with an ambitious reform programme" and that there had been "sufficient progress, on the milestones and on putting in place robust financial controls"

A new constitution came into force on 15 October 2012. The terms of the election are specified in the constitution.

== Electoral system ==
Following the 2007 elections, the number of single-member constituencies was reduced from 15 to 10. However, an additional five members were elected at-large at the national level, with voters able to vote for up to five at-large candidates. According to a report on 12 October, there were 6,896 verified electors in the Electors Register, with an additional 349 to be published in a supplementary register later.

== Candidates ==
On Nomination Day, 25 October, a total of thirty-seven candidates were officially nominated. Among them were fifteen each from the Progressive National Party (PNP) and the People's Democratic Movement (PDM), five from the newly formed People's Progressive Party (PPP), and two independents.

The below list of candidates comes from the Turks and Caicos Islands Elections Office. Election results were confirmed on November 9, 2012, for local voting districts, and on November 12, 2012, for the at-large seats.

== Results ==
Party	District			At-large			Total seats	+/–
Party	Votes	%	Seats	Votes	%	Seats	Total seats	+/–
People's Democratic Movement	3,164	50.13	4	15,431	50.71	3	7	+5
Progressive National Party	2,833	44.89	6	14,764	48.52	2	8	–5
People's Progressive Party	310	4.91	0				0	New
Independents	4	0.06	0	233	0.77	0	0	0
Nominated members							4	–
Ex officio members							2	–
Total	6,311	100.00	10	30,428	100.00	5	21	0
Valid votes	6,311	99.35						
Invalid/blank votes	41	0.65						
Total votes	6,352	100.00						
Registered voters/turnout	7,245	87.67						
Source: Caribbean Elections

=== By constituency ===
Constituency	Candidate	Party	Votes
1. Grand Turk North	George Alexander Lightbourne	Progressive National Party	353
1. Grand Turk North	Derek Anthonio Rolle	People's Democratic Movement	336
2. Grand Turk South	Edwin Astwood	People's Democratic Movement	524
2. Grand Turk South	Rex Elton Swann	Progressive National Party	292
3. South Caicos	Norman Benjamin Saunders	Progressive National Party	219
3. South Caicos	Edith Andrea Cox	People's Democratic Movement	132
4. Middle and North Caicos	Ricardo Don Hue Gardiner	Progressive National Party	261
4. Middle and North Caicos	Ashwood Leon Forbes	People's Democratic Movement	250
5. Leeward	Akierra M. Missick	Progressive National Party	337
5. Leeward	Ezra Ringo Tyrone Taylor	People's Democratic Movement	305
5. Leeward	Bennett Williams	Independent	4
6. The Bight	Porsha Monique Stubbs Smith	Progressive National Party	335
6. The Bight	Sonny Alexander Forbes	People's Democratic Movement	294
6. The Bight	Dorell Monique Pratt Delancy	People's Progressive Party	36
7. Cheshire Hall and Richmond Hill; (results voided in February 2013)	Amanda A. Misick	Progressive National Party	394
7. Cheshire Hall and Richmond Hill; (results voided in February 2013)	Isaac Oral Selver	People's Democratic Movement	364
7. Cheshire Hall and Richmond Hill; (results voided in February 2013)	Edward E. Smith	People's Progressive Party	58
8. Blue Hills	Goldray McMillin Ewing	People's Democratic Movement	347
8. Blue Hills	Adrian Carlyle Williams	Progressive National Party	232
8. Blue Hills	Wendal D. Wilson	People's Progressive Party	84
9. Five Cays	Sean Rickard Astwood	People's Democratic Movement	347
9. Five Cays	Thomas I.N. Ewing	Progressive National Party	253
9. Five Cays	Harold Charles	People's Progressive Party	103
10. Wheeland	Vaden Delroy Williams	People's Democratic Movement	265
10. Wheeland	Gregory O'Neal Lightbourne	Progressive National Party	157
10. Wheeland	Zhavargo J. Jolly	People's Progressive Party	29
All Island District; 5 elected at-large
All Island District; 5 elected at-large	Sharlene Linette Cartwright Robinson	People's Democratic Movement	3,427
All Island District; 5 elected at-large	Rufus Washington Ewing	Progressive National Party	3,252
All Island District; 5 elected at-large	Derek Taylor	People's Democratic Movement	3,191
All Island District; 5 elected at-large	Charles Washington Misick	Progressive National Party	3,107
All Island District; 5 elected at-large	Josephine Connolly	People's Democratic Movement	3,023
All Island District; 5 elected at-large	Carlos W. Simons	Progressive National Party	2,899
All Island District; 5 elected at-large	Samuel I. Harvey	People's Democratic Movement	2,896
All Island District; 5 elected at-large	Oswald O'Neal Skippings	People's Democratic Movement	2,894
All Island District; 5 elected at-large	Wayne Newton Garland	Progressive National Party	2,806
All Island District; 5 elected at-large	Royal Stephenson Robinson	Progressive National Party	2,700
All Island District; 5 elected at-large	Oswald M. Simons	Independent	233

== Subsequent by-election ==
PDM candidate Isaac Selver filed an election petition in the Supreme Court regarding the results in Electoral District 7, in which he had lost to Amanda Misick of the PNP by 30 votes. Selver's petition stated that PPP candidate Edward Smith was ineligible to stand for election by reason of his dual citizenship and dual allegiance to the United States and the Turks and Caicos Islands, and that the 58 votes that went to Smith had affected the outcome of the election and could have resulted in Selver's victory over Misick. In a December 2012 interview, Smith claimed that he had renounced U.S. citizenship by taking an oath of allegiance to the Queen in order to take up a position in the Turks and Caicos government. However, he had used his United States passport to travel to the United States in July 2012 after that oath. On 7 February 2013, the Supreme Court ruled the election void. A by-election was held on 22 March 2013. Amanda Misick won with 455 votes against Isaac Selver's 385.
