= Derek Hugh Taylor =

Chief minister of the Turks and Caicos Islands (born 1951)

6th Chief Minister of the Turks and Caicos Islands
- In office 31 January 1995 – 15 August 2004
- Monarch: Elizabeth II
- Governor: Martin Bourke; John Kelly; Mervyn Jones; Cynthia Astwood (Acting); Jim Poston
- Preceded by: Washington Misick
- Succeeded by: Michael Misick

Personal details
- Born: 1 October 1951 (age 74) Turks and Caicos Islands
- Party: People's Democratic Movement

Derek Hugh Taylor (born 1 October 1951) is a Turks and Caicos Islander politician who served as the 6th Chief Minister of the Turks and Caicos Islands from 31 January 1995 to 15 August 2004. He is the former leader of the People's Democratic Movement (PDM) party.

He was re-elected to the Turks and Caicos Islands House of Assembly as an at-large member in the 2012 general elections but later lost his seat in the 2021 general elections as he didn't make it into the top 5 At-Large, as received the 9th most votes with 2,352 votes.

== Notes ==
Political offices
Preceded by Washington Misick	Chief Minister of the Turks and Caicos Islands; 1995–2004	Succeeded by Michael Misick
