= People's Democratic Movement (Turks and Caicos Islands) =

- Abbreviation: PDM
- Leader: Edwin Astwood
- Chairperson: Patricia Saunders-Missick
- Founded: 1975
- Ideology: Conservatism; Christian democracy
- Political position: Centre-right
- International affiliation: International Democracy Union; Caribbean Democrat Union
- Colours: Blue; Gold
- UK affiliation: none
- House of Assembly: 2 / 21

Website
- pdmtci.com

The People's Democratic Movement is a political party in the Turks and Caicos Islands founded by James Alexander George Smith McCartney and Lewis Edwin Astwood III. The party is led by the current opposition leader, Edwin Astwood.

According to the PDM's website, the People's Democratic Movement (PDM) is the oldest established political organization in the Turks and Caicos Islands. Founded in October 1975, the PDM was the first party to be elected to head the Government.

At the 2003 legislative elections, the party won 7 out of 13 seats. It lost two of these seats at a by-election on 7 August 2003. In the 9 February 2007 elections the party won only 2 out of 15 seats.

In July 2012, Oswald Skippings was elected as the leader of the PDM, while Sharlene Cartwright-Robinson defeated Sean Astwood to become the party's first-ever female deputy leader. The party fielded 15 candidates in the 2012 election. On November 9, 2012 the PDM was defeated by the PNP and Oswald Skippings stepped down as leader.

== Electoral performance ==
Election	Leader	No. of votes	Share of votes	Seats	Result
1976	JAGS McCartney	956	39.8%	5 / 11	Government (with independents)
1980	Oswald Skippings	1,134	39.6%	3 / 11	Opposition
1984	Clement Howell	1,246	38.8%	3 / 11	Opposition
1988	Oswald Skippings	5,495	59.7%	11 / 13	Government
1991	Oswald Skippings	4,542	48.4%	8 / 13	Opposition
1995	Derek Taylor	2,058	49.9%	8 / 13	Government
1999	Derek Taylor	2,362	52.2%	9 / 13	Government
2003	Derek Taylor	2,747	50.2%	6 / 13	Opposition
2007	Floyd Seymour	2,320	39.1%	2 / 15	Opposition
2012	Oswald Skippings	3,164	44.8%	7 / 15	Opposition
2016	Sharlene Cartwright-Robinson	3,169	51.2%	10 / 15	Government
2021	Sharlene Cartwright-Robinson	2,888	44.7%	1 / 15	Opposition
2025	Edwin Astwood	2,578	38.14%	2 / 21	Opposition
