= Progressive National Party (Turks and Caicos Islands) =

- Abbreviation: PNP
- Leader: Washington Misick (Premier)
- Chairperson: Delcean Simmons
- Secretary-General: Sonia Williams
- Founder: Norman B. Saunders Sr. Nathaniel Francis; Headley Durham; Hilly Ewing; Albray V. Butterfield Sr. Charles Missick; Alexander Smith
- Founded: 1976
- Ideology: Social democracy Christian democracy
- Political position: Centre-left
- Colors: Yellow
- House of Assembly: 16 / 21

Website
- http://www.tcipnp.me/

The Progressive National Party is a political party in the Turks and Caicos Islands, currently led by Washington Misick. The PNP holds 16 of the 21 elected seats in the House of Assembly and has been the government since 20 Feb 2021.

== History ==
=== Origins and Founding of the Progressive National Party ===
In the early 1970s, elected members of the Legislative Assembly grew increasingly frustrated with the limited authority granted under the existing bicameral system of government, where real power remained with British-appointed administrators. By 1975, this frustration had led to a united call among elected representatives for constitutional reform that would allow for Ministerial Government and greater local decision-making.

A delegation of elected officials—including Norman B. Saunders Sr., Nathaniel Francis, Headley Durham, Albray V. Butterfield Sr., Charles Missick, Hilly Ewing, and Alexander Smith—entered into negotiations with the British Government. On the advice of Ivan Buchanan, the group retained the services of constitutional lawyer Dr. Billy Herbert to support the talks. With limited public funding available, the legal effort was primarily financed by Saunders and Butterfield, with additional private support from businessman Robin Laing. These efforts resulted in the 1976 Constitution, which introduced Ministerial Government and paved the way for the establishment of political parties in the Turks and Caicos Islands.

Following the passage of the new Constitution, Saunders and several other sitting legislators co-founded the Progressive National Organization (PNO), which was later renamed the Progressive National Party (PNP). The founding group included Saunders, Francis, Durham, Butterfield, Ewing, Missick, and Smith. In the lead-up to the 1976 General Election, the group formalized its leadership structure. Both Saunders and Francis were expected to contest the leadership of the Progressive National Organization, and each had their name put forward at nomination. However, Francis withdrew his candidacy, stating that Saunders had “everything to make an able leader of the party.” Saunders then received unanimous support as the Progressive National Organization’s first leader.

=== Electoral history ===
==== 1976 Turks and Caicos Islands General Election ====
The 1976 Turks and Caicos Islands General Election marked a pivotal moment in Turks and Caicos Islands politics, as it was the first to be held under the newly adopted Constitution introducing Ministerial Government. In the lead-up to the election, the Progressive National Organization (PNO) unanimously selected Norman B. Saunders Sr. as its first leader.

In the election itself, no single party won a clear majority. The People’s Democratic Movement (PDM) secured five seats, while the PNO won four. The remaining two seats were held by independents Liam McGuire and Danny Williams. Saunders and the PNO sought to form Government and engaged both independents in discussions. However, when McGuire requested a ministerial appointment—specifically the Ministry of Development—in exchange for his support, the PNO declined. The PNO unanimously agreed that McGuire, an Englishman and therefore a foreigner, should not hold a permanent office in Government. “We were proud to be the Opposition rather than having McGuire in our midst with that authority.”

McGuire “wanted to be everything,” expressing a desire to control several of the most influential ministerial roles. The PNO collectively agreed they would rather serve in Opposition than concede to his demands.

McGuire’s alignment with the PDM gave the PDM the majority needed to form the first government under the new constitutional framework. When McGuire and Williams joined the PDM, McGuire assumed control of key ministries—including Development and Tourism—leading many to refer to him as "the de facto Chief Minister".

Saunders, having led the PNO’s 1976 election campaign, became the Turks and Caicos Islands' first Leader of the Opposition after his party declined to form Government under the terms proposed by the independent candidates.

Despite the setback, the PNO continued building its organizational foundation and broadened its support across the Turks and Caicos Islands. During this period, the group formally adopted the name Progressive National Party (PNP), a step that coincided with a broader political consolidation that would lead to a landslide victory in the 1980 Turks and Caicos Islands General Election.

==== 1980 Turks and Caicos Islands General Election ====
In the 1980 Turks and Caicos Islands General Election, the Progressive National Party (PNP), led by Hon. Norman B. Saunders Sr., achieved its first electoral victory, winning eight of eleven seats in the Legislative Council and securing 59.2% of the popular vote. Saunders, who ran in South Caicos - North, won with 84.5% of the vote and subsequently became the third Chief Minister of the Turks and Caicos Islands—the second to be elected through a general election, and the first from the Progressive National Party. The party won every seat across the Turks and Caicos Islands except for three of the four constituencies in Grand Turk: Grand Turk - West Road, Grand Turk - North Back Salina, and Grand Turk - South.

This election was held against the backdrop of a proposed push for independence. In 1979, then-Chief Minister JAGS McCartney submitted a proposal for independence to the British Government, which was accepted. In response, Saunders—joined by PNP members Daniel Malcolm and Nathaniel Francis—travelled to London to voice opposition. At the time, the Turks and Caicos Islands was receiving grant-in-aid from the British Government to pay civil service salaries and support national infrastructure. Saunders argued that seeking independence while still financially dependent would leave the country vulnerable, stating that the Turks and Caicos Islands must not become "the world’s beggars”, and that the territory should not pursue independence until it could balance its own budget.

The British Government ultimately decided that the outcome of the 1980 Turks and Caicos Islands General Election would determine the territory’s immediate path forward. Under Saunders' leadership, the PNP’s stance against premature independence became a defining campaign issue—one that resonated with the electorate and contributed significantly to the Progressive National Party's success at the polls.

==== 1984 Turks and Caicos Islands General Election ====
In the 1984 Turks and Caicos Islands General Election, the Progressive National Party (PNP), under the continued leadership of Hon. Norman B. Saunders, secured a second consecutive electoral victory. The party won eight of the eleven seats in the Legislative Council, maintaining its commanding political position and capturing 58.2% of the popular vote. Saunders, contesting the South Caicos - North constituency, was re-elected with 84.2% of the vote. With this result, he became the first Chief Minister of the Turks and Caicos Islands to lead his party to back-to-back general election wins. As in the previous election, the PNP won every constituency in the Turks and Caicos Islands except for three of the four in Grand Turk: Grand Turk - West Road, Grand Turk - North Back Salina, and Grand Turk - South.

The PNP’s strong showing at the polls in 1984 was not only a reaffirmation of its leadership under Saunders, but also a reflection of the party’s focus on economic growth, national development, and expanding opportunities for Turks and Caicos Islanders. At the time, the territory remained reliant on British grant-in-aid to support public services and close budget deficits. In response, the Saunders-led government pursued a series of strategic reforms aimed at increasing national revenue and reducing external dependency. During its first term, the PNP implemented a number of impactful policies focused on strengthening government finances, promoting local entrepreneurship, and expanding the tourism sector.

One of the key legislative initiatives was the amendment of the Companies Law, intended to support the growth of an international financial services sector in the Turks and Caicos Islands. The government worked with legal experts and private firms to reform the law in ways that encouraged international company registrations, resulting in a significant and immediate increase in government revenue.

The PNP government also finalized negotiations with Club Med, one of the country’s earliest large-scale tourism projects. Saunders played a hands-on role in securing the deal, traveling to Paris, New York, and Miami as part of the approval process. With support from the British Government, a new airport on Providenciales was financed to accommodate tourism growth. The opening of Club Med Turkoise marked a turning point in the Turks and Caicos Islands’ tourism sector. When early labor unrest arose at the resort, Saunders personally intervened to mediate between management and workers, successfully restoring stability.

To ensure that the local population shared in the opportunities arising from the country’s growing economy, the PNP administration introduced the Business Licensing Law. As tourism development accelerated following the opening of Club Med, there was a surge in foreigners setting up businesses across a wide range of industries. This rapid expansion left little room for Turks and Caicos Islanders to benefit from the economic growth. In response, the law required all commercial operators to obtain licenses and established a Licensing Board to oversee the approval process. Specific categories of business were designated exclusively for Turks and Caicos Islanders, helping to protect local participation and encourage domestic entrepreneurship within the growing private sector.

Recognizing that many Turks and Caicos Islanders faced significant barriers in accessing financing, particularly as the economy began to grow, the PNP administration established a Development Board to address the issue. At the time, business loans were nearly impossible to obtain locally, and while financing was available through the Caribbean Development Bank (CDB), the approval process was often slow and cumbersome. The Development Board was created to fill this gap—it provided assistance with loan applications, monitored disbursements, and helped manage repayment. By offering hands-on support and expanding access to capital, the Development Board empowered local entrepreneurs to participate in the new economic opportunities emerging across the territory. Several major projects were launched with its backing, and the institution would go on to serve as a forerunner to TCInvest, which later became Invest Turks and Caicos.

These measures—targeting revenue generation, local empowerment, business growth, and tourism development—underpinned the PNP’s resounding victory in the 1984 Turks and Caicos Islands General Election and reinforced the party’s legacy during a formative period in the country’s modern political and economic development.

==== 2003 election ====
At the 2003 legislative elections, the party won six out of 13 seats. It won two extra seats at a by-election on 7 August 2003, bringing the party to power.

==== 2007 election ====
In the 9 February 2007 elections the party won 13 out of 15 seats, the largest margin in history until the 2021 general election.

==== 2016 election ====
Their 2016 election opponents were the People's Democratic Movement and the Progressive Democratic Alliance.

== Election results ==
Election	Leader	No. of votes	Share of votes	Seats	Result
1976	Norman Saunders	1,008	42.0%	4 / 11	Opposition
1980	Norman Saunders	1,724	60.3%	8 / 11	Government
1984	Norman Saunders	1,965	61.2%	8 / 11	Government
1988	Daniel Malcolm	2,727	29.6%	2 / 13	Opposition
1991	Washington Misick	4,834	40.8%	8 / 13	Government
1995	Washington Misick	1,887	45.8%	4 / 13	Opposition
1999	Washington Misick	1,849	40.8%	4 / 13	Opposition
2003	Michael Misick	2,725	49.8%	7 / 13	Government
2007	Michael Misick	3,609	60.8%	13 / 15	Government
2012	Rufus Ewing	2,833	44.8%	8 / 15	Government
2016	Rufus Ewing	2,645	42.7%	5 / 15	Opposition
2021	Washington Misick	3,572	55.2%	14 / 15	Government
2025	Washington Misick	3,958	58.56%	16 / 19	Government
