= Washington Misick =

Chief Minister of the Turks and Caicos Islands (born 1950)

The Honourable Charles Washington Misick OBE MHA
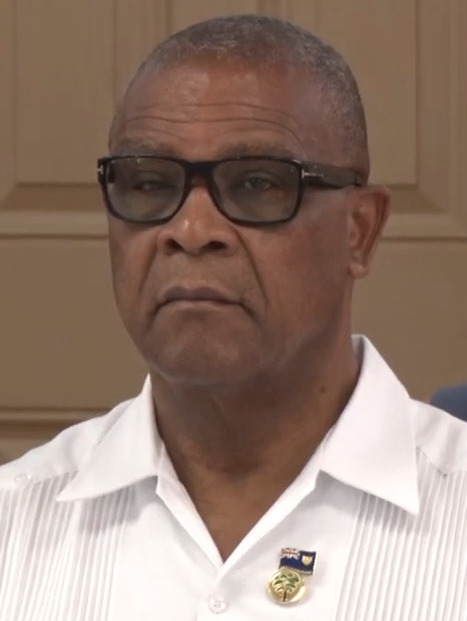
- Misick in 2022

5th Premier of the Turks and Caicos Islands
- Incumbent
- Assumed office 20 February 2021
- Monarchs: Elizabeth II; Charles III
- Governor: Nigel Dakin; Dileeni Daniel-Selvaratnam
- Deputy: E Jay Saunders; Jamell Robinson
- Preceded by: Sharlene Cartwright-Robinson

5th Chief Minister of the Turks and Caicos Islands
- In office 3 April 1991 – 31 January 1995
- Monarch: Elizabeth II
- Governor: Michael J. Bradley; Martin Bourke
- Preceded by: Oswald Skippings
- Succeeded by: Derek Hugh Taylor

Leader of the Progressive National Party
- Incumbent
- Assumed office 20 December 2016
- Deputy: Erwin Jay Saunders
- Preceded by: Rufus Ewing

Member of the House of Assembly for All Island District
- Incumbent
- Assumed office 12 November 2012 Serving with Erwin Jay Saunders; Josephine Connolly; Jamell Rayan Robionson; Shaun David Malcolm

Leader of the Opposition
- In office 20 December 2016 – 20 February 2021
- Premier: Sharlene Cartwright-Robinson
- Governor: John Freeman; Nigel Dakin
- Preceded by: Sharlene Cartwright-Robinson
- Succeeded by: Edwin Astwood

Personal details
- Born: Charles Washington Misick; 13 March 1950 (age 76) North Caicos, Turks and Caicos Islands
- Party: Progressive National Party
- Spouse: Delthia Misick
- Relations: Michael Misick (brother); Ariel Misick (brother)
- Education: Harvard University
- Nickname: Washy

Charles Washington Misick OBE (born 13 March 1950) is a Turks and Caicos Islander politician who has been the 5th Premier of the Turks and Caicos Islands since 20 February 2021. He has been the leader of the Progressive National Party since 20 December 2016. He previously served as the 5th Chief Minister of the Turks and Caicos Islands from 3 April 1991 to 31 January 1995, was Minister of Finance, Trade and Investment from 2012 to 2016 and Leader of the Opposition from 1995 to 2003 and again from 2016 to 2021. Misick has been a MHA for the All Island District since November 2012 and was previously an MHA for Grand Turk from 1991 to 1999.

Misick was educated at West Indies College and studied Business Studies and Business Administration & Accounting at the University of Technology.

== Early life ==
Misick was born on 13 March 1950 on North Caicos, where he grew up with his 12 siblings. He is the older brother of former Premier Michael Misick, and the uncle of former Minister of Immigration Donhue Gardiner.

== 2021 general elections ==
=== Leaving politics ===
Since becoming the Leader of the Opposition in 2016, Misick was assuring everyone that he would be leaving politics after his term had come to an end. Thus, it was a surprise to all when he, in early 2019, stood for re-election within the party as its leader for the election to be called. Misick won said election and remained leader as the party geared up for what was expected to be the 2020 general elections. He still told of his readiness to exit politics in a "two minute speech" in the House of Assembly on 4 March 2019, stating:

"Over the past two years, I have been saying that I am done with this and I am leaving, but there comes a time for every man and nation to make a decision... I think I have a legacy that is not all bad and I believe it behoves me in a time like this to stand up, be counted and continue to contribute to these Islands even at my own detriment, my own personal economic loss."

=== Landslide victory ===
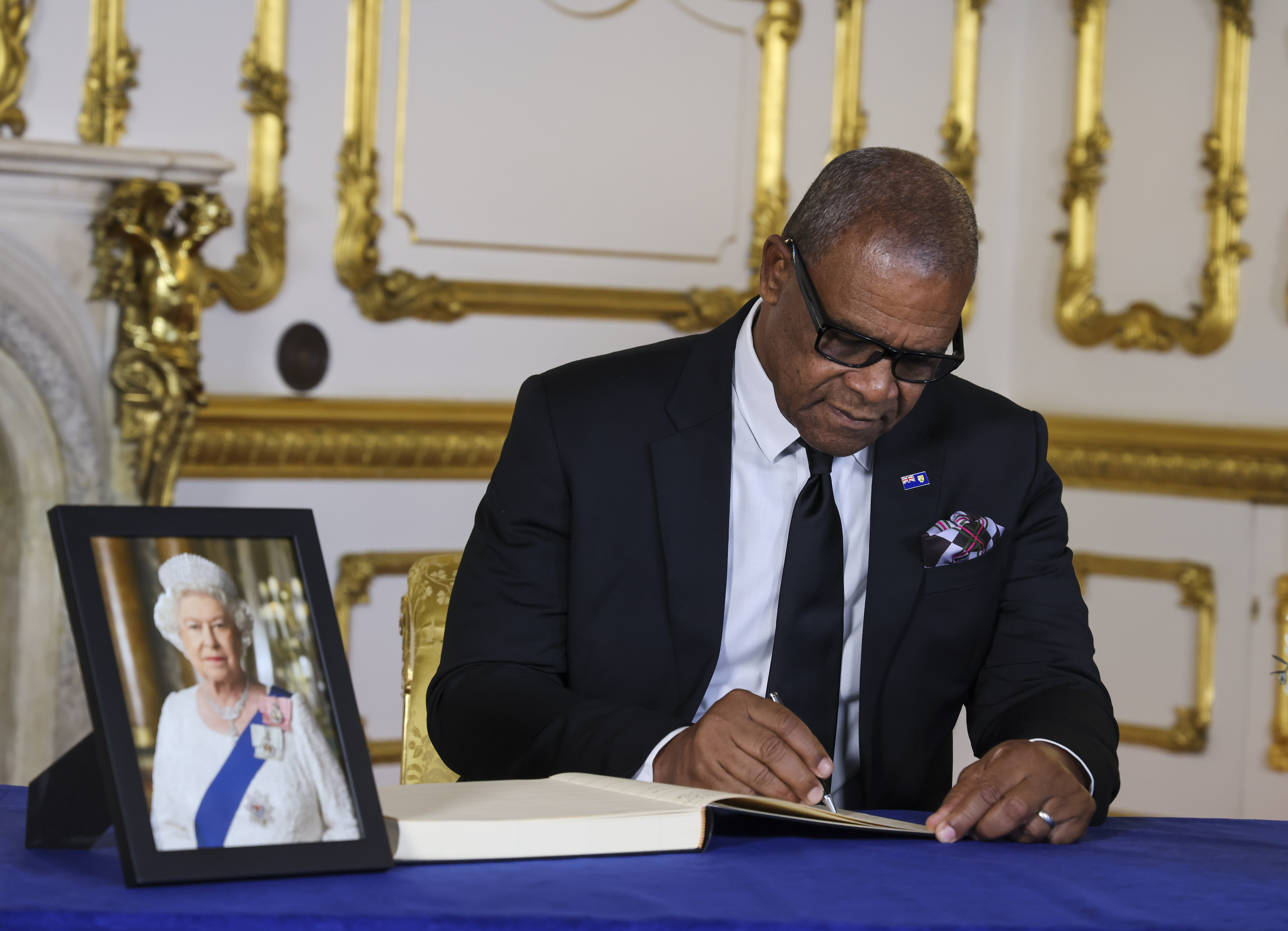
Misick signing the book of condolence for Queen Elizabeth II at Lancaster House on 17 September 2022

The PNP's "All Aboard Ship PNP" campaign quickly gained momentum as they began campaigning for their 15 candidates well before the opposing party had even chosen its 15 candidates.

This would prove to pay off, as the PNP went on to win 14 of the 15 electoral districts in the 2021 general elections. The only seat not won has historically always gone to the PDM.

Upon being sworn in, Misick (70) is the second oldest to lead the nation, with the oldest being Nathaniel Francis who was 73 years old when he was sworn in as Chief Minister in 1985.

== Personal life ==
Misick was born in Bottle Creek, North Caicos, to Charles and Jane Misick. He is married to Delthia Misick. He has numerous siblings, one being his younger brother, Michael Misick.

His employment history includes a senior audit position with PriceWaterhouse-Coopers, chairman and CEO of the Prestigious Group - Real Estate Sales and Development. In the past, he held the portfolio of Tourism and Finance.

Misick has attended and presented at many conferences in the Caribbean, Canada, the United States, and Asia on topics ranging from financial services to investment opportunities and tourism.

He is a member of the Seventh-day Adventist Church.

In the 2000 New Year Honours, Misick was appointed Officer of the Order of the British Empire (OBE) for community service.

Political offices
Preceded by Oswald Skippings	Chief Minister of the Turks and Caicos Islands; 1991–1995	Succeeded by Derek Hugh Taylor
Preceded by Sharlene Cartwright-Robinson	Premier of the Turks and Caicos Islands; 2021–present	Incumbent
