= Parliament of the Turks and Caicos Islands =

Type
- Type: Unicameral

Leadership
- Speaker: Gordon Burton, PNP since 5 March 2021
- Premier: Washington Misick, PNP
- Leader of the Opposition: Edwin Astwood, PDM

Structure
- Seats: 21; 19 elected members 2 ex officio
- Political groups: Government (16): PNP (16); Opposition (3): PDM (2); Independent (1); Others (2): Ex officio (2)

Elections
- Last election: 7 February 2025
- Next election: 2030

Meeting place
- Cockburn Town, Turks and Caicos Islands

Website
- gov.tc/hoa/

The Parliament of the Turks and Caicos Islands is the legislature of the British Overseas Territory of the Turks and Caicos Islands. The name of the house was changed from the Legislative Council of the Turks and Caicos Islands to House of Assembly of the Turks and Caicos Islands following the implementation of the new constitution on 9 August 2006. The current name was adopted on 10 December 2024.

In August 2009, the United Kingdom suspended the Turks and Caicos' self-government after allegations of ministerial corruption. The prerogative of the ministerial government and the House of Assembly were vested in the islands' governor until a general election was held in November 2012.

== Composition ==
The Parliament has 21 members in total. Formerly, 15 members were elected for a four-year term in single-seat constituencies (of which 11 lay in the Caicos Islands and 4 in the Turks Islands), while 3 members sat ex officio, 3 were appointed members and a speaker was chosen from outside the house.

Although the number of elected representatives to the body was not changed during the 2009-12 suspension of self-government, the composition was changed so that ten of the 15 elected representatives are elected to individual districts, while five are now elected at-large.

Starting with the 2025 elections, the composition of the newly renamed Parliament was changed so that the four formerly appointed members were also elected at-large, thus increasing the at-large constituency to nine members.

== Consultative Forum (2009–2012) ==
Following the suspension of self-government in August 2009, the Governor assembled a Consultative Forum for the Turks and Caicos Islands to advise him on legislation relating to the territory. The forum consisted of the Chief Executive, the Attorney-General, the Permanent Secretary for Finance, and eleven to fifteen representatives of the community, appointed by the Governor. The council could make non-binding recommendations to the Governor about bills that were presented to it and on policies that were referred to it. The chair of the Consultative Forum was Lillian Missick. The forum disbanded in November 2012 upon the election of a new House of Assembly following restoration of self-government to the islands.

== Election results ==
General election results, 2025

Party	District			At-large			Total seats	+/–
Party	Votes	%	Seats	Votes	%	Seats	Total seats	+/–
Progressive National Party	3,958	58.56	7	35,560	60.17	9	16	+2
People's Democratic Movement	2,578	38.14	2	22,794	38.57	0	2	+1
Progressive Democratic Alliance				183	0.31	0	0	0
Independents	223	3.30	1	558	0.94	0	1	+1
Ex officio members							2	0
Nominated members							0	–4
Total	6,759	100.00	10	59,095	100.00	9	21	6759
Valid votes	6,759	100.00						
Invalid/blank votes	0	0.00						
Total votes	6,759	100.00						
Registered voters/turnout	9,385	72.02						
Source: Turks & Caicos Islands Government

== See also ==
- Speaker of the House of Assembly (Turks and Caicos Islands)
