= List of Indigenous names of Caribbean islands =

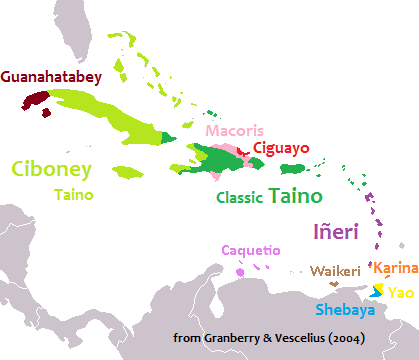
Map of the Indigenous languages of the Caribbean in 1492

This list is a compilation of the Indigenous names that were given by Amerindian people to the Caribbean islands before the Europeans started naming them. The islands of the Caribbean were successively settled since at least around 5000 BC, long before European arrival in 1492. The Caribbean islands were dominated by two main cultural groups by the European contact period: the Taíno and the Kalinago. Individual villages of other distinct cultural groups were also present on the larger islands. The island of Trinidad in particular was shared by both Kalinago and Arawakan-speaking groups.

Current evidence suggests there were two major migrations to the Caribbean. The first migration was of pre-Arawakan people like the Ciguayo who most likely migrated from Central America. The second major migration was Arawakan-speaking people settling the islands as they traveled north from the Orinoco River in Venezuela. The Kalinago people, who were more dominant in warfare, began a campaign of conquering and displacement of the earlier Arawakan-speaking people at the point of European arrival. Starting at the southern end of the archipelago, they had worked their way north, reaching as far as the island of Saint Kitts by the 16th century.

The islands north of the Saint Kitts 'borderline' had Arawakan names while the islands south of it had Kalinago names. The island of Barbados was uninhabited at the point of European arrival, but evidence suggests that Barbados followed the same pattern of displacement as witnessed on neighbouring islands, but that it was abandoned for unknown reasons. The only Indigenous name on record for Barbados is one documented as the name used by Arawakan-speaking peoples on Trinidad in reference to that island.

== Leeward Islands ==
Present Name	Indigenous Name	Origin	Meaning
Anguilla	Malliouhana	Arawakan	Arrow-Shaped Sea Serpent
St. Martin	Soualiga Oualichi	Arawakan	Land of Salt; Land of Beautiful women
St. Barths	Ouanalao	Arawakan	Toad on Top
Saba	Siba Amonhana	Arawakan	The Rock
St. Eustatius	Aloi	Arawakan	Cashew Tree
Vieques	Bieke	Taíno	Small Island
Saint Croix	Ay Ay	Taíno	The River
Saint Croix	Cibuguiera	Kalinago	Stoney Land
Saint Kitts	Liamuiga	Kalinago	Fertile Land
Nevis	Oualie	Kalinago	Land of Beautiful Water
Montserrat	Alliouagana	Kalinago	Land of Prickly Bush
Barbuda	Wa'omoni	Kalinago	Land of the herons (broader interpretation: Land of the large birds)
Antigua	Waladli	Kalinago	Land of Fish Oil
Antigua	Yarumaqui	Arawakan	Yarumo Island
Redonda	Ocananmanrou	Kalinago	Unknown
Guadeloupe	Karukera	Kalinago	Island of Gumtrees
Marie Galante	Aichi Touloukaera Aulinagan	Kalinago Arawakan Arawakan	Land of chili peppers; Land of touloulou crabs; Land of cotton
Source: Dick, Kenneth C. (1977). "Aboriginal and Early Spanish Names of Some Caribbean, Circum-Caribbean Islands and Cays". Journal of the Virgin Islands Archaeological Society. 4: 17–41.

== Windward Islands ==
Present Name	Indigenous Name	Origin	Meaning
Dominica	Wai'tukubuli Kairi	Kalinago Arawak	Tall is Her Body Island
Martinique	Jouanacaeira	Kalinago	Land of Iguana
St. Lucia	Hewanorra	Kalinago	Land of the Iguana
Saint Vincent	Hairouna	Kalinago	Land of the Blessed
Bequia	Becouya	Kalinago	Island of the Clouds
Canouan	Cannouan	Kalinago	Island of Turtles
Carriacou	Kayryouacou	Kalinago	Island of Reefs
Grenada	Camerhogne	Kalinago / Galibi?	Land of abundance
Source: Dick, Kenneth C. (1977). "Aboriginal and Early Spanish Names of Some Caribbean, Circum-Caribbean Islands and Cays". Journal of the Virgin Islands Archaeological Society. 4: 17–41.

== Continental ==
Present Name	Indigenous Name	Origin	Meaning
Barbados	Ichirouganaim	Arawakan	Red land/island with white teeth (reefs)
Tobago	Tobago	Kalinago / Galibi?	Tobacco Pipe
Trinidad	Kairi Iere	Kalinago	Land of the Hummingbird
Source: Dick, Kenneth C. (1977). "Aboriginal and Early Spanish Names of Some Caribbean, Circum-Caribbean Islands and Cays". Journal of the Virgin Islands Archaeological Society. 4: 17–41.

== Greater Antilles ==
Present Name	Indigenous Name	Origin	Meaning
Hispaniola	Bohío	Taíno	Land of gold
Hispaniola	Babeque	Taíno	Land of gold
Hispaniola	Haití	Taíno	Land of high mountains
Hispaniola	Quisqueya	Ciguayo (*Orgin debated, likely not native)	Mother of the lands
Cuba	Kuba	Taíno	Large island or place of abundance
Puerto Rico	Borikén Boriquén Borinquen	Taíno	Land of the Valiant and Noble Lord
Jamaica	Xaymaca	Taíno	Land of Wood and Water or Land of Springs
Source: Dick, Kenneth C. (1977). "Aboriginal and Early Spanish Names of Some Caribbean, Circum-Caribbean Islands and Cays". Journal of the Virgin Islands Archaeological Society. 4: 17–41.

== Lucayan Archipelago ==
Julian Granberry and Gary Vescelius suggest the following Lucayan (Taíno) etymologies for various Lucayan islands.

Present name	Indigenous name	Indigenous form	Origin	Meaning
Inagua	Inagua	i+na+wa	Lucayan	Small Eastern Land
Inagua	Baneque	ba+ne+ke	Lucayan	Big Water Island
Little Inagua	Guanahaní	wa+na+ha+ni	Lucayan	Small Upper Waters Land
Ragged Island	Utiaquia	huti+ya+kaya	Lucayan	Western Hutia Island
Crooked/Jumento	Jume(n)to	ha+wo+ma+te	Lucayan	Upper Land of the Middle Distance
Exuma	Curateo	ko+ra+te+wo	Lucayan	Outer Far Distant Land
Exuma	Guaratía	wa+ra+te+ya	Lucayan	Far Distant Land
Turks Bank	Babueca	ba+we+ka	Lucayan	Large Northern Basin
Big Sand Cay	Cacina	ka+si+na	Lucayan	Little Northern Sand
Salt Cay	Canamani	ka+na+ma+ni	Lucayan	Small Northern Mid-Waters
Salt Cay	Cacumani	ka+ko+ma+ni	Lucayan	Mid-Waters Northern Outlier
Cotton Cay	Macareque	Ma+ka+ri+ke	Lucayan	Middle Northern Land
Grand Turk	Amuana	aba+wa+na	Lucayan	First Small Land
South Caicos	Caciba	ka+siba	Lucayan	Northern Rocky
East Caicos	Guana	wa+na	Lucayan	Small Country
Middle Caicos	Aniana	a+ni+ya+na	Lucayan	Small Far Waters
North Caicos	Caicos	ka+i+ko	Lucayan	Nearby Northern Outlier
Pine Cay	Buiana	bu+ya+na	Lucayan	Small Western Home
Pine Cays	Boniana	bo+ni+ya+na	Lucayan	Small Western Waters Home
Providenciales	Yucanacan	yuka+na+ka	Lucayan	The Peoples Small Northern [Land]
Providenciales	Ianicana	ya+ni+ka+na	Lucayan	Far Waters Smaller [Land]
West Caicos	Macubiza	ma+ko+bi+sa	Lucayan	Mid Unsettled Outlier
Mayaguana	Mayaguana	ma+ya+wa+na	Lucayan	Lesser Midwestern Land
Plana Cays	Amaguayo	a+ma+wa+yo	Lucayan	Toward the Middle Lands
Acklins Island	Yabaque	ya+ba+ke	Lucayan	Large Western Land
Samana	Samana	sa+ma+na	Lucayan	Small Middle Forest
Long Island	Yuma	yu+ma	Lucayan	Higher Middle
Rum Cay	Manigua	ma+ni+wa	Lucayan	Mid Waters Land
San Salvador Island	Guanahaní	wa+na+ha+ni	Lucayan	Small Upper Waters Land
Little San Salvador Island	Guateo	wa+te+yo	Lucayan	Toward the Distant Land
Cat Island	Guanima	wa+ni+ma	Lucayan	Middle Waters Land
Great Guana Cay	Ayrabo	ay+ra+bo	Lucayan	Far Distant Home
New Providence	Nema	ne+ma	Lucayan	Middle Waters
Eleuthera	Ciguateo	siba+te+wo	Lucayan	Distant Rocky Place
Great Abaco	Lucayoneque	luka+ya+ne+ke	Lucayan	The People's Distant Waters Land
Grand Bahama	Bahama	ba+ha+ma	Lucayan	Large Upper Middle [Land]
Andros	Habacoa	ha+ba+ko+wa	Lucayan	Large Upper Outlier Land
Williams Island	Canimisi	ka+ni+misi	Lucayan	Northern Waters Swamp
Bimini	Bimini	bi+mi+ni	Lucayan	The Twins

== See also ==
- Guianas
