= List of islands of Turks and Caicos =

List of Caribbean islands of the Turks and Caicos Islands

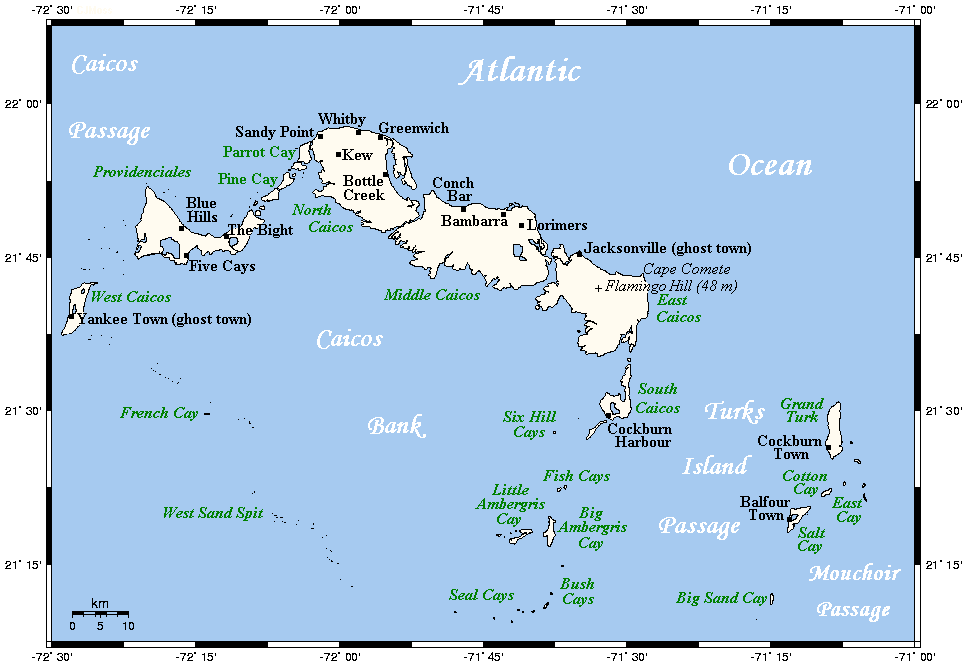
Turks and Caicos Islands

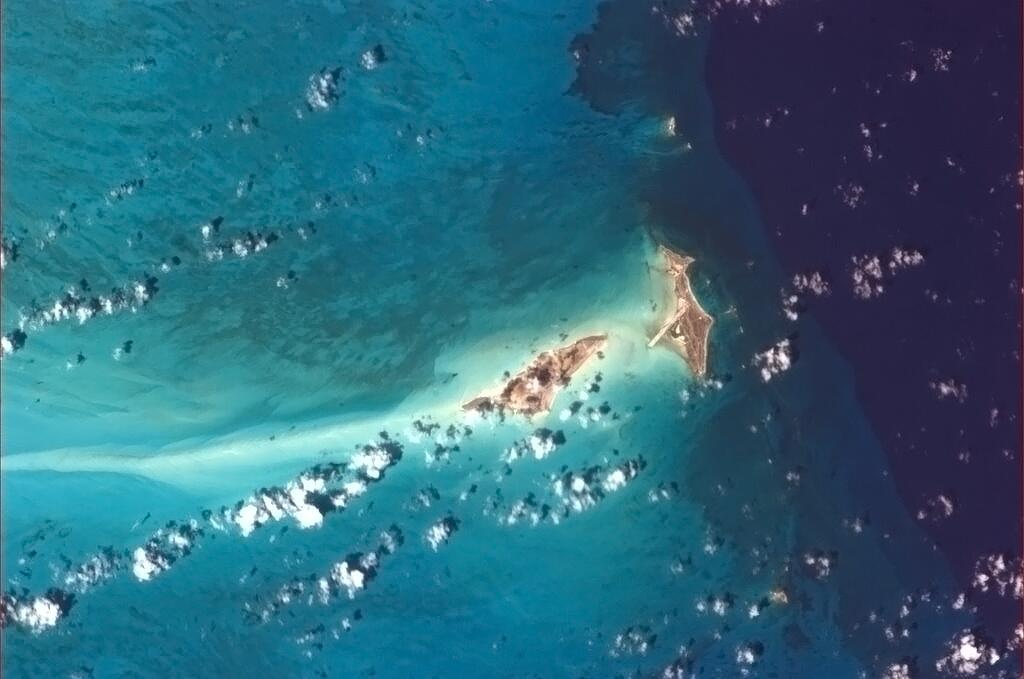
Big and Little Ambergris Cay

This is a list of islands of the Turks and Caicos Islands. There are about 75 islands and land-tied islands in the Turks and Caicos Islands, including the following islands:

- Bay Cay
- Belle Isle
- Big Ambergris Cay, 21°18′09″N 71°37′57″W
- Big Cameron Cay
- Big Sand Cay
- Bird Island (Pear Cay), 21°22′22″N 71°05′22″W
- Blue Hills Island
- Booby Island
- Breeches Island
- Bush Cay
- Conch Cay
- Cotton Cay
- Dellis Cay
- Dikish Cay
- Donna Cay
- East Caicos, 21°41′04″N 71°30′28″W
- East Cay
- Fish Cays
- Five Cays
- Fort George Cay
- French Cay
- Gibbs Cay
- Grand Turk, 21°28′07″N 71°08′21″W
- Highas Cay
- Hog Cay
- Iguana Cay
- Joe Grants Cay
- Little Ambergris Cay, 21°17′49″N 71°41′38″W
- Little Water Cay
- Long Cay
- Major Hill Cay
- Mangrove Cay, 21°49′27″N 72°08′30″W
- Middle Caicos, 21°47′51″N 71°43′40″W
- Middle Creek Cay
- Middleton Cay
- North Caicos, 21°54′18″N 71°57′19″W
- Parrot Cay, 21°55′10″N 72°03′34″W
- Pear Cay, 21°11′00″N 71°41′00″W
- Pelican Cay
- Penniston Cay
- Pine Cay
- Plandon Cay
- Providenciales Island, 21°46′50″N 72°14′44″W
- Sail Rock Island
- Salt Cay, 21°19′36″N 71°12′22″W
- Sand Cay
- Seal Cays
- Shot Cay
- Six Hill Cays
- South Caicos, 21°30′28″N 71°31′14″W
- Stubb Cay
- The Island
- Three Mary Cays
- Water Cay
- West Caicos, 21°40′17″N 72°27′22″W
- West Sand Spit Island
- White Cay

== See also ==
- List of Caribbean islands
