= Royal Turks and Caicos Islands Police Force =

- Flag of the Turks and Caicos Islands
- Abbreviation: RTCIPF

Agency overview
- Formed: 1799

Jurisdictional structure
- National agency: British Overseas Territories
- Operations jurisdiction: Turks and Caicos Islands, British Overseas Territories
- Location of Royal Turks and Caicos Islands Police Force (circled in red)
- Area: 238 miles²
- Population: Approx 32,000
- General nature: Local civilian police

Operational structure
- Headquarters: Grand Turk Island
- Constables: 225 full-time (plus special constables)
- Agency executive: Trevor Botting, Commissioner

Facilities
- Stations: 11 (9 community, 1 airport, 1 marine)

Website
- www.tcipolice.tc

The Royal Turks and Caicos Islands Police Force (RTCIPF) is the national police force of the Turks and Caicos Islands, a British Overseas Territory in the Lucayan Archipelago of the Atlantic Ocean and northern West Indies. It is one of the oldest police forces in the world.

== History ==
The RTCIPF was formed in 1799, when John Dunmore was appointed 'High Constable', with three 'Special Constables' appointed to assist him in maintaining law and order throughout the island group. They were named the Royal Turks and Caicos Islands Police Force, and have operated ever since.

As the RTCIPF polices a British territory, but is also geographically closer to the United States (US), it is influenced by both in style and practice. Examples include traditional United Kingdom (UK) type uniforms and rank designations (from Constable to Commissioner), and the use of US type police vehicles, such as the Ford Police Interceptor Utility.

== Structure ==
The force is headed by a Commissioner of Police, and is divided into two operational divisions:

- A Division – the islands of Grand Turk, South Caicos, and Salt Cay (3 police stations, plus the airport police post)
- B Division – the islands of Providenciales and North Caicos (6 police stations)

=== Leadership ===
- The force is headed by a Commissioner, supported by a Deputy Commissioner.
- Each Division is headed by an Assistant Commissioner.
- A Superintendent is in command of each individual police station.
- There is also a small Tourist Police Unit reporting directly to the Deputy Commissioner.
- The head of criminal investigation holds the rank of Detective Superintendent.

=== Specialist Units ===
There are several specialist operational units, including a financial crime unit. There is a marine unit, equipped with inshore and ocean-going patrol vessels.

There is also a tactical unit equipped with former PSNI armoured Land Rover Tangis. The tactical unit is commanded by a Chief Superintendent.

=== Support ===
As a British Overseas Territory, at times of crisis the RTCIPF receives assistance from other agencies, such as the British Armed Forces. This happened in the 2020 coronavirus pandemic, when the Standing Joint Force Headquarters Group (a tri-service support group of sailors, marines, soldiers, and airmen who support governments during crises) deployed to assist the police and TCI government.

== Staffing ==
The Royal Turks and Caicos Islands Police Force has 225 full-time sworn police officers. In addition to this number, there are volunteer special constables, and also civilian (non-sworn) police support staff.

== Rank Structure ==
The RTCIPF has a rank structure, that is similar to other British police forces.

RTCIPF rank structure
Rank	Commissioner	Deputy Commissioner	Assistant Commissioner	Acting Assistant Commissioner	Superintendent	Assistant Superintendent	Inspector	Sergeant	Constable
Epaulette insignia									

== Uniform ==
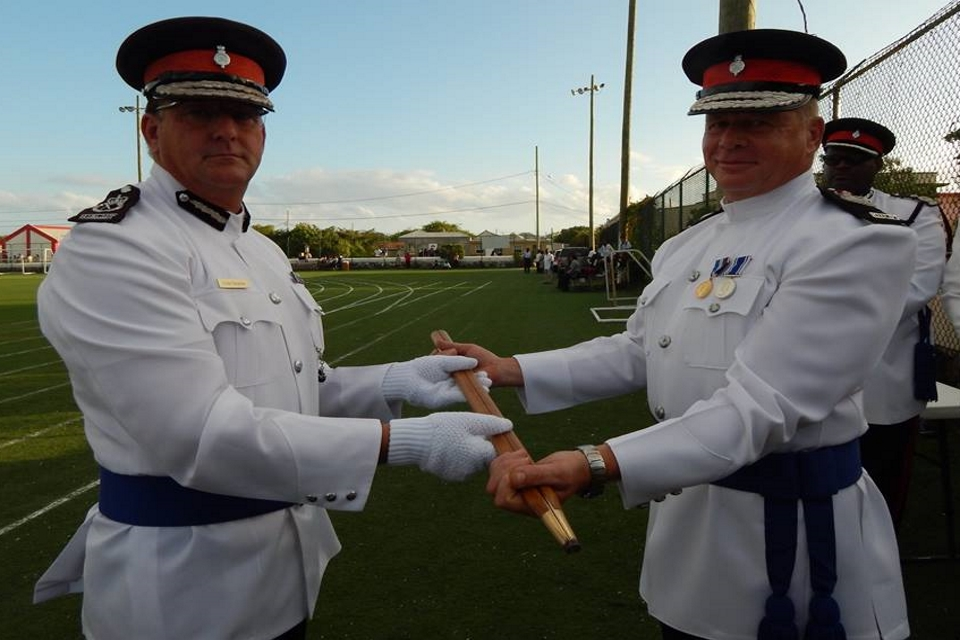
Commissioners in "Whites"

The RTCIPF is a uniformed police force, with several orders of dress for different duties. The uniform and rank structure mirrors other British territories and United Kingdom forces in its look and approach. All officers, below the rank of Inspector, wear a unique identification number (known as a "Collar Number" after British early policeman wearing them on collars of uniforms) on all of their uniforms.

=== Formal dress ===
The RTCIPF have many uniforms for different duties. As one of the world's oldest police forces, with strong historical links to British military and police forces, their uniform traditions are thus heavily influenced by British uniforms. Comparisons are made below.

'Whites'

The most formal order of dress for police officers is (in British Army use - No. 3 dress) the warm weather ceremonial uniform ('whites'), which consists of:

Males

- White bush jacket or tunic with high collar and silver buttons and whistle on a chain
- Black trousers with double red stripe
- Black peaked cap with red cap-band and police capbadge
- White gloves (senior officers)
- Blue waist sash (senior officers)
- Black polished belt with metal clasp
- Polished black shoes or boots

Females

- White bush jacket/tunic worn open at collar with tie and white shirt worn underneath, silver buttons and whistle on chain
- Black trousers with double red stripe or black skirt with double red stripe and stockings
- Black tall female cap with red cap-band and police capbadge
- White gloves (senior officers)
- Blue waist sash (senior officers)
- Black polished belt with metal clasp
- Polished black shoes or boots

On the epaulette of the tunic, "RTCIPF" letters are worn to denote police. Rank for Sergeants is worn on the upper sleeve area and on the epaulettes for senior officers (inspectors and above).

The staple item of a British police officer; the whistle on a chain, is worn and held between buttons and top pocket. Medals (if any) are worn on the left breast.

On parade with weapons (most formal occasions), junior ranks carry rifles and more senior officers may carry swords or swagger sticks.

'Blues'

The alternate (and one level down) formal uniform is the dark blue service dress (in British Army use - No. 2 dress) which is similar to 'whites', except:

- the white tunic is replaced by a dark blue tunic, worn open at the collar for males and females of all ranks, with a collar and tie underneath
- Sam Browne belts are worn over the top (for all ranks)
- whistles on chains are not worn however, but black lanyards are worn on the left shoulder
- white gloves for junior ranks and black leather gloves for officers
- black swagger sticks for senior officers are carried underneath the left arm
- Same headdress as for "whites" dress.

=== Day dress (undress) ===
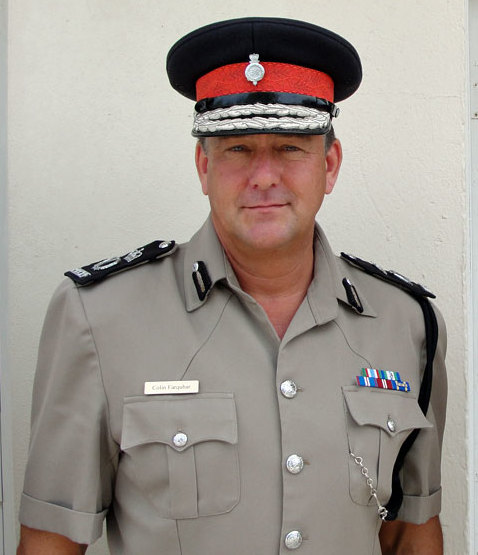
Former Commissioner Farquhar in undress uniform

For everyday policing, the undress variants of the above are worn. This is the police version of the Army's No. 6 (warm weather bush jacket) uniform consisting of:

- Stone coloured bush jacket
- Stone coloured trousers
- Black shoes or boots
- Same headdress as above uniforms
- Black lanyard worn on the left
- Rank worn as above
- Medal ribbons to be worn on the left breast.

This is generally worn for non-physical work (such as meetings, indoor work), but not for more practical work nor more formal parades.

=== Everyday dress ===
This uniform is for everyday police work, such as patrolling and investigating. It consists of:

- White, grey or light blue short-sleeve shirt with insignia
- Black trousers with red piping
- Same headdress as above uniforms
- Black shoes/boots

Equipment is worn on waist belts and rank is worn in the same way as above. High visibility vests are worn for traffic-related work.

=== Operational dress/Fatigues ===
This uniform is for police work that is physically demanding and needs a less smart, simpler approach, such as firearms work. It consists of:

- Black polo shirt or t-shirt
- Black trousers
- Boots
- Baseball cap

Insignia is minimal, but "POLICE" in large letters is worn on the back of the shirt. Equipment is carried on the waist.

== Equipment and Vehicles ==
The RTCIPF uses typical police equipment, such as motor vehicles, radios and arrest equipment.

=== Firearms ===
Some RTCIPF officers carry firearms. This is less usual in most UK and British Overseas Territories police services/forces, but in some territories it is more common practice.

=== Vehicles ===
Because of its proximity to the US, the RTCIPF uses more US-style police vehicles, such as the Ford Police Interceptor Utility, these vehicles are marked, have red & blue flashing lights, the 911 emergency number and the police motto. The tactical and marine units (see above) use armoured vehicles and boats respectively.

== See also ==
- Turks and Caicos Islands Regiment
