= Middle Caicos Airport =

- IATA: MDS; ICAO: MBMC

Summary
- Airport type: Public
- Serves: Middle Caicos, Turks and Caicos Islands
- Elevation AMSL: 9 ft / 3 m
- Coordinates: 21°49′33″N 071°48′09″W

Map
- Location in Middle Caicos

Runways
Direction	Length		Surface
Direction	m	ft	Surface
12/30	750	2,461	Paved

Middle Caicos Airport (IATA: MDS, ICAO: MBMC) is an airport serving Middle Caicos (also known as Grand Caicos), the largest island in the Turks and Caicos Islands.

== Facilities ==
The airport is at an elevation of 9 ft (3 m) above mean sea level. It has one runway which is 750 m × 30 m (2,461 ft × 98 ft).
