= RGHS =

RGHS may refer to:

- Raymond Gardiner High School, North Caicos, Turks and Caicos Islands (United Kingdom)
- Randwick Girls' High School, Randwick, New South Wales, Australia
- Rangamati Government High School, Rangamati, Bangladesh
- Rochester Regional Health (Formerly Rochester General Health System) in Rochester, New York, United States
- Rotorua Girls' High School, Rotorua, New Zealand
