= Marjorie Basden High School =

School in Turks and Caicos

Coordinates: 21.5034°N 71.5295°W

Marjorie Basden High School is a secondary school in South Caicos, Turks and Caicos.

It was previously named Pierson High School and received its current name in 1990, after Marjorie Lightbourne-Basden, a former teacher who retired in 1980. Rodney Cox became the principal in 2018; Cox began working for the school circa 1992 as a teacher and rose through the ranks.
