= Pine Cay =

Island in the Turks and Caicos Islands

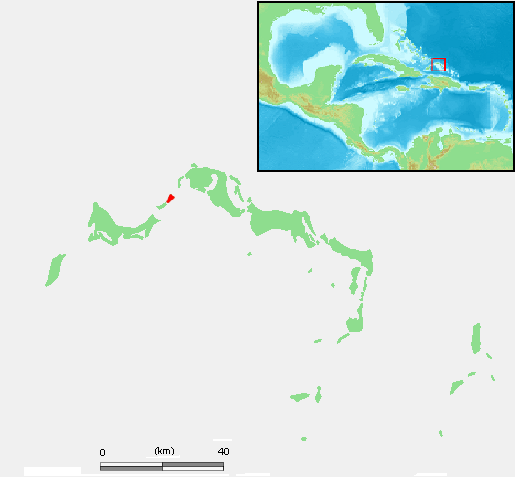
- Location of Pine Cay within the Turks and Caicos Islands

- Location within Turks and Caicos Islands Location within the Caribbean

Geography
- Location: Atlantic Ocean
- Coordinates: 21°52′16.30″N 72°05′36.73″W
- Archipelago: Lucayan Archipelago

Administration
- United Kingdom
- British Overseas Territory: Turks and Caicos Islands

Additional information
- Time zone: EST (UTC-5)
  - Summer (DST): EDT (UTC-4)
- ISO code: TC

Pine Cay is an 800-acre (3.2 km^{2}) privately owned island occupied by 38 homeowners and a small exclusive resort called Pine Cay in the Turks and Caicos Islands. Pine Cay resort consists of 13 beachfront hotel rooms, a restaurant, clubhouse and bar. There is also a small spa.

Pine Cay was the site of the first tourist development on the Turks and Caicos. It was planned in the 1950s. The old Meridian Club now called Pine Cay was established in the early 1970s.

Pine Cay is less than a mile wide and two miles (3 km) long, though 9 miles (14 km) of trails thread the island. Island transportation is by electric golf cart and bicycle. The main beach is 2 miles (3.2 km) long. There is a paved airstrip that accommodates small private aircraft and helicopters.

Pine Cay is also near Dellis Cay and Fort George's Cay.
