= Turks and Caicos Islands =

British Overseas Territory in the North Atlantic Ocean

- British Overseas Territory
- Flag Coat of arms
- National song: "This Land of Ours"
- Location of Turks and Caicos Islands (circled in red)
- Sovereignty: United Kingdom
- Treaty of Paris: 3 September 1783
- Federation: 3 January 1958
- Separate colony: 31 May 1962
- Capital: Grand Turk (Cockburn Town)
- Largest city: Providenciales
- Official languages: English
- Ethnic groups: 88% Afro-Caribbean; 8% Euro-Caribbean; 4% mixed or Indo-Caribbeans
- Demonym(s): Turks and Caicos Islander, Turks Islander, Caicos Islander
- Government: Dependency under constitutional monarchy
  - Monarch: Charles III
  - Governor: Dileeni Daniel-Selvaratnam
  - Deputy Governor: Anya Williams
  - Premier: Washington Misick
- Legislature: Parliament

Government of the United Kingdom
  - Minister: Uma Kumaran

Area
  - Total: 948 km^{2} (366 sq mi)
  - Water (%): negligible
- Highest elevation: 48 m (157 ft)

Population
  - 2025 estimate: ▲52,299
  - 2012 census: 31,458
  - Density: 121.7/sq mi (47.0/km^{2})
- GDP (nominal): 2024 estimate
  - Total: US$1.745 billion
  - Per capita: US$34,331
- Currency: United States dollar (US$) (USD)
- Time zone: UTC−05:00 (EST)
  - Summer (DST): UTC−04:00 (EDT)
- Date format: dd/mm/yyyy
- Driving side: Left
- Calling code: +1
- UK postcode: TKCA 1ZZ
- ISO 3166 code: TC
- Internet TLD: .tc
- Website: gov.tc

Turks and Caicos Islands (/ˈtɜːrks/ and /ˈkeɪkəs, -koʊs, -kɒs/) is a British Overseas Territory consisting of the larger Caicos Islands and smaller Turks Islands, two groups of tropical islands in the Lucayan Archipelago of the Atlantic Ocean and northern West Indies. They are known primarily for tourism and as an offshore financial centre. In 2025, the estimate population by the Statistics Authority was 52,299, making it the third-largest of the British overseas territories by population.

The islands are southeast of Mayaguana in the Bahamas island chain and north of the island of Hispaniola (Haiti and the Dominican Republic). Cockburn Town, the capital since 1766, is situated on Grand Turk about 1,042 kilometres (647 mi) east-southeast of Miami. They have a total land area of 430 square kilometres (170 sq mi). (Note: Alternative sources give different figures for the area of the Islands. The CIA World Factbook gives 430 km^{2} (170 sq mi), the European Union says 417 km^{2} (161 sq mi), and the Encyclopædia Britannica says, "Area at high tide, 238 square miles (616 square km); at low tide, 366 square miles (948 square km)". A report by the Turks and Caicos Islands Department of Economic Planning and Statistics gives the same numbers as the Encyclopædia Britannica though its definitions are less clear.)

The islands were inhabited for centuries by Lucayan people (Taíno). The first recorded European sighting of them was in 1512. In subsequent centuries, they were claimed by several European powers, with the British Empire eventually gaining control. For many years they were governed indirectly through Bermuda, the Bahamas, and Jamaica. When the Bahamas gained independence in 1973, the islands received their own governor, and have remained an autonomous territory since.

== Etymology ==
The name Caico[s] is from the Lucayan caya hico, meaning 'string of islands'. The Turks Islands are named after the Turk's cap cactus, Melocactus intortus, whose red cephalium resembles the fez hat worn by Turks in the late Ottoman Empire.

== History ==
=== Precolonial era ===
The first inhabitants of the islands were Arawakan-speaking Indigenous people, who most likely crossed over from Hispaniola some time from AD 500 to 800. Together with Taíno who migrated from Cuba to the southern Bahamas around the same time, these people developed as the Lucayan. According to Julian Granberry and Gary Vescelius, around 1200 CE, the Turks and Caicos Islands were resettled by Classical Taínos from Hispaniola.

=== European arrival ===
It is unknown precisely who the first European to sight the islands was. Some sources state that the explorer Christopher Columbus saw the islands on his voyage to the Americas in 1492. However, other sources state that it is more likely that Spanish conquistador Juan Ponce de León was the first European in Turks and Caicos, in 1512. In either case, by 1512 the Spanish had begun capturing the Taíno and Lucayans as labourers in the encomienda system to replace the largely depleted native population of Hispaniola. As a result of this, and the introduction of diseases to which the native people had no immunity, the southern Bahama Islands and the Turks and Caicos Islands were completely depopulated by about 1513, and remained so until the 17th century.

=== European settlement ===
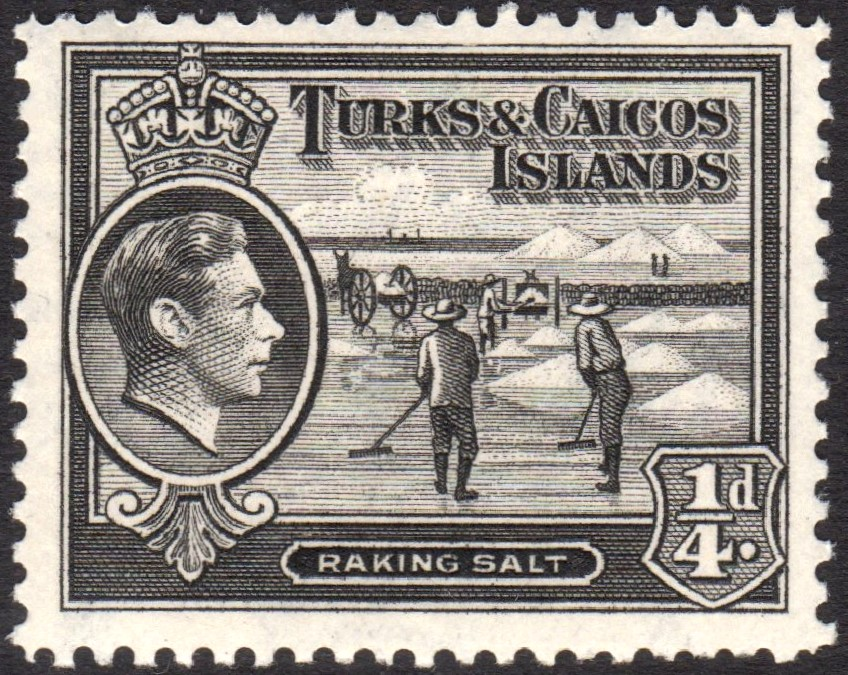
Raking salt on a 1938 postage stamp of the islands

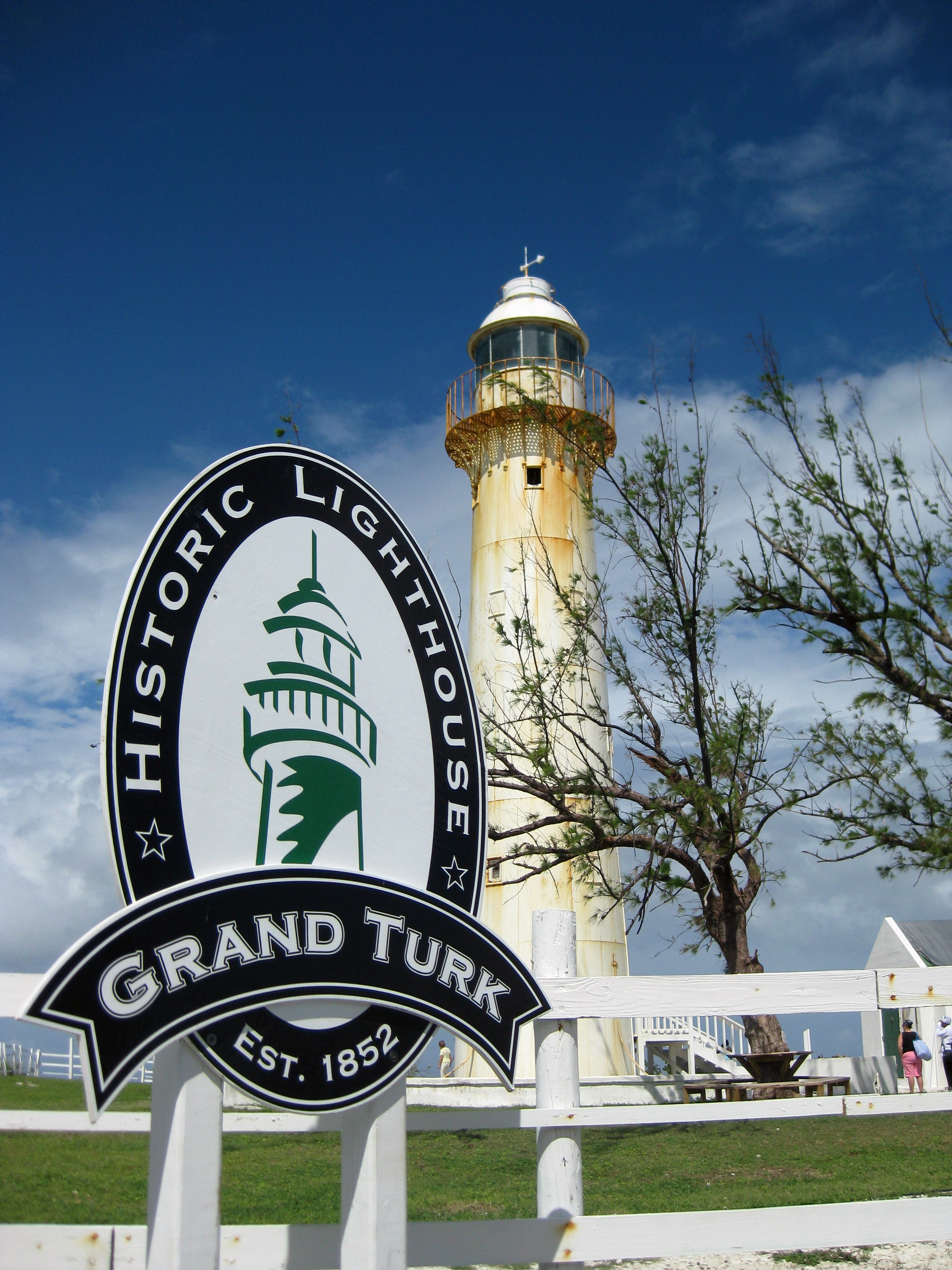
The 1852 lighthouse on Grand Turk

From the mid-1600s Bermudian salt collectors began seasonally visiting the islands, later settling more permanently with their African slaves. For several decades around the turn of the 17th century, the islands became popular pirate hideouts. During the Anglo-French War (1778–1783) the French captured the archipelago in 1783; however, it was later confirmed as a British colony with the Treaty of Paris (1783). After the American War of Independence (1775–1783), many Loyalists fled to British Caribbean colonies, also bringing with them African slaves. They developed cotton as an important cash crop, but it was superseded by the development of the salt industry, with the labour carried out by slaves bought and transported from Africa or the other Caribbean islands and their descendants, who soon came to outnumber the European settlers.

In 1799, both the Turks and the Caicos island groups were annexed by Britain as part of the Bahamas. The processing of sea salt was developed as a highly important export product from the West Indies and continued to be a major export product into the nineteenth century.

=== 19th century ===
In 1807, Britain prohibited the slave trade and, in 1833, abolished slavery in its colonies. British ships sometimes intercepted slave traders in the Caribbean, and some ships were wrecked off the coast of these islands. In 1837, the Esperança, a Portuguese slaver, was wrecked off East Caicos, one of the larger islands. While the crew and 220 captive Africans survived the shipwreck, 18 Africans died before the survivors were taken to Nassau. Africans from this ship may have been among the 189 liberated Africans whom the British colonists settled in the Turks and Caicos from 1833 to 1840.

In 1841, the Trouvadore, an illegal Spanish slave ship, was wrecked off the coast of East Caicos. All of the 20-man crew and 192 captive Africans survived the sinking. Officials freed the Africans and arranged for 168 persons to be apprenticed to island proprietors on Grand Turk for one year. They increased the small population of the colony by seven per cent. The remaining 24 were resettled in Nassau, Bahamas. The Spanish crew were also taken there, to be turned over to the custody of the Cuban consul and taken to Cuba for prosecution. An 1878 letter documents the "Trouvadore Africans" and their descendants as constituting an essential part of the "labouring population" on the islands. In 2004, marine archaeologists affiliated with the Turks and Caicos National Museum discovered a wreck, called the "Black Rock Ship", that subsequent research has suggested might be that of the Trouvadore. In November 2008, a cooperative marine archaeology expedition, funded by the United States National Oceanographic and Atmospheric Administration, confirmed that the wreck has artifacts whose style and date of manufacture link them to the Trouvadore.

In 1848, Britain designated the Turks and Caicos as a separate colony under a council president. In 1873–4, the islands were made part of the Jamaica colony; in 1894, the chief colonial official was restyled commissioner. In 1917, Canadian Prime Minister Robert Borden suggested that the Turks and Caicos join Canada, but this suggestion was rejected by British Prime Minister David Lloyd George and the islands remained a dependency of Jamaica.

=== 20th and 21st centuries ===
On 4 July 1959, the islands were again designated as a separate colony, the last commissioner being restyled administrator. The governor of Jamaica also continued as the governor of the islands. When Jamaica was granted independence from Britain in August 1962, the Turks and Caicos Islands became a Crown colony. Beginning in 1965, the governor of the Bahamas was also governor of the Turks and Caicos Islands and oversaw affairs for the islands.

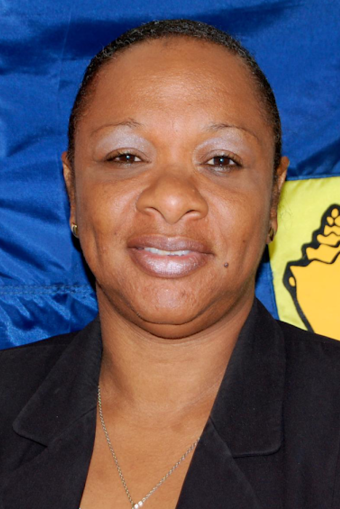
Sharlene Cartwright-Robinson, the first female Premier of Turks and Caicos, served from 2016 to 2021.

When the Bahamas gained independence in 1973, the Turks and Caicos received their own governor (the last administrator was restyled). In 1974, Canadian New Democratic Party MP Max Saltsman proposed in his private member's bill C-249, "An Act Respecting a Proposed Association Between Canada and the Caribbean Turks and Caicos Islands" that Canada form an association with the Turks and Caicos Islands; however, it was never submitted to a vote. Since August 1976, the islands have had their own government headed by a chief minister (now premier), the first of whom was J. A. G. S. McCartney. Moves towards independence in the early 1980s were stalled by the election of an anti-independence party in 1980 and since then the islands have remained British territory. Local government was suspended from 1986 to 1988, following allegation of government involvement with drug trafficking which resulted in the arrest of Chief Minister Norman Saunders.

In 2002, the islands were re-designated a British Overseas Territory, with islanders gaining full British citizenship. A new constitution was promulgated in 2006; however in 2009 Premier Michael Misick of the Progressive National Party (PNP) resigned in the face of corruption charges, and the United Kingdom took over direct control of the government.

During this period of direct British rule, in 2010, the leaders of The Bahamas and the Turks and Caicos Islands discussed the possibility of forming a federation.

A new constitution was promulgated in October 2012 and the government was returned to full local administration after the November 2012 elections. Rufus Ewing of the PNP was elected as the new, restored, premier.

In the 2016 elections, the PNP lost for the first time since they replaced Derek Hugh Taylor's government in 2003. The People's Democratic Movement (PDM) came to power with Sharlene Cartwright-Robinson as Premier. She was replaced by Washington Misick after the PNP returned to power after winning the 2021 general elections.

Since 2020, the ongoing conflict in nearby Haiti has spilled over into the islands. On 28 July 2025 three people were killed and 10 others injured in the first mass shooting in the islands' history at a popular nightspot in Providenciales; police said it was perpetrated by a Haitian gang.

== Geography and environment ==
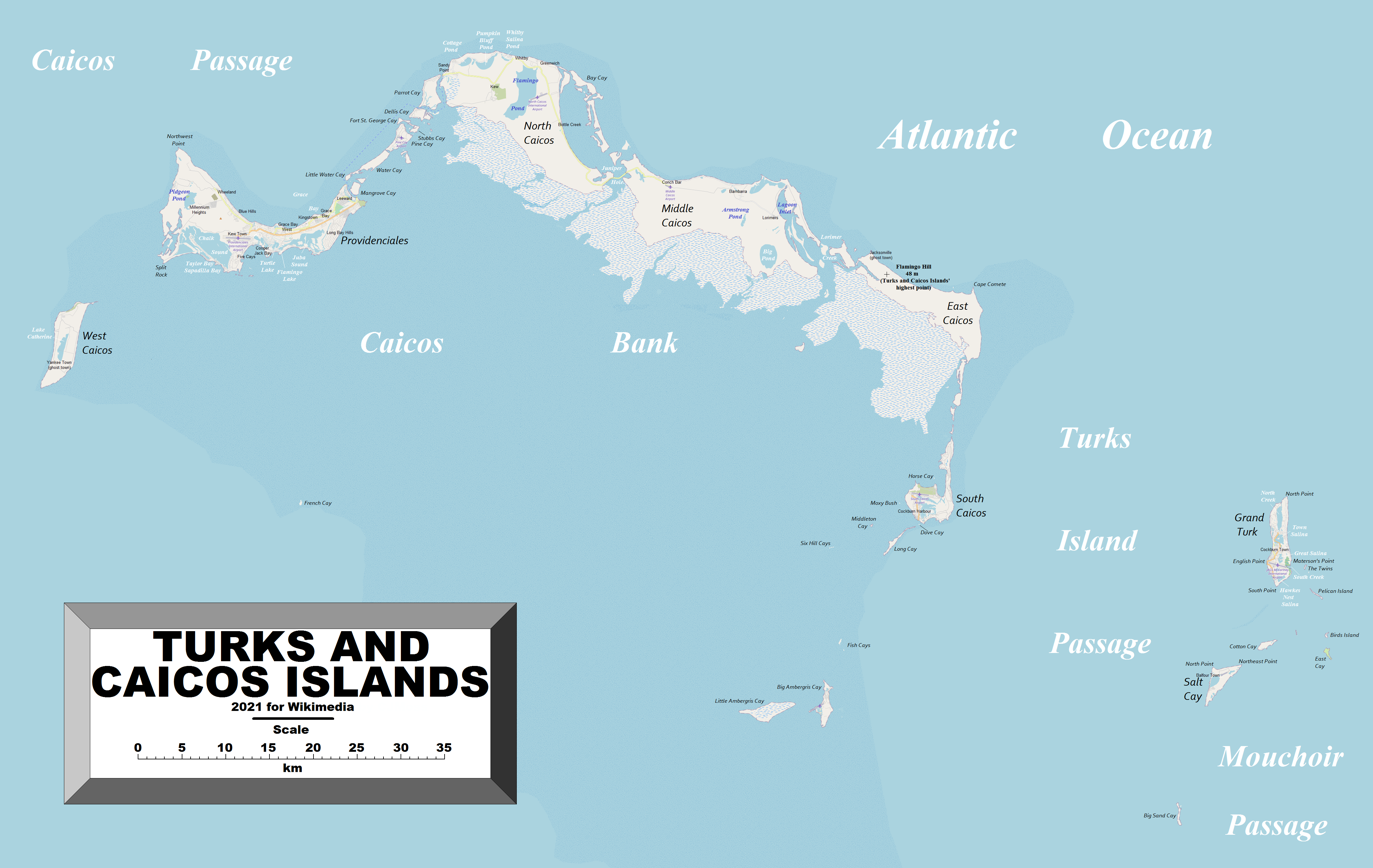
A map of the Turks and Caicos Islands

A map showing the location of the Turks and Caicos Islands within the Caribbean Sea

The two island groups are in the North Atlantic Ocean about 160 kilometres (99 mi) north of Hispaniola and about 1,000 kilometres (620 mi) from Miami in the United States, at 21.78°N 71.80°W. The territory is geographically contiguous to the Bahamas, both comprising the Lucayan Archipelago, but is politically a separate entity. The Caicos Islands are separated by the Caicos Passage from the closest Bahamian islands, Mayaguana and Great Inagua. The nearest foreign landmass to the Turks and Caicos Islands is the Bahamian island of Little Inagua, about 30 miles (48 km) from West Caicos.

The eight main islands and more than 22 smaller islands have a total land area of 616.3 square kilometres (238.0 square miles), consisting primarily of low, flat limestone with extensive marshes and mangrove swamps and 332 square kilometres (128 sq mi) of beach front. The tallest peaks in the islands are Blue Hills on Providenciales and Flamingo Hill on East Caicos, both at 48 m (157 ft). The weather is usually sunny (it is generally regarded that the islands receive 350 days of sun each year) and relatively dry, but suffers frequent hurricanes. The islands have limited natural fresh water resources; private cisterns collect rainwater for drinking. The primary natural resources are spiny lobster, conch, and other shellfish. Turks and Caicos contains three terrestrial ecoregions: Bahamian dry forests, Bahamian pineyards, and Bahamian-Antillean mangroves.

The two distinct island groups are separated by the Turks Island Passage.

=== Turks Islands ===
The Turks Islands are separated from the Caicos Islands by the Turks Island Passage, which is more than 2,200 m (7,200 ft) deep. The islands form a chain that stretches north–south. The 2012 census population was 4,939 on the two main islands, the only inhabited islands of the group:

- Grand Turk (with the capital of the territory, area 17.39 km^{2} (6.71 sq mi), population 4,831)
- Salt Cay (area 6.74 km^{2} (2.60 sq mi), population 108)

Together with nearby islands, all on Turks Bank, those two main islands form the two administrative districts of the territory (out of six in total) that fall within the Turks Islands. Turks Bank, which is smaller than Caicos Bank, has a total area of about 324 km^{2} (125 sq mi).

The main uninhabited islands are:

- Big Sand Cay
- Cotton Cay
- East Cay
- Endymion Rock
- Gibbs Cay
- Pear Cay

=== Mouchoir Bank ===
25 kilometres (16 mi) east of the Turks Islands and separated from them by Mouchoir Passage is the Mouchoir Bank. Although it has no emergent cays or islets, some parts are very shallow and the water breaks on them. Mouchoir Bank is part of the Turks and Caicos Islands and falls within its Exclusive Economic Zone. It measures 958 square kilometres (370 sq mi) in area. Two banks further east, Silver Bank and Navidad Bank, are geographically a continuation, but belong politically to the Dominican Republic.

=== Caicos Islands ===
The largest island in the Caicos archipelago is the sparsely inhabited Middle Caicos, which measures 144 square kilometres (56 sq mi) in area, but had a population of only 168 at the 2012 Census. The most populated island is Providenciales, with 23,769 inhabitants in 2012, and an area of 122 square kilometres (47 sq mi). North Caicos (116 square kilometres (45 sq mi) in area) had 1,312 inhabitants. South Caicos (21 square kilometres (8.1 sq mi) in area) had 1,139 inhabitants, and Parrot Cay (6 square kilometres (2.3 sq mi) in area) had 131 inhabitants. East Caicos (which is administered as part of South Caicos District) is uninhabited, while the only permanent inhabitants of West Caicos (administered as part of Providenciales District) are resort staff.

The Caicos Islands comprise the following main islands:

- Ambergris Cay
- Bay Cay
- Bush Cay
- Dellis Cay
- Donna Cay
- Dove Cay
- East Bay Cay
- East Caicos
- Fish Cays
- Five Cays
- Five Little Cays
- Fort George Cay
- French Cay
- Little Water Cay
- Long Cay
- Mangrove Cay
- Middle Caicos
- Middleton Cay
- North Caicos
- Parrot Cay
- Pine Cay
- Plandon Cay
- Providenciales
- Seal Cays
- Six Hill Cays
- South Caicos
- Stubbs Cay
- Water Cay
- West Caicos
- West Sand Spit

=== Climate ===
The Turks and Caicos Islands feature a tropical savanna climate (Köppen Aw), with relatively consistent temperatures throughout the course of the year. Summertime temperatures rarely exceed 33 °C (91.4 °F) and winter nighttime temperatures rarely fall below 18 °C (64.4 °F). Water temperature in the summer is 27.8 to 28.9 °C (82 to 84 °F) and in winter about 23.3 to 25.6 °C (74 to 78 °F). A constant trade wind keeps the climate at a very comfortable level.

=== Biodiversity ===
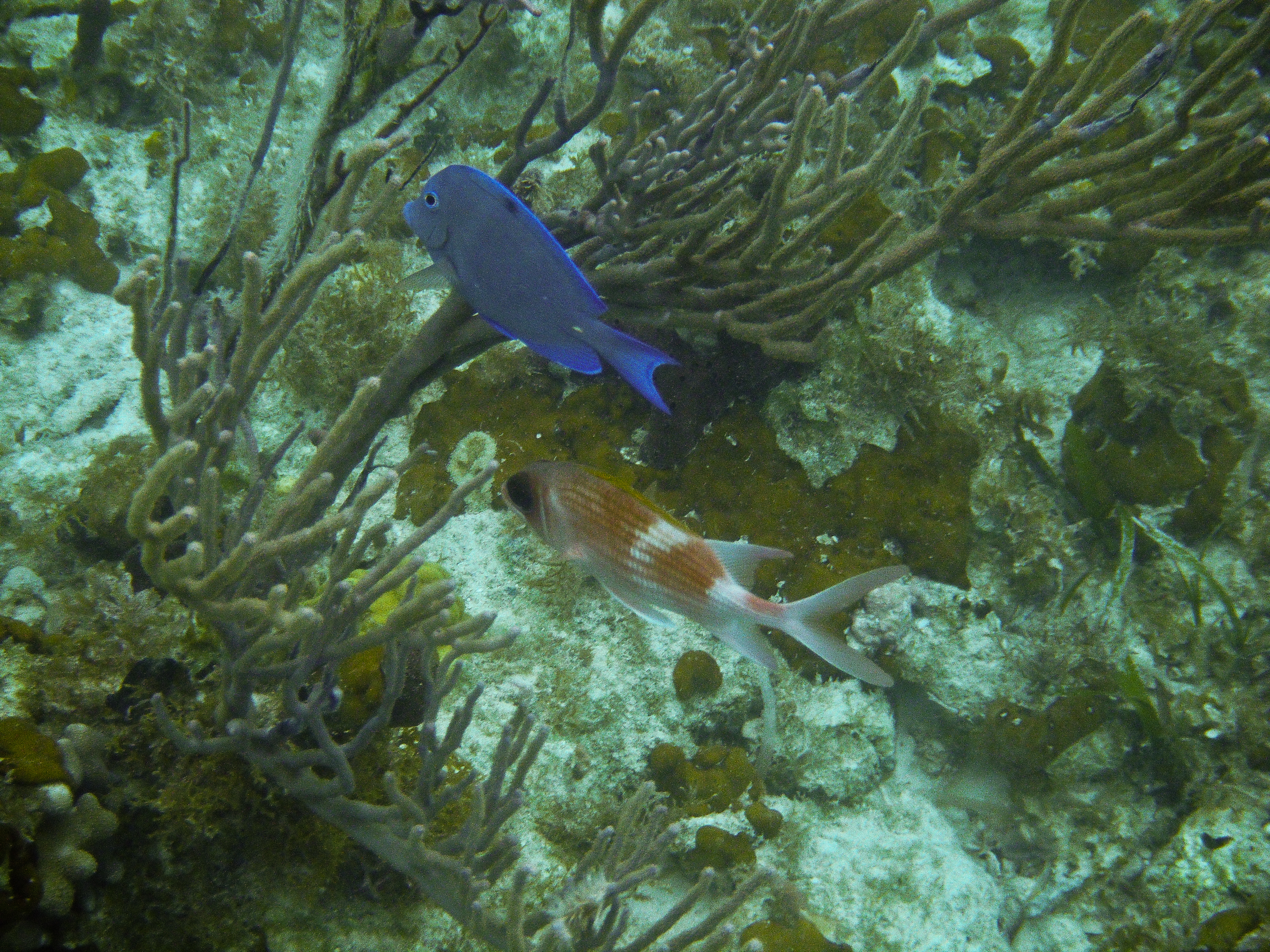
A blue tang and a squirrelfish in Princess Alexandra Land and Sea National Park, Providenciales

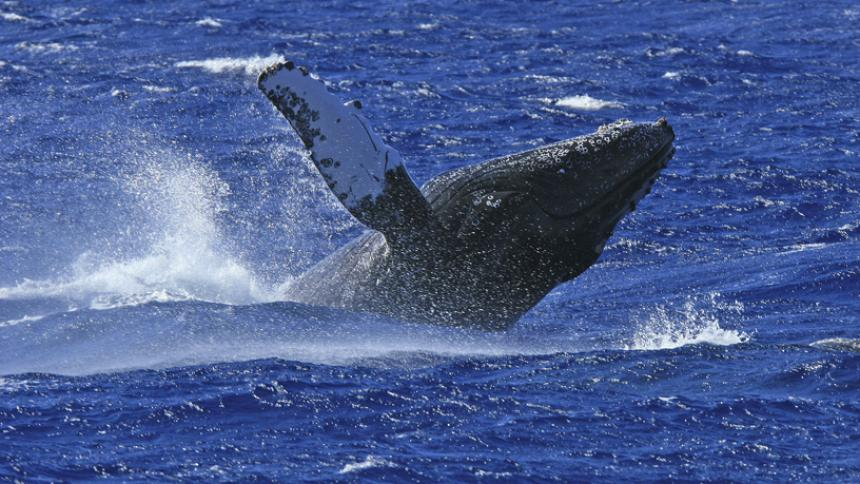
Humpback whale breaching off South Caicos

The Turks and Caicos Islands are a biodiversity hotspot. The islands have many endemic species and others of international importance, due to the conditions created by the oldest established salt-pan development in the Caribbean. The variety of species includes a number of endemic species of lizards, snakes, insects and plants, and marine organisms; in addition to being an important breeding area for seabirds.

The UK and Turks and Caicos Islands Governments have joint responsibility for the conservation and preservation to meet obligations under international environmental conventions.

Due to this significance, the islands are on the United Kingdom's tentative list for future UNESCO World Heritage Sites.

== Politics ==
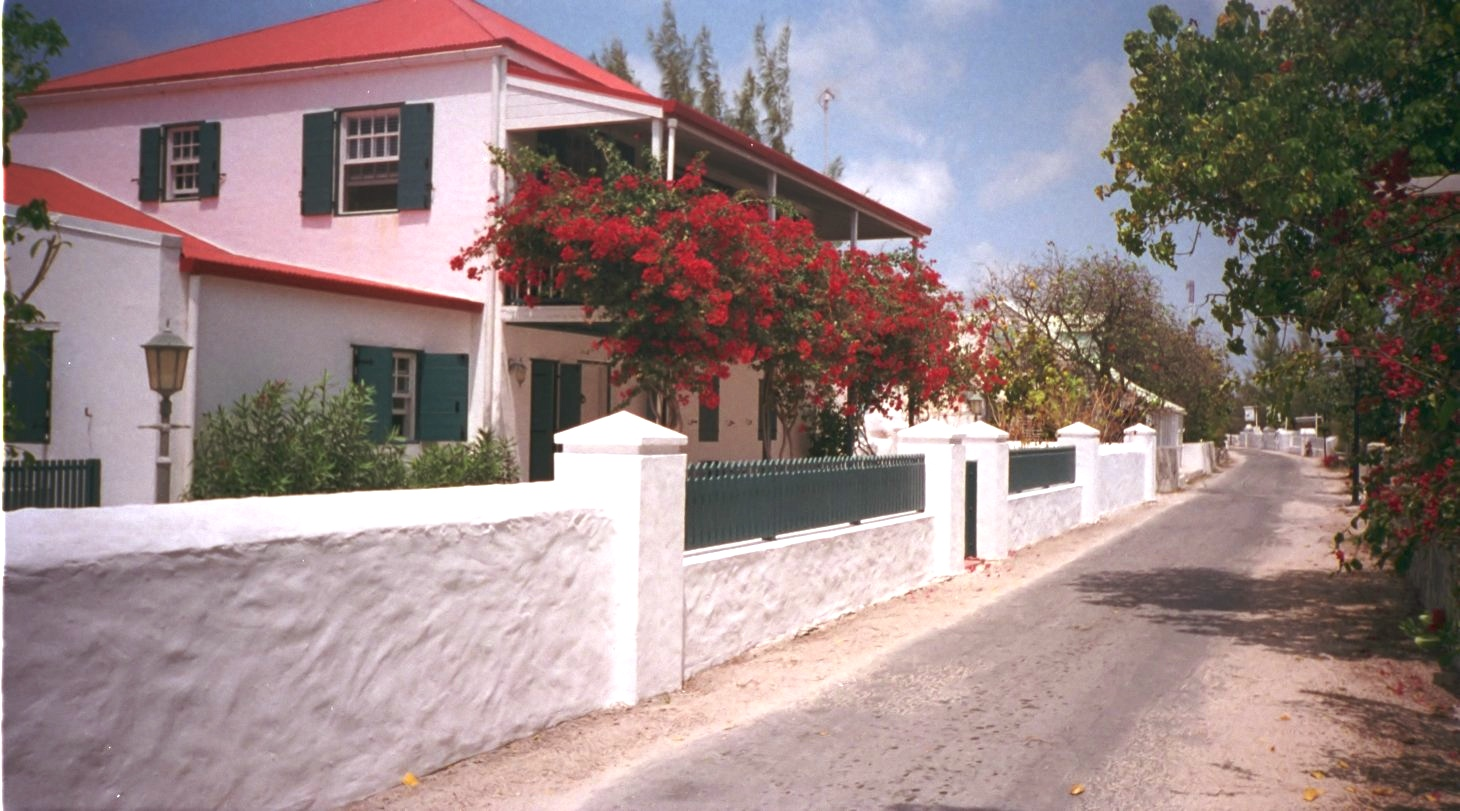
A street in Cockburn Town, the capital of the Turks and Caicos Islands

The Turks and Caicos Islands are a British Overseas Territory. As a British territory, its sovereign is Charles III, King of the United Kingdom, represented by a governor appointed by the monarch, on the advice of the Foreign Office. With the election of the territory's first Chief Minister, J. A. G. S. McCartney, the islands first adopted a constitution on 30 August 1976. The national holiday, Constitution Day, is celebrated annually on 30 August.

The territory's legal system is based on English common law, with a small number of laws adopted from Jamaica and the Bahamas. Suffrage is universal for those over 18 years of age. English is the official language. Grand Turk is the administrative and political capital of the Turks and Caicos Islands and Cockburn Town has been the seat of government since 1766.

The Turks and Caicos Islands participate in the Caribbean Development Bank, is an associate in CARICOM, a member of the Universal Postal Union and maintains an Interpol sub-bureau. The United Nations Special Committee on Decolonization includes the territory on the United Nations list of non-self-governing territories.

Under the new Constitution that came into effect in October 2012, legislative power is held by a unicameral House of Assembly, consisting of 19 seats, 15 elected and four appointed by the governor; of elected members, five are elected at large and 10 from single-member districts for four-year terms.

In the 2021 elections the Progressive National Party won in a landslide and Washington Misick became Premier.

=== Administrative divisions ===
The Turks and Caicos Islands are divided into six administrative districts (two in the Turks Islands and four in the Caicos Islands), headed by district commissioners. For the House of Assembly, the Turks and Caicos Islands are divided into 15 electoral districts (four in the Turks Islands and eleven in the Caicos Islands).

=== Judiciary ===
The judicial branch of government is headed by a Supreme Court; appeals are heard by the Court of Appeal and final appeals by the United Kingdom's Judicial Committee of the Privy Council. There are three justices of the Supreme Court, a Chief Justice and two others. The Court of Appeal consists of a president and at least two justices of appeal.

Magistrates' Courts are the lower courts and appeals from Magistrates' Courts are sent to the Supreme Court.

As of April 2020, the Chief Justice is Justice Mabel Agyemang.

==== List of chief justices ====
- 1985–1987: John Charles Rowell Fieldsend
- 1987–1990: Frederick Smith
- 1998–2004: Richard William Ground
- 2004–2007: Christopher James Ellis Gardner
- 2008–2012: Frederick Gordon Roy Ward
- 2014–2020: Margaret Ramsay-Hale
- 2020–present: Mabel Maame Agyemang

=== Public safety ===
Policing is primarily the responsibility of the Royal Turks and Caicos Islands Police Force. Customs and border enforcement is the responsibility of the Border Force. At times these may be supported by the Turks and Caicos Islands Regiment.

In 2024, the Turks and Caicos Islands had the highest murder rate per capita in Latin America and the Caribbean, a large portion gang-related.

=== Military and defence ===
The defence of the Turks and Caicos Islands is the responsibility of the United Kingdom. The Royal Navy maintains a persistent presence in the Caribbean through the Atlantic Patrol Task (North) mission. A River-class offshore patrol vessel, is often deployed to the region, including visits to the Turks and Caicos Islands. During a visit in November 2024, HMS Medway conducted disaster response exercises and engaged with local authorities to reinforce the UK's commitment to regional security and humanitarian assistance. In response to a surge in gang-related violence in 2022, the Royal Fleet Auxiliary deployed RFA Tideforce to the Turks and Caicos Islands. Equipped with a Wildcat helicopter, Tideforce provided surveillance support to local law enforcement agencies to address the escalating security concerns.

==== Turks and Caicos Islands Regiment ====
In December 2019, Governor Nigel Dakin announced the formation of the Turks and Caicos Islands Regiment, with assistance from the UK's Ministry of Defence. The regiment is modelled after similar units in other British Overseas Territories and focuses on national security, disaster response, and engineering support.

In spring 2020, a Security and Assistance Team from the United Kingdom Ministry of Defence arrived in Turks and Caicos to assist with the COVID-19 pandemic, the 2020 Atlantic hurricane season, and to help build the new Turks and Caicos Regiment. The regiment became operational in 2020, with Lieutenant Colonel Ennis Grant appointed as its first commanding officer. Since its inception, the regiment has participated in various training exercises and operations, including joint disaster response drills with HMS Medway during its 2024 visit.

== Demographics ==
=== Population ===
Historical population
| Year | Pop. | ±% |
|---|---|---|
| 1911 | 5,615 | — |
| 1921 | 5,522 | −1.7% |
| 1943 | 6,138 | +11.2% |
| 1960 | 5,668 | −7.7% |
| 1970 | 5,558 | −1.9% |
| 1980 | 7,413 | +33.4% |
| 1990 | 11,465 | +54.7% |
| 2000 | 20,014 | +74.6% |
| 2012 | 31,458 | +57.2% |

Eight of the thirty islands in the territory are inhabited, with a total population estimated from preliminary results of the census of 25 January 2012 (released on 12 August 2012) of 31,458 inhabitants, an increase of 58.2% from the population of 19,886 reported in the 2001 census. July 2021 estimates put the population at 57,196. One-third of the population is under 15 years old, and 4% are 65 or older. In 2000 the population was growing at a rate of 3.55% per year. The infant mortality rate was 18.66 deaths per 1,000 live births and the life expectancy at birth was 73.28 years (71.15 years for males, 75.51 years for females). The total fertility rate was 3.25 children born per woman. The annual population growth rate is 2.82%.

The CIA World Factbook breaks down the islanders' ethnicity as African 87%, European 7.9%, Mixed 2.5.%, East Indian 1.3% and Other 0.7%. There is a small Dominican and Haitian community on the islands.

==== Population by island ====
| Island | Capital | Area (km^{2}) | Population (Note: Area and population data retrieved from the 2012 census.) | Native Lucayan Name | Notes |
|---|---|---|---|---|---|
Caicos Islands
| South Caicos | Cockburn Harbour | 21.2 | 2,013 | Kasiba | |
| West Caicos | New Marina | 28 | 10 | Makobisa | Resort staff only |
| Providenciales | Downtown Providenciales | 122 | 23,253 | Yukanaka Yanikana | |
| Pine Cay | South Bay Village | 3.2 | 30 | Buyana | Resort staff only |
| Parrot Cay | Parrot Cay Village | 5 | 90 | | Half resort staff, half residential |
| North Caicos | Bottle Creek | 116.4 | 2,066 | Kaiko | |
| Middle Caicos | Conch Bar | 136 | 522 | Aniyana | |
| Ambergris Cays | Big Ambergris Cay | 10.9 | 50 | | |
| Other Caicos Islands | East Caicos | 146.5 | 0 | Wana | |
Turks Islands
| Grand Turk | Cockburn Town | 17.6 | 8,051 | Amuana | |
| Salt Cay | Balfour Town | 7.1 | 315 | Kanamani Kanomani | |
| Other Turks Islands | Cotton Cay | 2.4 | 0 | Makarike | |
| Turks and Caicos Islands | Cockburn Town | 616.3 | 49000 | | |

=== Structure of the population ===
Population estimates by sex and age group (1 August 2017)
| Age group | Male | Female | Total | % |
|---|---|---|---|---|
| Total | 20296 | 19496 | 39792 | 100 |
| 0–4 | 1426 | 1398 | 2824 | 7.10 |
| 5–9 | 1270 | 1229 | 2499 | 6.28 |
| 10–14 | 1146 | 1157 | 2303 | 5.79 |
| 15–19 | 1111 | 1155 | 2266 | 5.69 |
| 20–24 | 1306 | 1365 | 2671 | 6.71 |
| 25–29 | 1582 | 1650 | 3232 | 8.12 |
| 30–34 | 1889 | 1885 | 3774 | 9.48 |
| 35–39 | 2248 | 2140 | 4388 | 11.03 |
| 40–44 | 2162 | 2010 | 4172 | 10.48 |
| 45–49 | 1948 | 1770 | 3718 | 9.34 |
| 50–54 | 1553 | 1396 | 2949 | 7.41 |
| 55–59 | 1050 | 933 | 1983 | 4.98 |
| 60–64 | 730 | 636 | 1366 | 3.43 |
| 65–69 | 445 | 375 | 820 | 2.06 |
| 70–74 | 258 | 213 | 471 | 1.18 |
| 75–79 | 112 | 94 | 206 | 0.52 |
| 80+ | 60 | 90 | 150 | 0.38 |
| Age group | Male | Female | Total | Percent |
| 0–14 | 3842 | 3784 | 7626 | 19.16 |
| 15–64 | 15579 | 14940 | 30519 | 76.70 |
| 65+ | 875 | 772 | 1647 | 4.14 |

=== Language ===
The official language of the islands is English, but the population also speaks Turks and Caicos Islands Creole. Due to its proximity to Cuba and Hispaniola, large Haitian Creole and Spanish-speaking communities have developed in the territory due to immigration, both legal and illegal, from Haitian Creole-speaking Haiti and from Spanish-speaking Cuba and Dominican Republic.

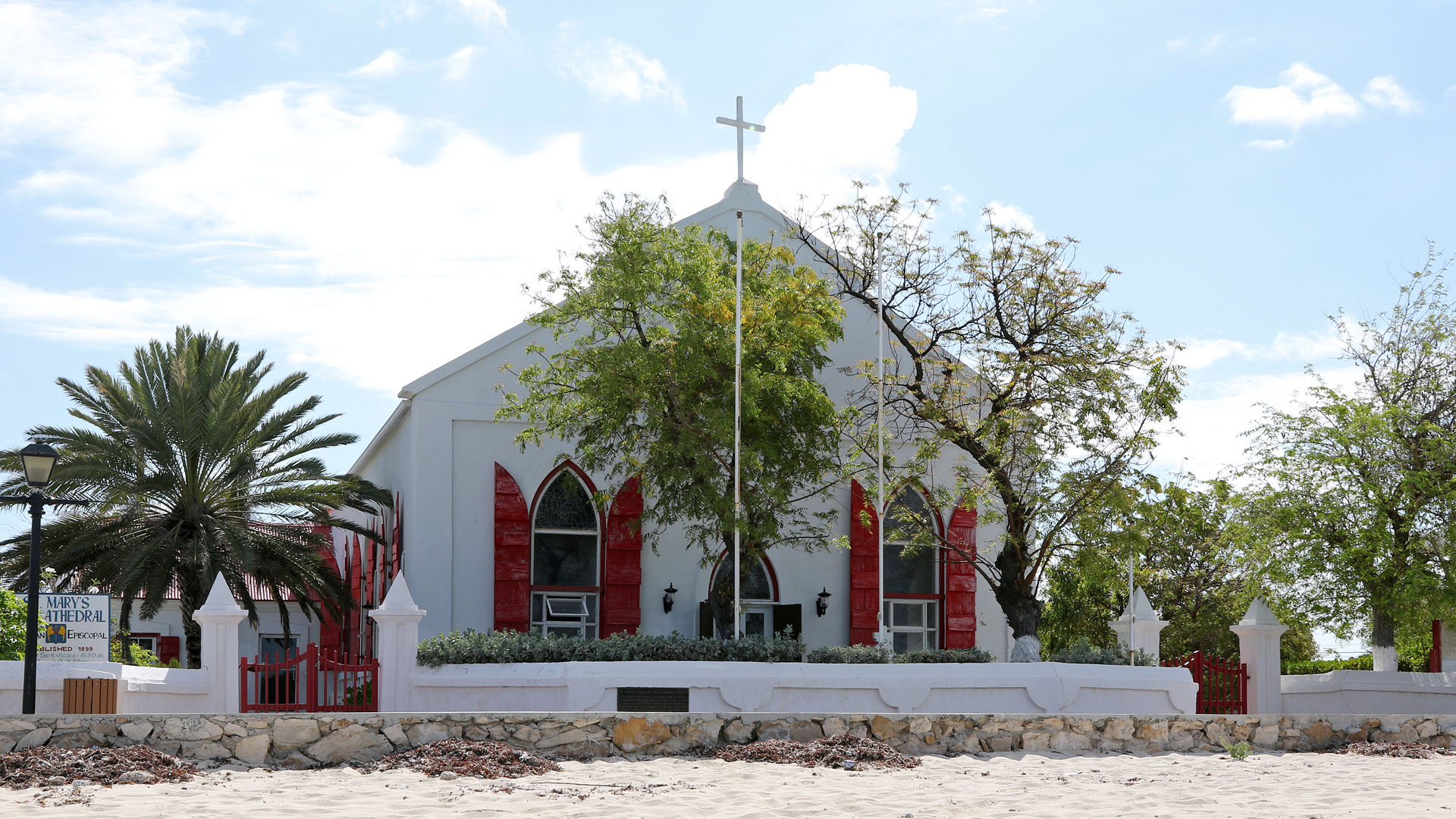
St. Mary's Cathedral, Grand Turk

=== Religion ===
86% of the population of Turks and Caicos are Christian (Baptists 35.8%, Church of God 11.7%, Roman Catholics 11.4%, Anglicans 10%, Methodists 9.3%, Seventh-day Adventists 6%, Jehovah's Witnesses 1.8%), with other faiths making up the remaining 14%.

Catholics are served by the Mission Sui Iuris for Turks and Caicos, which was erected in 1984 with territory taken from the then Diocese of Nassau.

Religion in Turks and Caicos Islands (ARDA 2020 est.)
1. Protestant (39.7%)
2. Catholic (1.06%)
3. Other Christian (49.2%)
4. No religion (6.91%)
5. other (3.06%)

=== Culture ===
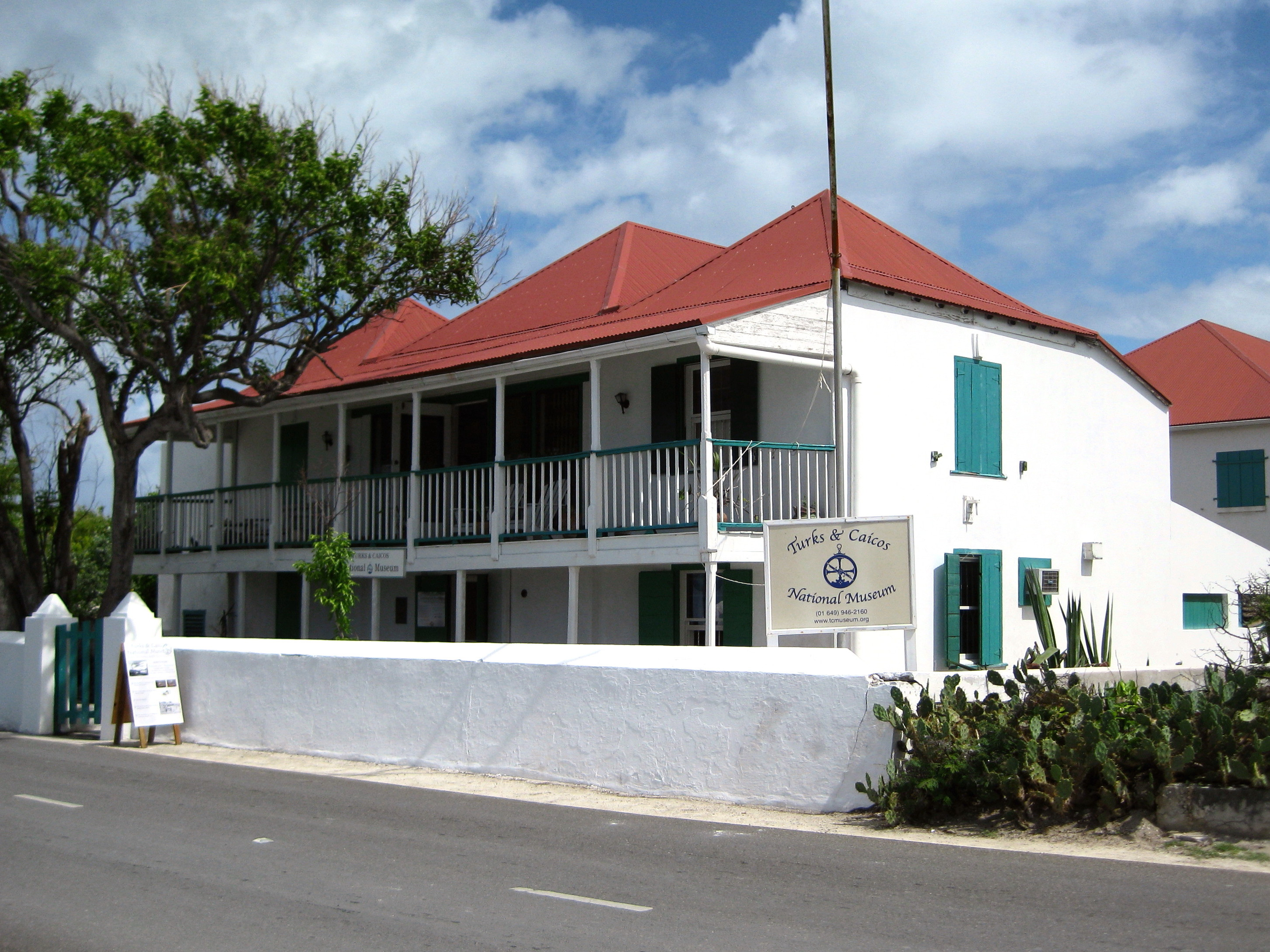
The Turks and Caicos National Museum on Grand Turk

The Turks and Caicos Islands are perhaps best known musically for ripsaw music, a genre which originated on the islands. The Turks and Caicos Islands are known for their annual Music and Cultural Festival showcasing many local talents and other dynamic performances by many music celebrities from around the Caribbean and United States.

Women continue traditional crafts of using straw to make baskets and hats on the larger Caicos islands. It is possible that this continued tradition is related to the liberated Africans who joined the population directly from Africa in the 1830s and 1841 from shipwrecked slavers; they brought cultural craft skills with them.

The island's most popular sports are fishing, sailing, football (soccer) and cricket (which is the national sport).

Turks and Caicos cuisine is based primarily around seafood, especially conch. Two common local dishes are conch fritters and conch salad.

=== Citizenship ===
Because the Turks and Caicos is a British Overseas Territory and not an independent country, its nationality laws are partly determined by British nationality law and its history. People with close ties to Britain's Overseas Territories all hold the same nationality: British Overseas Territories citizenship (BOTC), originally defined by the British Nationality Act 1981 as British Dependent Territories citizenship. BOTC, however, does not confer any right to live in any British Overseas Territory, including the territory from which it is derived. Instead, the rights normally associated with citizenship derive from what is called belonger status and island natives or those descended from natives are said to be Belongers. The Turks and Caicos government amended its immigration law in 2021 in that regard, making the granting of Belonger Status exclusive to "being married for ten years to a Belonger (other than a Belonger by marriage), or by being the dependent child of someone who becomes a Belonger by marriage." It was also made possible "for someone who has invested $500,000 or more in Providenciales or West Caicos, or $250,000 or more in Grand Turk or the family Islands, to obtain a residence permit for up to ten years."

In 2002, the British Overseas Territories Act restored full British citizenship status to all citizens of British Overseas Territories, including the Turks and Caicos.

== Education ==
The Ministry of Education, Youth, Sports and Library Services oversees education in Turks and Caicos. Public education is supported by taxation and is mandatory for children aged five to sixteen. Primary education lasts for six years and secondary education lasts for five years. In the 1990s the Primary In-Service Teacher Education Project (PINSTEP) was launched in an effort to increase the skills of its primary school teachers, nearly one-quarter of whom were unqualified. Turks and Caicos also worked to refurbish its primary schools, reduce textbook costs, and increase equipment and supplies given to schools. For example, in September 1993, each primary school was given enough books to allow teachers to establish in-class libraries. In 2001, the student-teacher ratio at the primary level was roughly 15:1.

Public secondary schools include:

- HJ Robinson High School (Grand Turk)
- Clement Howell High School (Providenciales)
- Long Bay High School (Providenciales)
- Raymond Gardiner High School (North Caicos)
- Marjorie Basden High School (South Caicos)

International School of the Turks and Caicos Islands, a private school which serves preschool through grade six, is in Leeward, Providenciales. In 2014 it had 106 students. It was known as The Ashcroft School until 2014.

The Turks and Caicos Islands Community College offers free higher education to students who have successfully completed their secondary education. The community college also oversees an adult literacy program. Once a student completes their education at Turks and Caicos Islands Community College, they are allowed to further their education at a university in the United States, Canada, or the United Kingdom for free. They have to commit to working in the Turks and Caicos Islands for four years to receive this additional education.

Charisma University is a non-profit private university recognised by the Turks and Caicos Islands Ministry of Education, Youth, Sports and Library Services that offers accredited undergraduate, graduate, and post-graduate degree programmes, along with certificate programs in various disciplines taught by over 100 faculty members.

The public University of the West Indies Open Campus has one site in the territory.

== Healthcare ==
The Turks and Caicos established a National Health Insurance Plan in 2010. Residents contribute to a National Health Insurance Plan through salary deduction and nominal user fees. The majority of care is provided by private-public-partnership hospitals managed by Interhealth Canada, one hospital in Providenciales and one hospital on Grand Turk. In addition, there are a number of government clinics and private clinics. The hospitals opened in 2010 and have been accredited by Accreditation Canada since 2012.

== Economy ==
Exports of Turks and Caicos Islands by product category (2019) Chemical products Transportation Machines Mineral products Plastics and rubbers Metals Foodstuffs Precious metals Textiles Instruments Animal products Vegetable products Paper goods Footwear and headwear Miscellaneous Stone and glass Wood products Animal and vegetable bi-products Animal hides Arts and antiques Weapons

The economy of Turks and Caicos is dominated by tourism, offshore finance and fishing. The US dollar is the main currency used on the islands.

Historically, the salt industry, along with small sponge and hemp exports, sustained the Turks and Caicos Islands (only barely, however; there was little population growth and the economy stagnated). The economy grew in the 1960s, when American investors arrived on the islands and funded the construction of an airstrip on Providenciales and built the archipelago's first hotel, "The Third Turtle". A small trickle of tourists began to arrive, supplementing the salt-based economy. Club Med Turkoise opened at Grace Bay in 1984, becoming the first beachfront hotel on the island. In the 1980s, Club Med funded an upgrading of the airstrip to allow for larger aircraft, and since then, tourism has been gradually on the increase.

In 2009, GDP contributions were as follows: Hotels & Restaurants 34.67%, Financial Services 13.12%, Construction 7.83%, Transport, Storage & Communication 9.90%, and Real Estate, Renting & Business Activities 9.56%. Most capital goods and food for domestic consumption are imported.

In 2010/2011, major sources of government revenue included Import Duties (43.31%), Stamp Duty on Land Transaction (8.82%), Work Permits and Residency Fees (10.03%) and Accommodation Tax (24.95%). The territory's gross domestic product as of late 2009 is approximately US$795 million (per capita $24,273).

The labour force totalled 27,595 workers in 2008. The labour force distribution in 2006 is as follows:

| Skill level | Percentage |
|---|---|
| Unskilled/Manual | 53% |
| Semi-skilled | 12% |
| Skilled | 20% |
| Professional | 15% |

The unemployment rate in 2008 was 8.3%. In 2007–2008, the territory took in revenues of $206.79 million against expenditures of $235.85 million. In 1995, the island received economic aid worth $5.7 million. The territory's currency is the United States dollar, with a few government fines (such as airport infractions) being payable in pounds sterling. Most commemorative coin issues are denominated in crowns.

The primary agricultural products include limited amounts of maize, beans, cassava (tapioca) and citrus fruits. Fish and conch are the only significant export, with some $169.2 million of lobster, dried and fresh conch, and conch shells exported in 2000, primarily to the United Kingdom and the United States. In recent years, however, the catch has been declining. The territory used to be an important trans-shipment point for South American narcotics destined for the United States, but due to the ongoing pressure of a combined American, Bahamian and Turks and Caicos effort this trade has been greatly reduced.

The islands import food and beverages, tobacco, clothing, manufacture and construction materials, primarily from the United States and the United Kingdom. Imports totalled $581 million in 2007.

In 2020, the islands produced and consumed 236.5 GWh of electricity, all of which came from fossil fuels.

=== Tourism ===
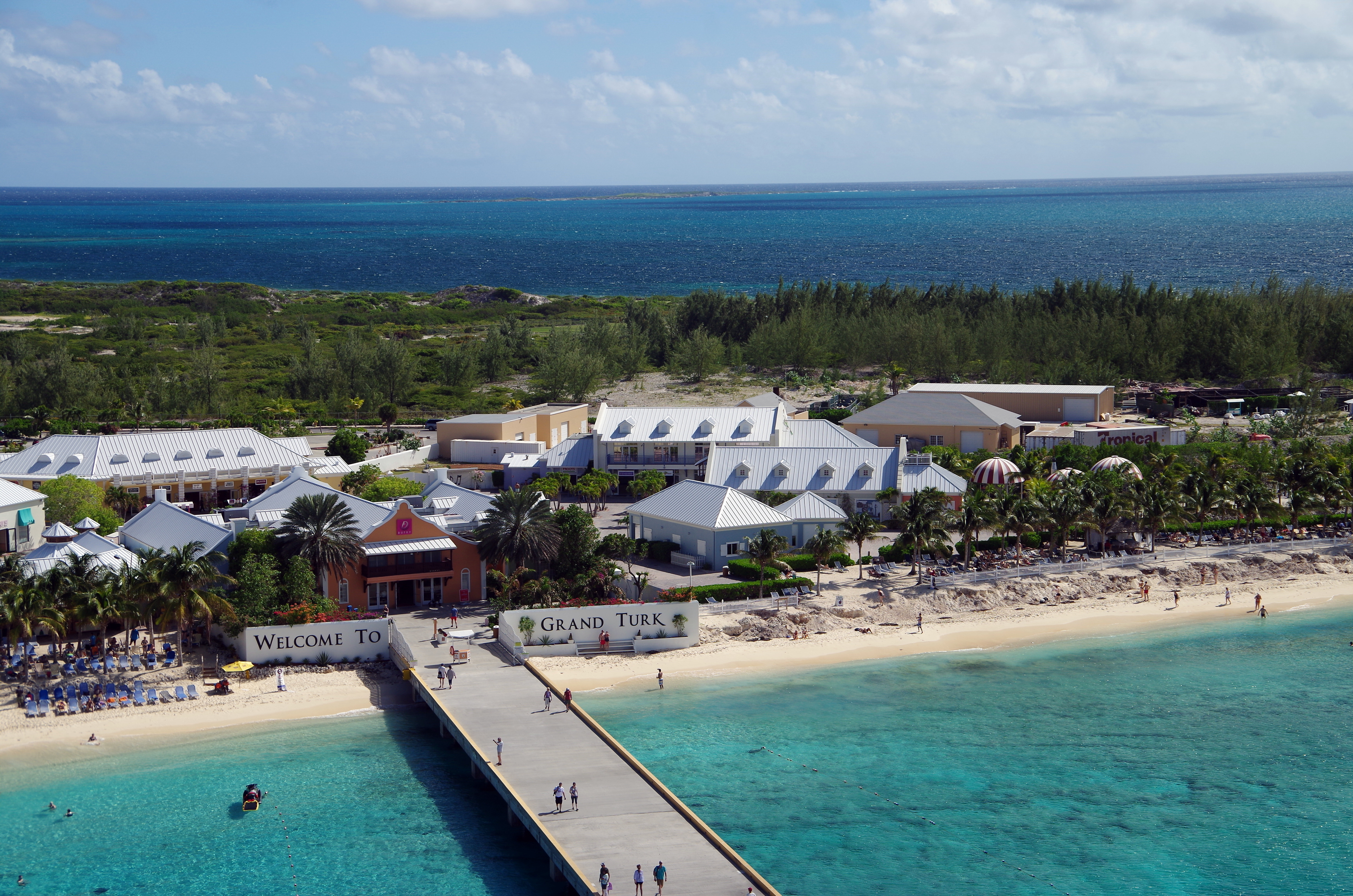
Cruise terminal at Grand Turk

Tourism is one of the largest sources of income for the islands, with most visitors coming from America via ship. Tourist arrivals had risen to 264,887 in 2007 and to 351,498 by 2009. In 2010, a total of 245 cruise ships arrived at the Grand Turk Cruise Terminal, carrying a total of 617,863 visitors.

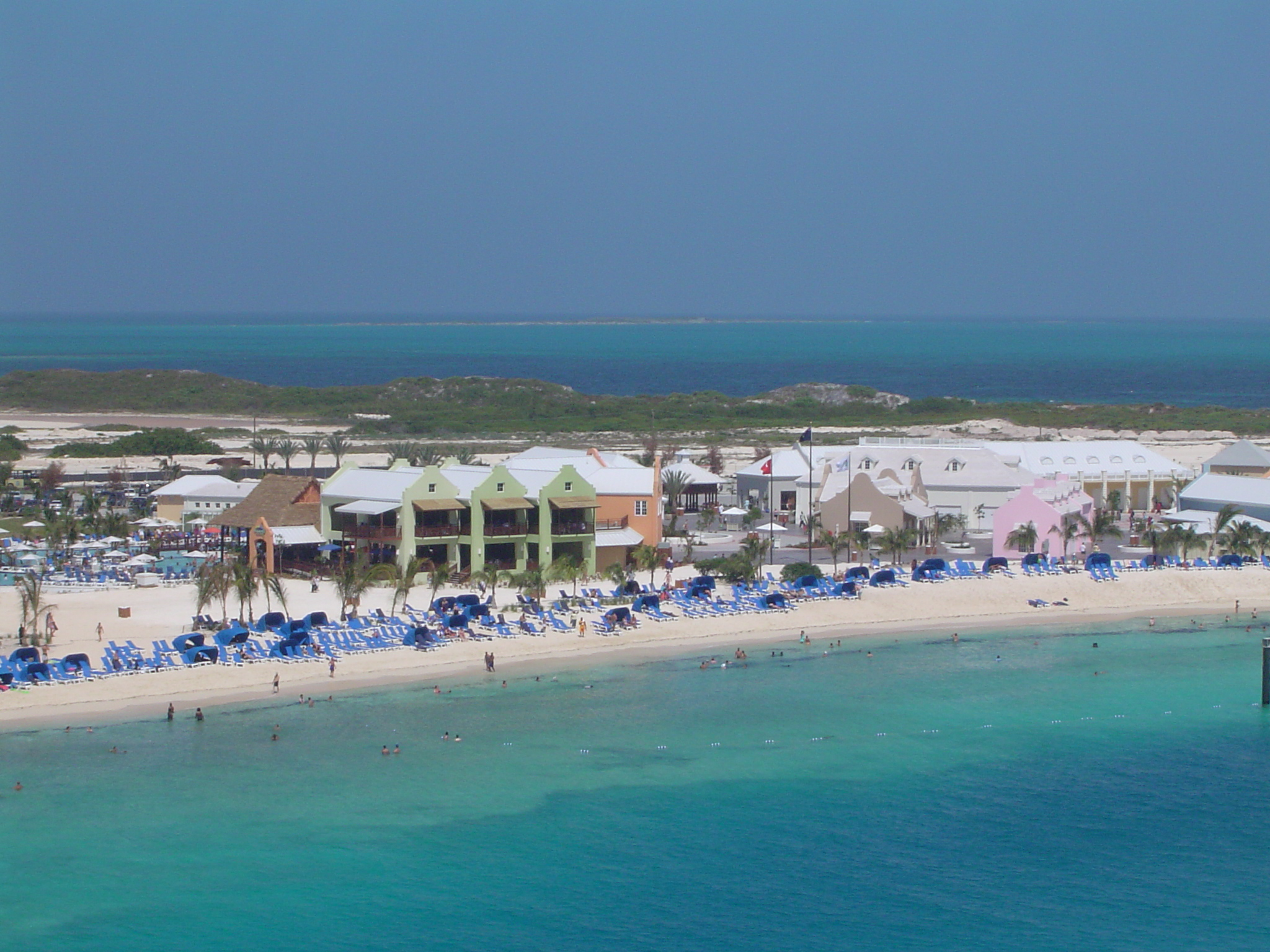
View of the southwestern beach at Grand Turk

The government is pursuing a two-pronged strategy to increase tourism. Upmarket resorts are aimed at the wealthy, while a large new cruise-ship port and recreation centre has been built for the masses visiting Grand Turk. Turks and Caicos Islands has one of the longest coral reefs in the world and the world's only conch farm.

The islands have become popular with various celebrities. Several Hollywood stars have owned homes in the Turks and Caicos, including Dick Clark and Bruce Willis. Ben Affleck and Jennifer Garner married on Parrot Cay in 2005. Actress Eva Longoria and her ex-husband Tony Parker went to the islands for their honeymoon in July 2007. Musician Nile Rodgers has a vacation home on the island.

To boost tourism during the Caribbean low season of late summer, since 2003 the Turks and Caicos Tourist Board has organised and hosted an annual series of concerts during this season called the Turks & Caicos Music and Cultural Festival. Held in a temporary bandshell at The Turtle Cove Marina in The Bight on Providenciales, this festival lasts about a week and has featured several notable international recording artists, such as Lionel Richie, LL Cool J, Anita Baker, Billy Ocean, Alicia Keys, John Legend, Kenny Rogers, Michael Bolton, Ludacris, Chaka Khan, and Boyz II Men. More than 10,000 people attend annually. In 2024 the islands had a record breaking year in tourism, with over 2 million visitors. In the same year, several American tourists were arrested for being in possession of small arms ammunition, each facing 12 year mandatory prison terms.

Resorts

- Grace Bay Club
- The Somerset on Grace Bay
- Beaches Resorts – Turks & Caicos
- Seven Stars Resort
- Alexandra Resort
- West Bay Club

== Crime ==
According to the United Nations Office on Drugs and Crime, the Turks and Caicos Islands had the highest intentional homicide rate of any country or dependent territory, at 76.5 homicides per 100,000 inhabitants.

On 6 March 2025, the U.S. State Department had issued a Level 2 travel advisory, warning people to be cautious when visiting due to crime. This advisory does not mean that travel is discouraged, but visitors should exercise increased caution.

== Transportation ==
Providenciales International Airport is the main entry point for the Turks and Caicos Islands.

The Norman B. Saunders Sr. International Airport on South Caicos offers direct international service, with American Airlines operating flights between Miami and South Caicos (Flight AA 3815), as well as domestic flights to Providenciales and Grand Turk.

The JAGS McCartney International Airport serves the capital, Cockburn Town, on Grand Turk. Altogether, there are seven airports, located on each of the inhabited islands. Five have paved runways (three of which are approximately 2,000 m (6,600 ft) long and one is approximately 1,000 m (3,300 ft) long), and the remaining two have unpaved runways (one of which is approximately 1,000 m (3,300 ft) long and the other is significantly shorter).

The islands have 121 kilometres (75 miles) of highway, 24 km (15 mi) paved and 97 km (60 mi) unpaved. Like the United States Virgin Islands and British Virgin Islands, the Turks and Caicos Islands drive on the left.

The territory's main international ports and harbours are on Grand Turk, Providenciales, and South Caicos.

The islands have no significant railways. In the early twentieth century East Caicos operated a horse-drawn railway to transport sisal from the plantation to the port. The 14-kilometre (8.7-mile) route was removed after sisal trading ceased.

=== Spaceflight ===
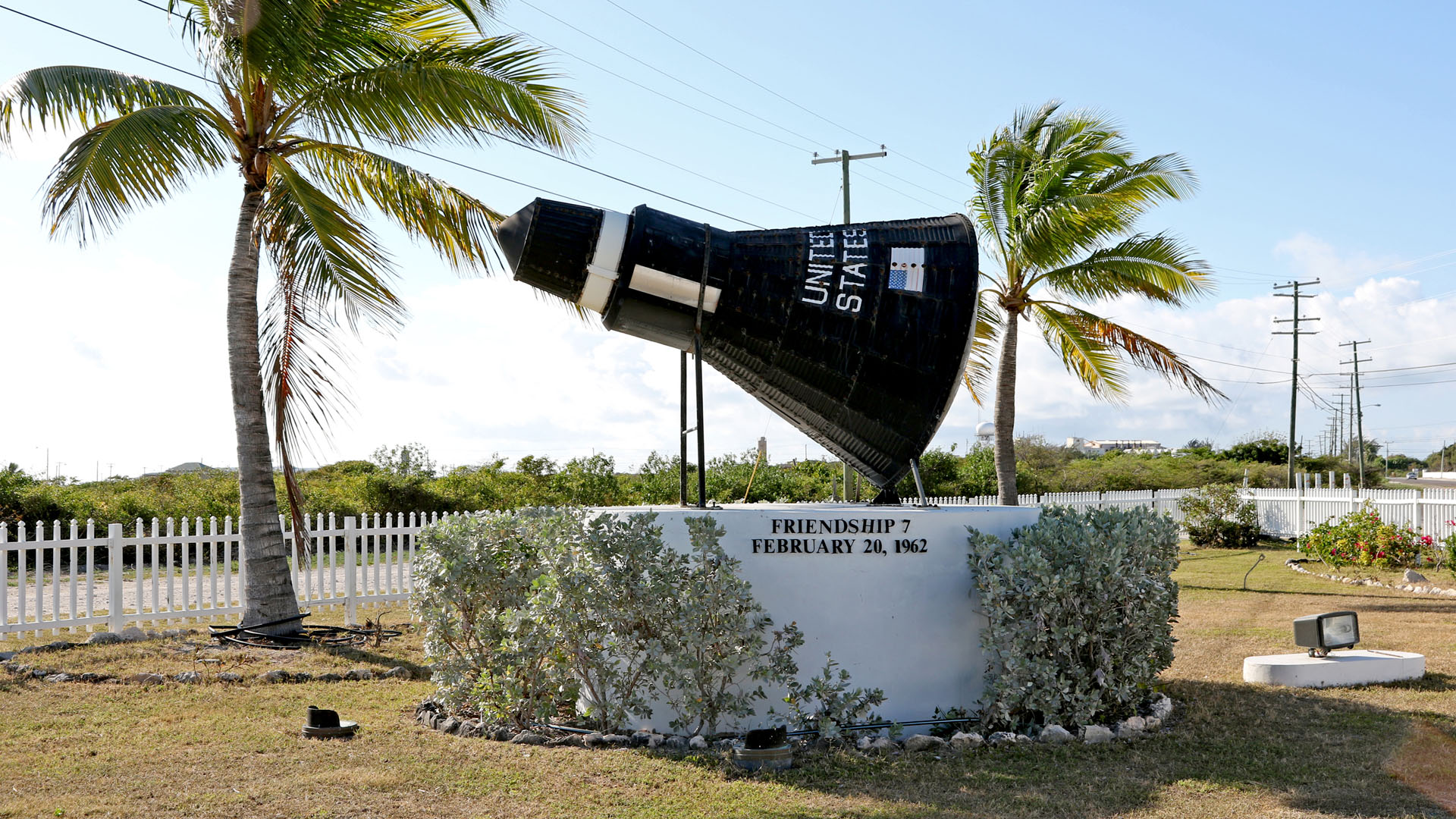
Replica of Friendship 7 at Grand Turk Airport

From 1950 to 1981, the United States had a missile tracking station on Grand Turk. In the early days of the American space program, NASA used it. After his three earth orbits in 1962, American astronaut John Glenn successfully landed in the nearby ocean and was brought back ashore to Grand Turk.

In 2025, the seventh flight test of SpaceX Starship exploded within sight of the islands, resulting in more than 230 airline flights needing to alter course or delay departure as a precaution against flying near falling debris, disrupting the travels of more than 40,000 people, and reports of damage on the ground, but official investigations revealed no injuries and only minor damage to one vehicle on the ground. The later eighth flight test had a similar outcome, disrupting about 240 flights according to the FAA. As in Starship's seventh flight test, debris was seen from the islands causing the government to issue an advisory, however according to the FAA there were no reports of injuries or damage on the ground.

== Postal system ==
There is no postal delivery in the Turks and Caicos; mail is picked up at one of four post offices on each of the major islands. Mail is transported three or seven times a week, depending on the destination. The Post Office is part of the territory's government and reports to the Minister of Government British support services.

== Media ==
Mobile phone service is provided by Cable & Wireless Communications, through its Flow brand, using GSM 850 and TDMA, and Digicel, using GSM 900 and 1900 and Islandcom Wireless, using 3G 850. Cable & Wireless provides CDMA mobile phone service in Providenciales and Grand Turk. The system is connected to the mainland by two submarine cables and an Intelsat earth station. There were three AM radio stations (one inactive) and six FM stations (no shortwave) in 1998. The most popular station is Power 92.5 FM which plays Top 100 hits. Over 8000 radio receivers are owned across the territory.

West Indies Video (WIV) has been the sole cable television provider for the Turks and Caicos Islands for over two decades and WIV4 (a subsidiary of WIV) has been the only broadcast station in the islands for over 15 years; broadcasts from the Bahamas can also be received. The territory has two internet service providers and its country code top-level domain (ccTLD) is ".tc". Amateur radio callsigns begin with "VP5" and visiting operators frequently work from the islands.

Turks and Caicos is served by the ARCOS-1 submarine cable, connecting the territory to the Dominican Republic to the south, to the Bahamas to the north and onto the US and countries in Central America.

WIV introduced Channel 4 News in 2002 broadcasting local news and infotainment programs across the country. Channel 4 was re-launched as WIV4 in November 2007.

In 2013 4NEWS became the islands' first high-definition cable news service with television studios in Grace Bay, Providenciales. DigicelPlay is the local cable provider.

Turks and Caicos's newspapers include the Turks and Caicos Weekly News, the Turks and Caicos Sun and the Turks and Caicos Free Press. All three publications are weekly. The Weekly News and the Sun both have supplement magazines. Other local magazines Times of the Islands, s3 Magazine, Real Life Magazine, Baller Magazine, and Unleashed Magazine.

== Sports ==
Cricket is the islands' national sport. The national team takes part in regional tournaments in the ICC Americas Championship, as well as having played one Twenty20 match as part of the 2008 Standford 20/20. Two domestic leagues exist, one on Grand Turk with three teams and another on Providenciales.

As of December 2020, the Turks and Caicos Islands' football team is ranked 203rd out of 210 teams in the FIFA World Rankings. Its highest ever ranking was 158th, achieved in 2008.

Because the territory is not recognised by the International Olympic Committee, Turks and Caicos Islanders compete for Great Britain at the Olympic Games. The islands compete in their own right at the Commonwealth Games.

== Notable people ==
=== Politics ===
- Nathaniel Francis (1912 – 2004 both in the Turks and Caicos Islands) was a politician who served as the island territory's acting Chief Minister from 28 March 1985 until 25 July 1986, when he was forced to resign after charges of corruption and patronage were levelled against him.
- Clement Howell (1935 in Blue Hills, Providenciales – 1987 near Nassau, Bahamas) was a politician who served on a four-member interim Advisory Council beginning in July 1986.
- James Alexander George Smith McCartney (1945 in Grand Turk – 1980 in New Jersey) also known as "Jags" McCartney was a politician who served as the island territory's first Chief Minister from August 1976 until 9 May 1980, when he died in a plane crash over New Jersey.
- Ariel Misick (born 1951) is a former minister of development and commerce. He served on a four-member interim Advisory Council from July 1986 to 3 March 1988.
- Michael Misick (born 1966 in Bottle Creek, North Caicos) is the former chief minister from 15 August 2003 to 9 August 2006 and was the first Premier from 9 August 2006 to 23 March 2009. He is on trial for conspiracy to receive bribes, conspiracy to defraud the government and money laundering.
- Washington Misick (born 1950 in the Turks and Caicos Islands) is a politician who serves as the current Premier and formerly as the Chief Minister from April 1991 to 31 January 1995.
- Norman B. Saunders (born 1943 in the Turks and Caicos Islands) is a former politician who served as the island territory's Chief Minister until March 1985, when he was arrested in Miami. In July 1985 he was sentenced to eight years in prison on conspiracy charges related to drug smuggling.
- Oswald Skippings (born 1953 in the Turks and Caicos Islands) is a politician who served as the island territory's Chief Minister from 19 June 1980 to November 1980 and again from 3 March 1988 to April 1991.

=== Sports ===
- Trevor Ariza (born 1985 in Miami) is an American professional basketball player. He is of Turks & Caicos Islands and Dominican descent through his parents, Lolita Ariza and Trevor Saunders of Grand Turk.
- Christopher Bryan (born 1960 in the Turks and Caicos Islands) is a former association football player. In 2006 he became the President of the Turks and Caicos Islands Football Association.
- Errion Charles (born 1965 in Saint Vincent) is a sportsman from the Turks and Caicos Islands who has represented his nation at both association football and cricket.
- Billy Forbes (born 1990 in Providenciales) is an association football player who currently plays for Valour FC. He holds the record for the most goals for the national team.
- Gavin Glinton (born 1979 in Grand Turk) is a footballer who last played for Nam Dinh FC.
- Delano Williams (born 1993 in Grand Turk) is a British sprinter. He trains with the Racers Track Club in Jamaica.

=== Celebrities ===
- LisaRaye McCoy (born 1967 in Chicago Illinois) is an American actress and former first lady of the Turks and Caicos Islands. McCoy married former chief turned premier Michael Misick back in April 2006. In 2008 LisaRaye released a statement that she and the premier were divorcing citing his corruption of governmental funds, infidelity and bribery. The divorce was finalized in 2010. She is also the half-sister of hip-hop rapper Da Brat.

== See also ==
- Index of Turks and Caicos Islands–related articles
- Outline of the Turks and Caicos Islands
