= Raymond Gardiner High School =

High school in Turks and Caicos

Coordinates: 21°52′55.8427″N 71°55′11.2329″W

Raymond Gardiner High School Playfield
- Interactive map of Raymond Gardiner High School Playfield
- Location: Bottle Creek, Turks and Caicos Islands
- Owner: Raymond Gardiner High School

Raymond E. Gardiner High School (RGHS) is a public high school in Bottle Creek, North Caicos, Turks and Caicos Islands.

It was established in 1973 as North Caicos Junior High School.

Raymond Gardiner High School Playfield is a multi-use sporting facility. It is currently used for athletics, soccer and rugby union competitions.
