= South Caicos =

Island in the Turks and Caicos Islands

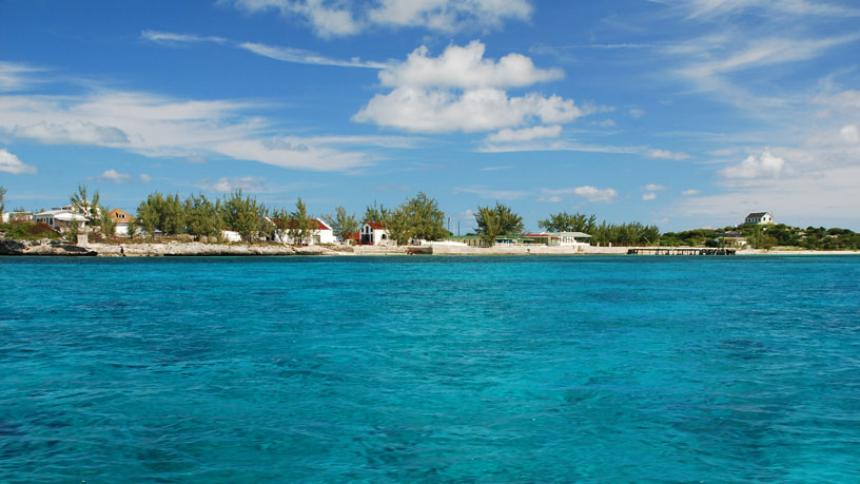
- The village of Cockburn Harbour on South Caicos

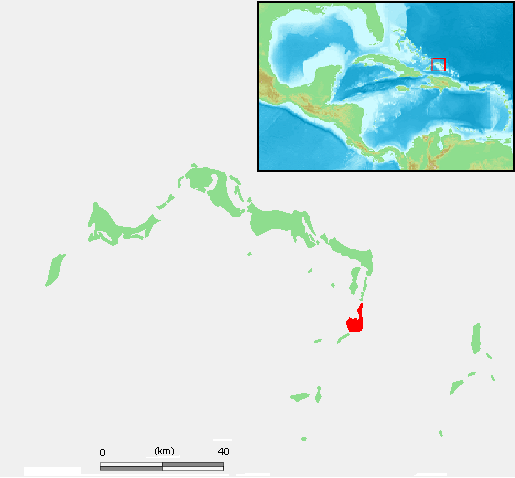
- Location of South Caicos within the Turks and Caicos Islands

- Location within Turks and Caicos Islands Location within the Caribbean

Geography
- Location: Atlantic Ocean
- Coordinates: 21°30′34″N 71°31′04″W
- Archipelago: Lucayan Archipelago

Administration
- United Kingdom
- British Overseas Territory: Turks and Caicos Islands

Demographics
- Population: 1,139 (2012)

Additional information
- Time zone: EST (UTC-5)
  - Summer (DST): EDT (UTC-4)
- ISO code: TC

South Caicos is the seventh-largest island in the Turks and Caicos archipelago, with a land area of 21.2 square kilometres (8.2 square miles). South Caicos is known for excellent fishing, both deep-sea and bone fishing, and scuba diving. South Caicos was formerly a salt exporter; the island still hosts a network of salt pans as a reminder of the industry. Today, the island's main income is derived from small-scale commercial fishing.

The School for Field Studies, a global nonprofit, accredited by the University of Minnesota, has established a well-regarded Center for Marine Resource Studies in Cockburn Harbour. The centre's research focuses on marine ecology and natural resource management. The island hosts an Annual South Caicos Regatta, a large celebration that features parties, boat races, and other games. The island has some real estate development, and tourism is a small, but growing, industry.

== Geography ==
The island is 22 miles (35 km) west of Grand Turk. Bell Sound is at the western side of the island, providing an important fishing site. Together with uninhabited East Caicos and a number of smaller islands, it forms the South Caicos and East Caicos District, with a total area of 136.8 square kilometres (53 square miles). All islands in the east and south of Caicos Bank belong to this district, except French Cay, which belongs to Providenciales and West Caicos. The larger ones of these islands are Hog Cay (7.9 km^{2} (3.1 sq mi)), McCartney Cay (3.5 km^{2} (1.4 sq mi)), Little Ambergris Cay (6.6 km^{2} (2.5 sq mi)), Big Ambergris Cay (4.3 km^{2} (1.7 sq mi)), and Long Cay (immediately south of South Caicos, 1.0 km^{2} (0.39 sq mi)). Between South Cacios and the Amgergris Cays are the Six Hill Cays (0.0914 km^{2} (0.0353 sq mi)) and the Fish Cays (0.1044 km^{2} (0.0403 sq mi)). South of the Ambergris Cays are Bush Cay (0.0814 km^{2} (0.0314 sq mi)), Pear Cay (0.0138 km^{2} (0.0053 sq mi)), Shot Cay (0.0004 km^{2} (0.00015 sq mi)), White Cay (0.0343 km^{2} (0.0132 sq mi)), South Rock, Whale Breaker, and Swimmer Rock (submerged), and southwest, West Sand Spit (submerged). The cays from Bush Cay to White Cay are the Seal Cays. South Rock is submerged, with a depth of less than 1.8 m (5.9 ft) above it.

== History ==
South Caicos may have been the second island sighted by Christopher Columbus. The original inhabitants of the island were Taíno and Lucayan Indians. In addition to a variety of archaeological treasures, they left behind the names of the islands in the form of the indigenous "Turk's head" cactus and the Lucayan term “caya hico” meaning string of islands named Caicos. The Lucayans disappeared roughly 30 years after his arrival, leaving the island sparsely populated and the salt industry booming.

The French and Spanish briefly captured the island in 1706 during which time it became a pirate haven. Until a fungus outbreak killed them off, sea-sponge farming briefly flourished on the island during the 1930s. The United States built an anti-submarine base on South Caicos in 1944, along with the first airstrip in the archipelago. During the 1950s a Canadian businessman attempted to start a conch shell export business on the island. In 1959 the U.S. returned to South Caicos when the Coast Guard constructed a LORAN (low-frequency radio signal navigation) station on the island. Today the island attracts tourists drawn to its unspoiled coral reefs.

== Airport ==
Norman B. Saunders International Airport

== Population ==
The population of South Caicos Island was estimated at 1,139 in 2012.

== Villages on South Caicos ==
- Out North
- The Flat
- Highlands

=== Cockburn Harbour ===
Named in 1840 after an official visit by a Governor of the Bahamas – Sir Francis Cockburn – Cockburn Harbour is the largest settlement on South Caicos Island and is home to some 900 year-round residents. Cockburn Harbour is known for having the best natural harbour in the Turks and Caicos Islands. Until the 1960s it was an important centre of regional trade and a major exporter of salt. Today its main industry is small-scale fishing focused on conch and spiny lobster exports. A variety of historic structures, including the Queen's Parade Grounds, an old Wesleyan Church, the 18th-century Commissioner's House, the old saltworks and the boiling hole that fed them can be found in the town. The abandoned salt pans just outside town have become the home of a number of bird species including large flocks of flamingos.

== Education ==
Iris Stubbs Primary School.

Marjorie Basden High School is in South Caicos.

== Images ==
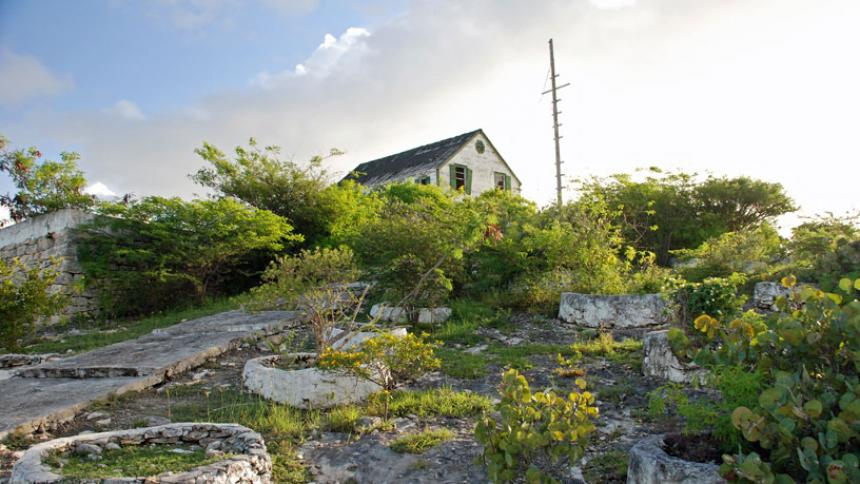
Historic Commissioner’s Mansion

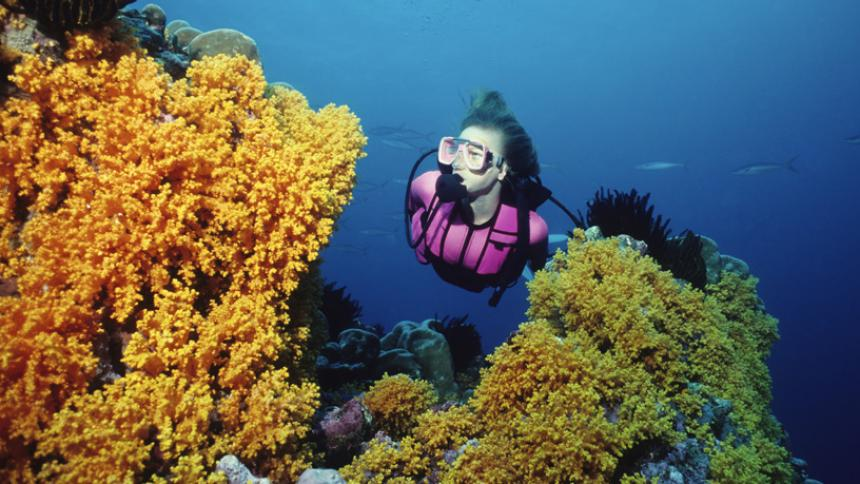
Scuba off South Caicos Island

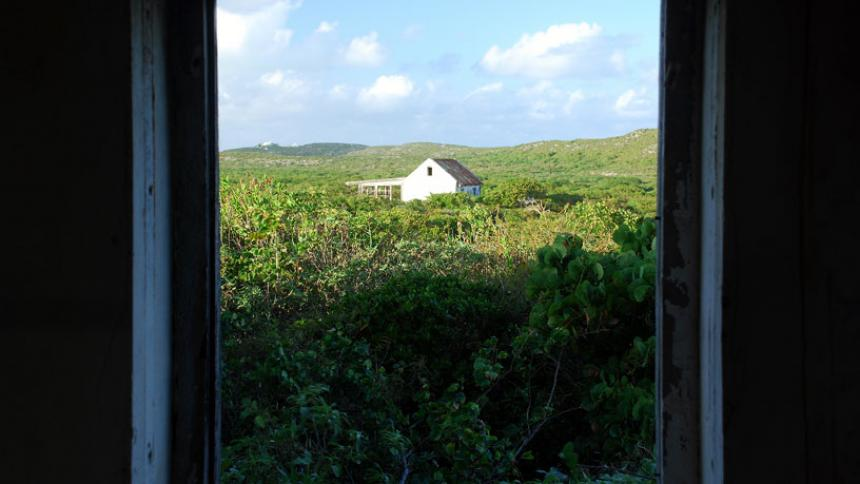
House on South Caicos Island

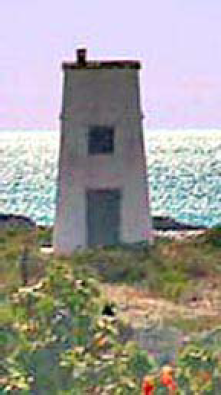
South Caicos Light House

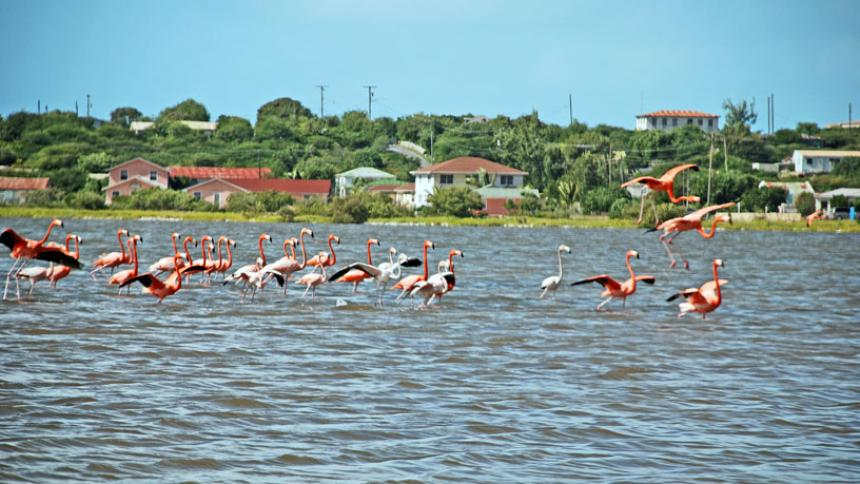
South Caicos Flamingos

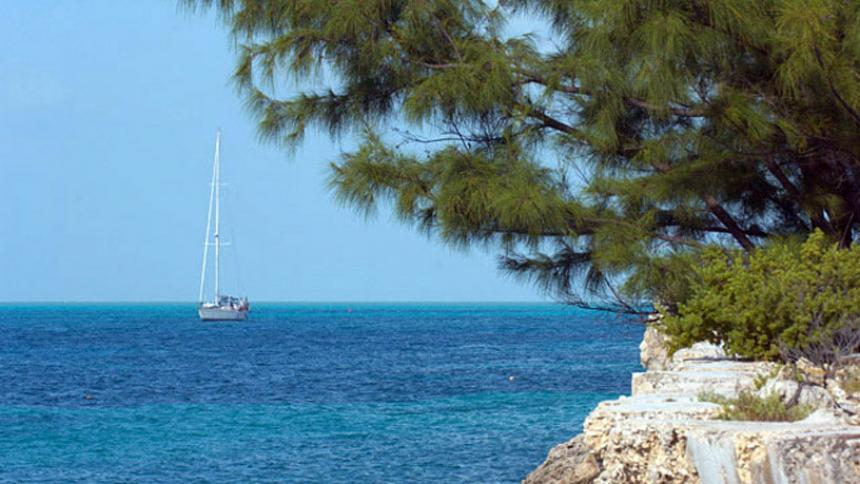
Sailing off South Caicos

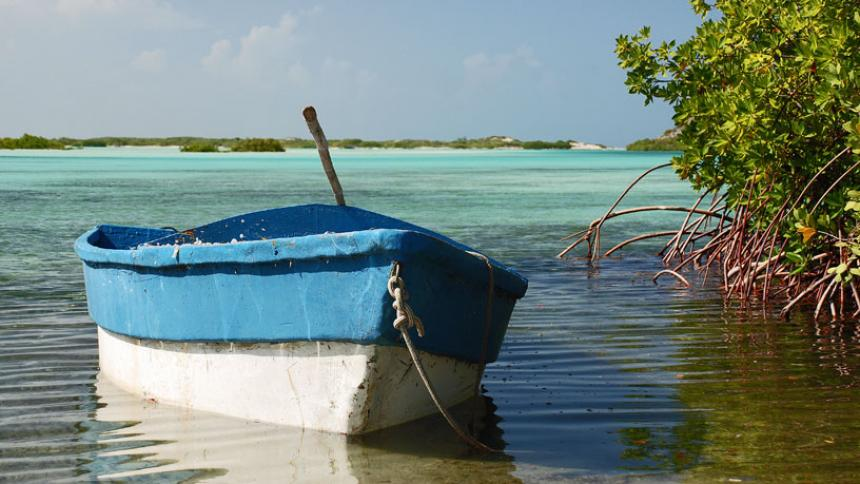
The Shore of South Caicos Island

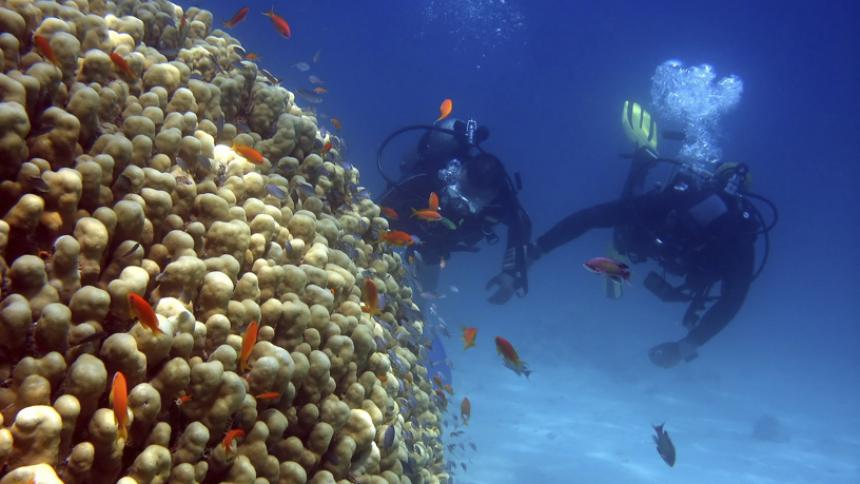
South Caicos Island’s Reefs

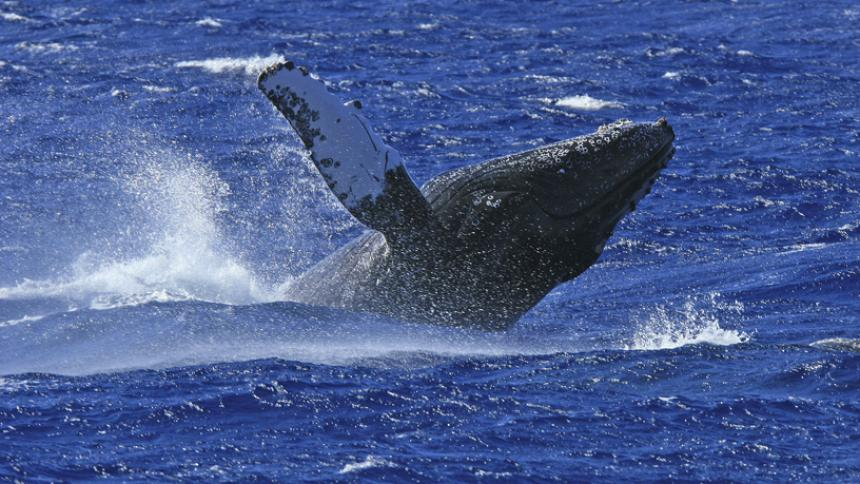
Humpback whale cresting off South Caicos Island
