= Cotton Cay =

Island in the Turks and Caicos Islands

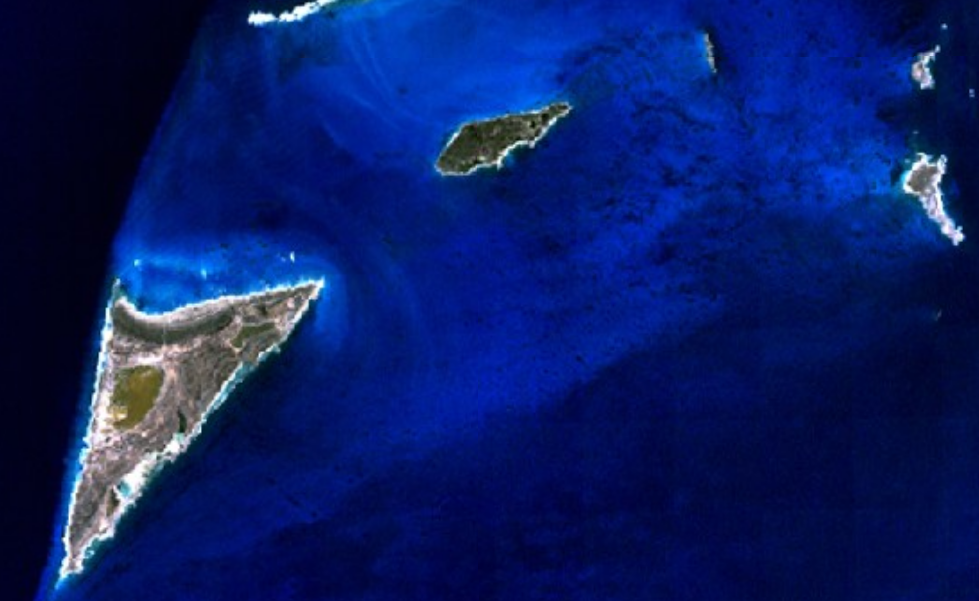
- Satellite image of Cotton Cay (center)

- Location of Cotton Cay within the Turks and Caicos Islands

Geography
- Location: Atlantic Ocean
- Coordinates: 21°21′50″N 71°09′17″W
- Archipelago: Turks and Caicos Islands
- Area: 1.13 km^{2} (0.44 sq mi)
- Length: 2.35 km (1.46 mi)
- Width: 0.6 km (0.37 mi)
- Highest elevation: 6 m (20 ft)

Demographics
- Population: 0

Cotton Cay is an uninhabited island located in the Turks and Caicos Islands, about 2.7 km (1.7 mi) northeast of Salt Cay.

The island is oblong in shape, generally of low elevation, and has a low density coastal vegetation. It covers an area of about 1.13 km^{2} (0.44 mi^{2}). Plantation ruins and field walls can be seen on the western half of the island, indicating that cotton and sisal were once raised here. Echinocactus horizonthalonius (Turk's Head cactuses), which are uncommon on the main islands in the country, are well-established on Cotton Cay.
