= East Caicos =

Island in the Turks and Caicos Islands

- Location of East Caicos within the Turks and Caicos Islands

- Location within Turks and Caicos Islands Location within the Caribbean

Geography
- Location: Atlantic Ocean
- Coordinates: 21°42′09″N 71°29′53″W
- Archipelago: Lucayan Archipelago

Administration
- United Kingdom; Turks and Caicos Islands
- British Overseas Territory: Turks and Caicos Islands

Additional information
- Time zone: EST (UTC-5)
  - Summer (DST): EDT (UTC-4)
- ISO code: TC

Ramsar Wetland
- Official name: North, Middle & East Caicos Islands
- Designated: 27 June 1990
- Reference no.: 493

East Caicos is the fourth-largest island in the Turks and Caicos Islands. To the west, it is separated from Middle Caicos by Lorimer Creek, a narrow passage that can accommodate only small boats. To the south is South Caicos. East Caicos has no inhabitants.

== Geography ==
East Caicos belongs to the South Caicos and East Caicos District. It has an area of 90.6 square kilometres (35 sq mi) within the high water mark, and of 182 km^{2} (70 sq mi) within the shoreline. The difference between the two values is not accounted for as land area. The island is covered by ponds, lakes, swamps and mangroves, and is inhabited by flamingos, wild ducks and pigeons.

The highest point in the Turks and Caicos Archipelago is East Caicos’s Flamingo Hill with an elevation of 156 feet (48 m). Savannas stretch across the island's north side. The northwest of the island hosts a cave system that was once used to mine bat guano. Petroglyphs found there are evidence of the island's earliest settlers.

== History ==
The island was populated by the Lucayan people and the Taíno 500 years ago, who called it Wana 'Small Country'.

The island was once the home of a 19th-century sisal plantation and a thriving cattle industry, East Caicos Island is currently uninhabited. The cave petroglyphs, the ruins of the town of Jacksonville and the abandoned railway are the only remnants of its former inhabitants. In 2004 a marine archaeology expedition found the wreckage of a ship off the island. Both the Esperanza and Trouvadore, illegal Spanish slavers, went down in this area, in 1837 and 1841, respectively. 192 captive Africans survived the Trouvadore sinking and were helped by British colonists to resettle as free persons, mostly on Grand Turk Island, with 24 taken to Nassau.
