= Parrot Cay =

Island in Turks and Caicos Islands

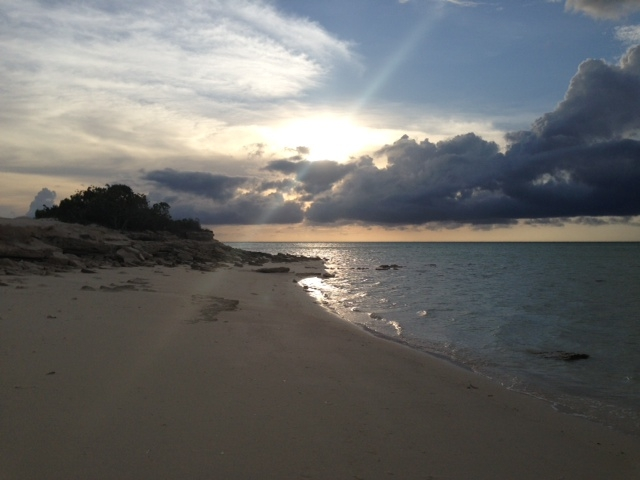
- Sunset at Parrot Cay

- Location of Parrot Cay within the Turks and Caicos Islands

- Location within Turks and Caicos Islands Location within the Caribbean

Geography
- Location: Atlantic Ocean
- Coordinates: 21°55′56″N 72°03′29″W
- Archipelago: Lucayan Archipelago

Administration
- United Kingdom
- British Overseas Territory: Turks and Caicos Islands

Demographics
- Population: 131 (2012)

Additional information
- Time zone: EST (UTC-5)
  - Summer (DST): EDT (UTC-4)
- ISO code: TC

Parrot Cay is an island in the Turks and Caicos Islands. The island contains about 1,000 acres (405 ha) of land, a mile-long beach and features a high-end beach resort with 61 rooms. Parrot Cay became a private island resort in 1998. It is located about 575 miles (925 km) south east of Miami, and can be reached by a 35-minute boat ride from Providenciales, the main island in Turks and Caicos.

== History ==
Parrot Cay was originally created by a Kuwaiti family in 1988, who built the large structure that now functions as the resort's main building. The Gulf War affected the finances of this family, and it remained empty until it was bought over and remade into a resort in 1998 by Singaporean hotelier Christina Ong for her COMO Hotels and Resorts group. It is said that her daughter Melissa Ong discovered the island during a diving trip.

In more recent times, Parrot Cay has become a luxury travel destination, featuring on the AWE network's Private Islands. Parrot Cay's main resort contains 61 rooms, including beach houses and villas. Two restaurants are located on the island: the south-east Asian inspired Lotus and the Italian-Mediterranean Terrace. In addition to the resort's rooms, there is a collection of private villas and beach houses located a short distance from the resort in a location called Rocky Point. Prices for villas start at US$10 million, while the beach houses start at US$5 million. Owners of private homes in Parrot Cay include Keith Richards, Donna Karan and Bruce Willis. Bruce Willis sold his home in 2019. Richards has been quoted as saying that he would relocate his family to his Parrot Cay retreat if he knew his death was coming, and just "hang out".

== Popular culture ==
Because of its secluded location and the privacy it provides, Parrot Cay has become very popular with many celebrities. Guests have included Paul McCartney, Justin Timberlake, Barbra Streisand, Penélope Cruz, Julia Roberts and Phil Collins, and it has also hosted the wedding of Ben Affleck and Jennifer Garner in 2005, and Bruce Willis and Emma Heming in 2009.
