= North Caicos =

Island in the Turks and Caicos Islands

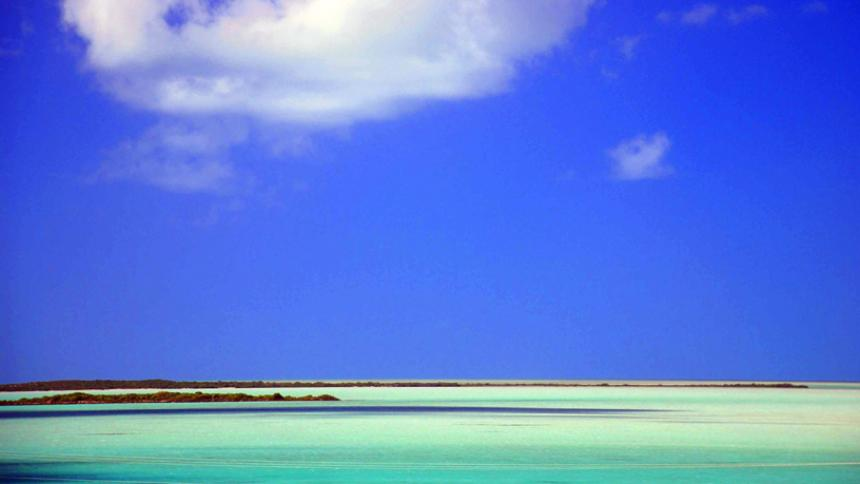
- North Caicos Shore

- Location of North Caicos within the Turks and Caicos Islands

- Location within Turks and Caicos Islands Location within the Caribbean

Geography
- Location: Atlantic Ocean
- Coordinates: 21°53′29″N 71°56′46″W
- Archipelago: Lucayan Archipelago
- Area: 116.4 km^{2} (44.9 sq mi)

Administration
- United Kingdom
- British Overseas Territory: Turks and Caicos Islands

Demographics
- Population: 1,312 (2012 census)

Additional information
- Time zone: EST (UTC-5)
  - Summer (DST): EDT (UTC-4)
- ISO code: TC

Ramsar Wetland
- Official name: North, Middle & East Caicos Islands
- Designated: 27 June 1990
- Reference no.: 493

North Caicos is the second-largest island in the Turks and Caicos Islands (after Middle Caicos). To the west, the Caicos Cays (the closest is Parrot Cay) link to Providenciales. To the east, it is separated from Middle Caicos by Juniper Hole, a narrow passage that can accommodate only small boats. A 1600-m (1-mile) causeway connects North Caicos to Middle Caicos.

== Geography ==
North Caicos has an area of 116.4 km^{2} within the high water mark, and of 207.1 km^{2} within the shoreline. The difference between the two values is not accounted for as land area. Sights on or near the island include Cottage Pond, Wade's Green Plantation, Flamingo Pond Overlook, and the tiny Three Marys Cays (0.64 ha) approximately 20 metres off the northwestern shore. North Caicos is 19 km (12 miles) from Providenciales, which offers daily ferry trips to the island.

Together with Parrot Cay (4.9 km^{2}), and Bay Cay off the eastern shore (at 12.9 km^{2} the sixth-largest island of the territory) and a few more uninhabited offshore cays, it forms the North Caicos District, with an area of 144.9 km^{2}.

== Population ==
The population was 1,312 at the 2012 census.

== North Caicos Towns ==
=== Bottle Creek ===
With a population of 907 people, Bottle Creek is the island's main village. It is also the district capital and the home of the island's various government offices, its utility companies and its high school. There are a number of old plantation areas situated along the King's Road between Bottle Creek and the causeway to Middle Caicos.

=== Whitby ===
Located between the protected snorkeling area of Three Mary Cays and Horsestable Beach, Whitby is a small seaside village on North Caicos' northern shore.

=== Kew ===
This inland village is one of the oldest towns in the Turks and Caicos. It is known for being the centre of the archipelago's farming community. Kew is also the home of the Wades Green Plantation, a historic tourist site. The village has a population of 234.

=== Sandy Point ===
This tiny village is located at the northwestern tip of the island facing Parrot Cay. It hosts the North Caicos Yacht Club. It is the location of Sandy Point Marina, where ferry services from Providenciales arrive and a population of 23.

== Education ==
Raymond Gardiner High School is in Bottle Creek, North Caicos.

== Images ==
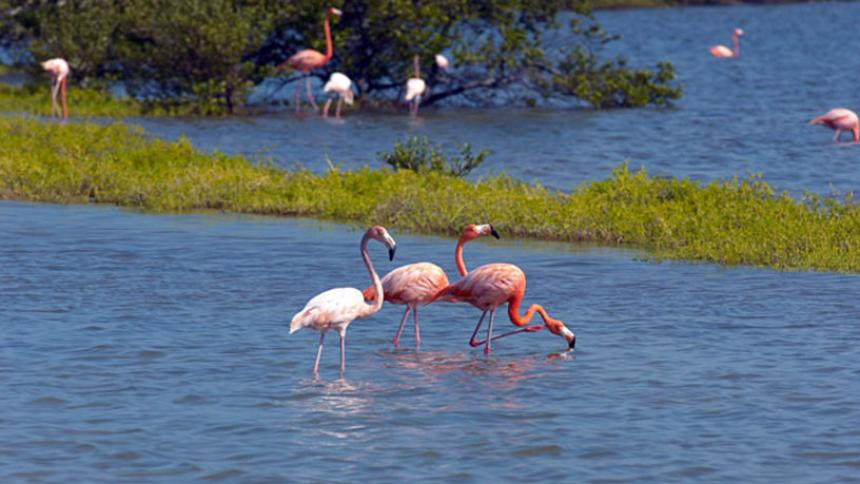
Flamingos on North Caicos

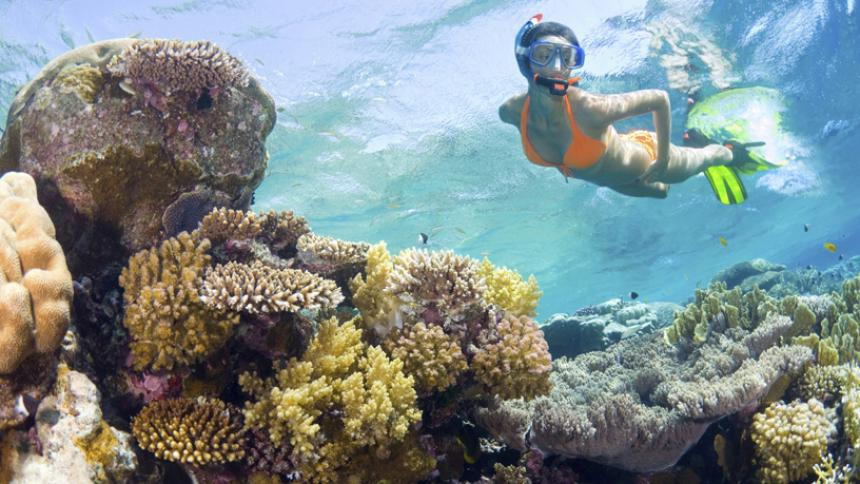
Snorkeling off North Caicos

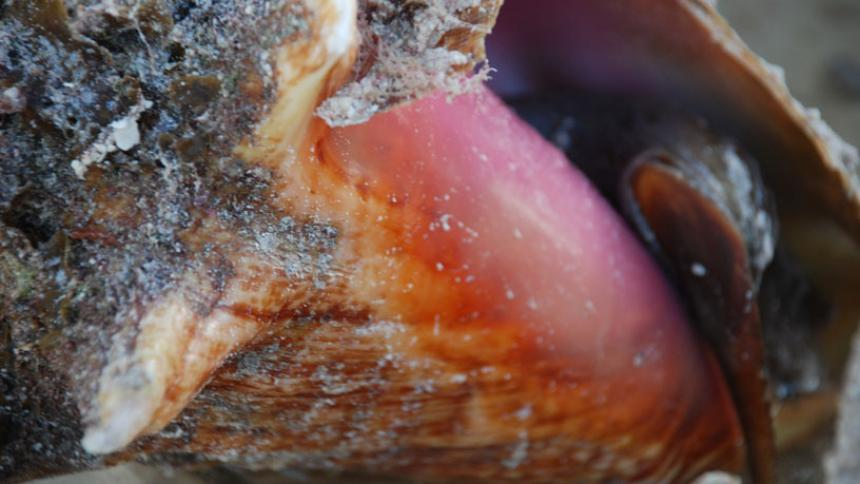
Conch Caught off North Caicos

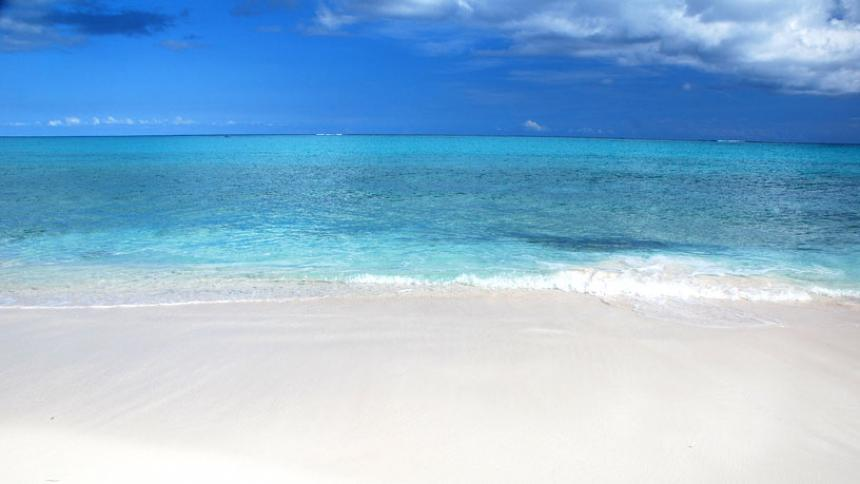
The Beaches of North Caicos
