= West Caicos =

Island in the Turks and Caicos Islands

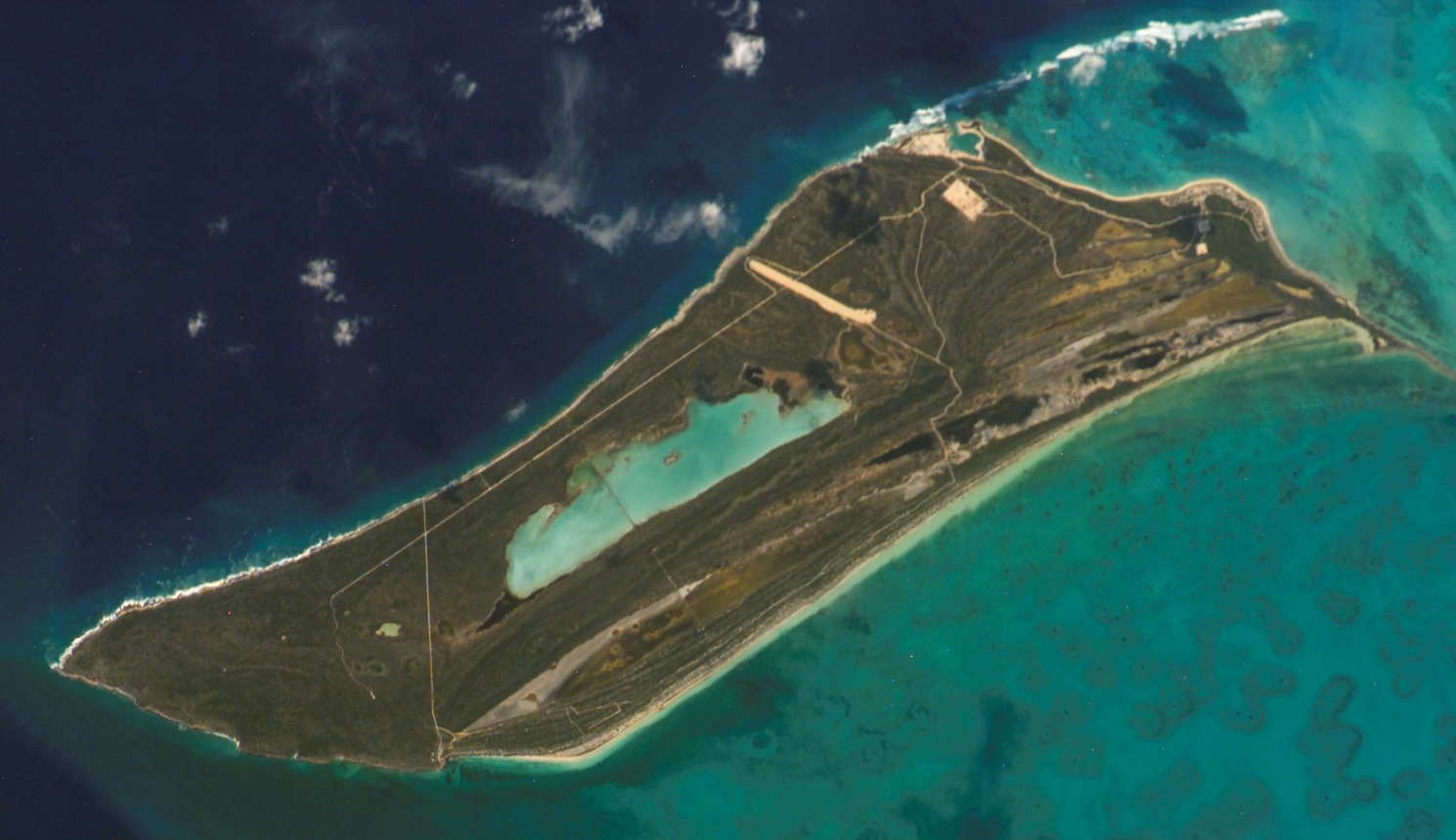
- View from the ISS, north is to the upper right corner

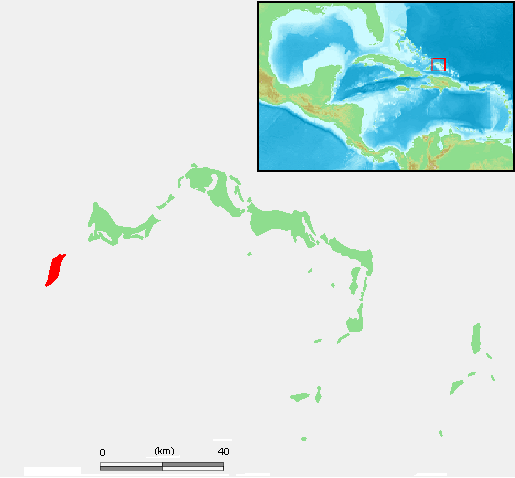
- Location of West Caicos within the Turks and Caicos Islands

- Location within Turks and Caicos Islands Location within the Caribbean

Geography
- Location: Atlantic Ocean
- Coordinates: 21°40′00″N 72°27′30″W
- Archipelago: Lucayan Archipelago

Administration
- United Kingdom; Turks and Caicos Islands
- British Overseas Territory: Turks and Caicos Islands

Additional information
- Time zone: EST (UTC-5)
  - Summer (DST): EDT (UTC-4)
- ISO code: TC

West Caicos is an island in the Turks and Caicos Islands southwest of Providenciales. West Caicos has an area of 11 square miles (28 km^{2}), and has been uninhabited for over a century.

== Geography ==
The island is home to the 500 acres (2 km^{2}) Lake Catherine, a protected wildlife reserve, filled with pink roseate flamingoes, turtles and other indigenous wildlife.

Lake Catherine is connected to the sea through underground passages. Tides in the sea create upsurge in Lake Catherine, which is visible as "boiling" above the cave mouths on lake bed. The largest such cave mouth is Boiling Hole.

The ocean off the west coast quickly drops off to over 7,000 ft (2,100 m). Different sea creatures live in these depths, from sea turtles, spotted eagle rays, gray nurse and reef sharks to humpback whales.

== History ==
In the 1890s, West Caicos was cleared for sisal plantations, which was a major crop of the Turks and Caicos Islands. On the island are the ruins of Yankee Town, which was the centre of industry on the island. Remains of a railroad still exist.

At least two attempts have been made to purchase the entire island: The first was made by Dominican dictator Rafael Leónidas Trujillo whose intent was to use it as a hideaway; however, he was assassinated before the purchase was made. The second occurred in 1972 when an oil company tried to purchase the island to build a refinery; though the deal was never made, the airstrip built by the company during the attempted purchase remains to this day.

A new effort appears to be well underway to develop the island into a private high-end resort reserve, billing itself as 'West Caicos Reserve'. This effort is apparently targeted toward high-net-worth individuals, as it is integrated with an exclusive 125 room Ritz-Carlton Resort/Spa and Marina. The anticipated opening of this community was to be mid-2008. However, due to the collapse of Lehman Brothers, the financiers of the project, all construction work was halted in September 2008.

In 2022 it emerged that Decimus Real Estate, a UK-based company, was reviving the high-end resort project, now simply called "West". The investment portfolios of Russian billionaire Roman Abramovich is tied to Decimus, lending some uncertainty as to whether the project will continue to go ahead, since Abramovich is under international sanctions.
