= Oswald Skippings =

Turks and Caicos Islander politician

2nd Chief Minister of the Turks and Caicos Islands
- In office 3 March 1988 – 3 April 1991
- Monarch: Elizabeth II
- Governor: Michael J. Bradley
- Preceded by: Nathaniel Francis
- Succeeded by: Washington Misick
- In office 19 June 1980 – 4 November 1980
- Monarch: Elizabeth II
- Governor: John Clifford Strong
- Preceded by: James Alexander George Smith McCartney
- Succeeded by: Norman Saunders

Personal details
- Born: Oswald O'Neil Skippings; 19 February 1953 (age 73) Grand Turk Island, Turks and Caicos Islands
- Party: People's Democratic Movement
- Other political affiliations: Progressive Democratic Alliance (2016–2020)

Oswald O'Neil Skippings (born 19 February 1953) is a Turks and Caicos politician who served as the 2nd Chief Minister of the Turks and Caicos Islands from 19 June 1980 to 4 November 1980, and from 3 March 1988 to 3 April 1991. He was a minister in the government of James Alexander George Smith McCartney. He was deemed unfit to hold office by Governor Christopher J. Turner in 1986.

== Early life ==
Oswald Skippings was born on Grand Turk Island on 19 February 1953. He graduated from Mico University College with a teaching degree and worked as a teacher. He attended the University of the West Indies, but dropped out.

== Career ==
=== Early politics ===
The People's Democratic Movement (PDM) was formed, with Skippings as one of its founding members, in 1975. Skippings won a seat in the legislature in the 1976 election. In James Alexander George Smith McCartney's first ministerial government Skippings was Minister of Health and Education and Deputy Chief Minister.

=== Chief Minister ===
McCartney died in a plane crash 1980, and Skippings served as acting chief minister from May to November before losing the 1980 election to Norman Saunders. Saunders defeated Skippings in the 1984 election.

Saunders and two legislators were arrested for drug charges on 5 March 1985. Skippings advocating for a revolution to overthrow the government on 5 March 1986. Direct rule from the United Kingdom was established in 1986 in response to corruption in the Turks and Caicos. Governor Christopher J. Turner removed Skipping, Lewis Astwood, and Nathaniel Francis as unfit for office on 24 July.

The PDM under the leadership of Skippings won eleven seats in the 1988 election. In his second government, Skippings served as the minister for tourism, communications, and transportation. An early election was called by Skippings in 1991, but Washington Misick and the Progressive National Party won.

Skippings is currently the youngest person to serve in the legislature and as chief minister.

=== Later politics ===
Skippings left politics in 2005 stating that he was no longer useful, but returned to politics in 2007 as he believed the country was heading towards economic disaster.

Skippings unsuccessfully ran for leader of the PDM against Floyd Seymour and Douglas Parnell. In 2012, he defeated Derek Hugh Taylor to become leader of the PDM. PDM narrowly lost the 2012 election by one seat. Skippings resigned as leader and formed the Progressive Democratic Alliance in January 2015. He returned to the PDM in 2020, and was elected chair of the PDM branch in Grand Turk.

== Political positions ==
Skippings supported a political association between Canada and the Turks and Caicos Islands in the 1980s.

== Personal life ==
Skippings is the father of five children.

== Works cited ==
=== News ===
- "Face to Face: Oswald Skippings". Turks and Caicos Weekly News. 17 September 2012. Archived from the original on 11 May 2026.
- "Oswald Skippings returns to his roots -says change in leadership led him back". Turks and Caicos Weekly News. 22 September 2023. Archived from the original on 11 May 2026.
- "Fired Caribbean Minister Blames U.S. for Dismissal". Albuquerque Journal. 26 July 1986. p. C12 – via Newspapers.com.
- "PDM elects a new leader". Turks and Caicos News Now. 2 July 2012. Archived from the original on 3 July 2012.
- "Turks". Miami Herald. 20 February 1977. p. 28 – via Newspapers.com.
- Bird, Rebecca (22 October 2007). "Ex-chief minister Skippings returns to politics". Turks and Caicos Weekly News. Archived from the original on 11 May 2026.
- Cartwright-Robinson, Sharlene (22 April 2024). "Passing the Baton". Turks and Caicos Sun. Archived from the original on 11 May 2026.
- Hamaludin, Mohamed (8 March 1985). "Drug connection of islands has never been a big secret". The Sault Star. p. B13 – via Newspapers.com.
- Mills, Carlton (5 May 2026). "The Blom Cooper Report 1986 - A Period of Turbulence in the Turks and Caicos Islands: 1985-1986". Turks and Caicos Sun. Archived from the original on 11 May 2026.
- Reid, Susan (6 May 1988). "New hope seen for link with Turks, Caicos". Toronto Star. p. A16 – via Newspapers.com.

=== Web ===
- "Hon. Oswald Skippings". Turks and Caicos Islands. Archived from the original on 11 May 2026.
- "Turks and Caicos Islands Commission of Inquiry 1986" (PDF). Foreign Secretary. 1986. Archived (PDF) from the original on 11 May 2026.

Political offices
Preceded by James Alexander George Smith McCartney	Chief Minister of the Turks and Caicos Islands; 1980	Succeeded by Norman Saunders
Vacant Office suspended 1986–1988 Title last held by Nathaniel Francis	Chief Minister of the Turks and Caicos Islands; 1988–1991	Succeeded by Washington Misick
