= 1988 Turks and Caicos Islands general election =

1988 Turks and Caicos Islands General Election
- March 3, 1988

13 seats in the Legislative Council 7 seats needed for a majority
- Registered: Needed
- Turnout: Needed
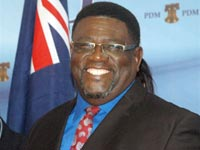

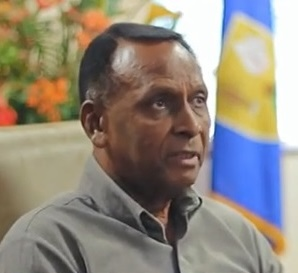
	First party	Second party	Third party
Leader	Oswald Skippings	Daniel Malcolm	Ariel Misick
Party	People's Democratic Movement	Progressive National Party	National Democratic Alliance
Leader's seat	Grand Turk South & Salt Cay	Grand Turk North	Grand Turk North
Seats won	11	2	0
Seat change	▲8	▼6	No change
Popular vote	5,495	2,727	973
Percentage	59.8%	29.7%	10.6%
Chief Minister before election
Nathaniel Francis
Progressive National Party
Chief Minister after Election
Oswald Skippings
People's Democratic Movement

General elections were held in the Turks and Caicos Islands on 3 March 1988. They were the first after the suspension of the islands' constitution between 1986 and 1988, which followed Chief Minister Norman Saunders leaving office in March 1985 after being arrested on suspicion of drug smuggling (he was later found guilty and jailed) and the next Chief Minister Nathaniel Francis resigning in July 1986 after a British parliamentary inquiry accused him of corruption.

The result was a victory for the opposition People's Democratic Movement (PDM), which won eleven of the thirteen seats in the Legislative Council. Following the elections, PDM leader Oswald Skippings became Chief Minister. Daniel Malcolm, leader of the Progressive National Party (PNP) and Ariel Misick, leader of the National Democratic Alliance (NDA) both lost their seats.

== Electoral system ==
The thirteen members of the Legislative Council were elected from five multi-member constituencies with two or three seats. The number of seats was increased from 11 in 1984.

== Campaign ==
A total of 39 candidates contested the elections, with the PDM, PNP and NDA all running full slates of 13 candidates.

== Results ==
Party	Votes	%	Seats	+/–
People's Democratic Movement	5,495	59.76	11	+8
Progressive National Party	2,727	29.66	2	–6
National Democratic Alliance	973	10.58	0	New
Total	9,195	100.00	13	+2
Registered voters/turnout	4,346	–		
Source: Caribbean Elections
