= James Alexander George Smith McCartney =

1st Chief Minister of the Turks and Caicos Islands

1st Chief Minister of the Turks and Caicos Islands
- In office 31 August 1976 – 9 May 1980
- Monarch: Elizabeth II
- Governor: Arthur Christopher Watson; John Clifford Strong
- Succeeded by: Oswald Skippings

1st National Hero of the Turks and Caicos Islands

Personal details
- Born: 30 June 1945 Grand Turk, Turks and Caicos Islands
- Died: 9 May 1980 (aged 34) near Vineland, New Jersey, United States
- Party: People's Democratic Movement
- Spouse: Dorothy M. McCartney

James Alexander George Smith McCartney (30 June 1945 – 9 May 1980), also known as J. A. G. S. McCartney or "Jags" McCartney, was a politician from the Turks and Caicos Islands. He was the first Chief Minister of the Turks and Caicos Islands and held that position from 31 August 1976 until 9 May 1980, when he died when the private plane he was in crashed near Vineland, New Jersey, while flying from Washington, D.C. to Atlantic City, New Jersey.

McCartney was born in Grand Turk to an accomplished Jamaican barrister, Harvey O. B. Fernandez McCartney and a Sunday school pianist, Sally McCartney, née Taylor of the Turks and Caicos. He was named after a prominent Jamaican barrister and distinguished legislator, James Alexander George Smith (1877–1942).

J.A.G.S. McCartney was the first leader and founder of the People's Democratic Movement (PDM), a grassroots organization established to address the many social and economic ills that had been pervasive throughout the Turks and Caicos Islands. A central goal of his was the attainment of self-determination for the people of the Turks and Caicos Islands. McCartney had particularly sought to mobilize the youth in the political process. A charismatic, dynamic and visionary figure, McCartney was determined to usher in a new constitution that would foster and safeguard the rights of all Turks and Caicos Islanders, create new opportunities for citizens and advance the country. Assuming office at age 31, McCartney remains one of the world's youngest democratically elected leaders in history. After his death, his deputy Oswald Skippings became Chief Minister at the age of 26.

National Heroes Day, a holiday celebrated on the last Monday in May, commemorates the life of McCartney. This holiday was later renamed to JAGs McCartney Day in 2020. Additionally, the Grand Turk International Airport is named in honour of him. North of the airport on Airport Road is the JAGS McCartney Memorial Park, with a covered pavilion with histories and tributes about him. This is located at N 21 27.081 and W 71 8.619. There is a large open park just south of the pavilion.

Political offices
| Preceded by Office established | Chief Minister of the Turks and Caicos Islands; 1976–1980 | Succeeded by Oswald Skippings |
