= Misick =

Misick is a surname. Notable people with the surname include:

- Ariel Misick (born 1951), Turks and Caicos Islands politician
- Emmanuel Misick, Turks and Caicos Islands politician
- Michael Misick (born 1966), Premier of the Turks and Caicos Islands
- Washington Misick (born 1950), Premier of the Turks and Caicos Islands

== See also ==
- Gladys Carlyon De Courcy Misick Morrell (1888–1969), Bermudian suffragette leader
- Missick
