= Peter Gautrey =

British diplomat

Dato Laila Utama Captain Peter Gautrey CMG CVO DK
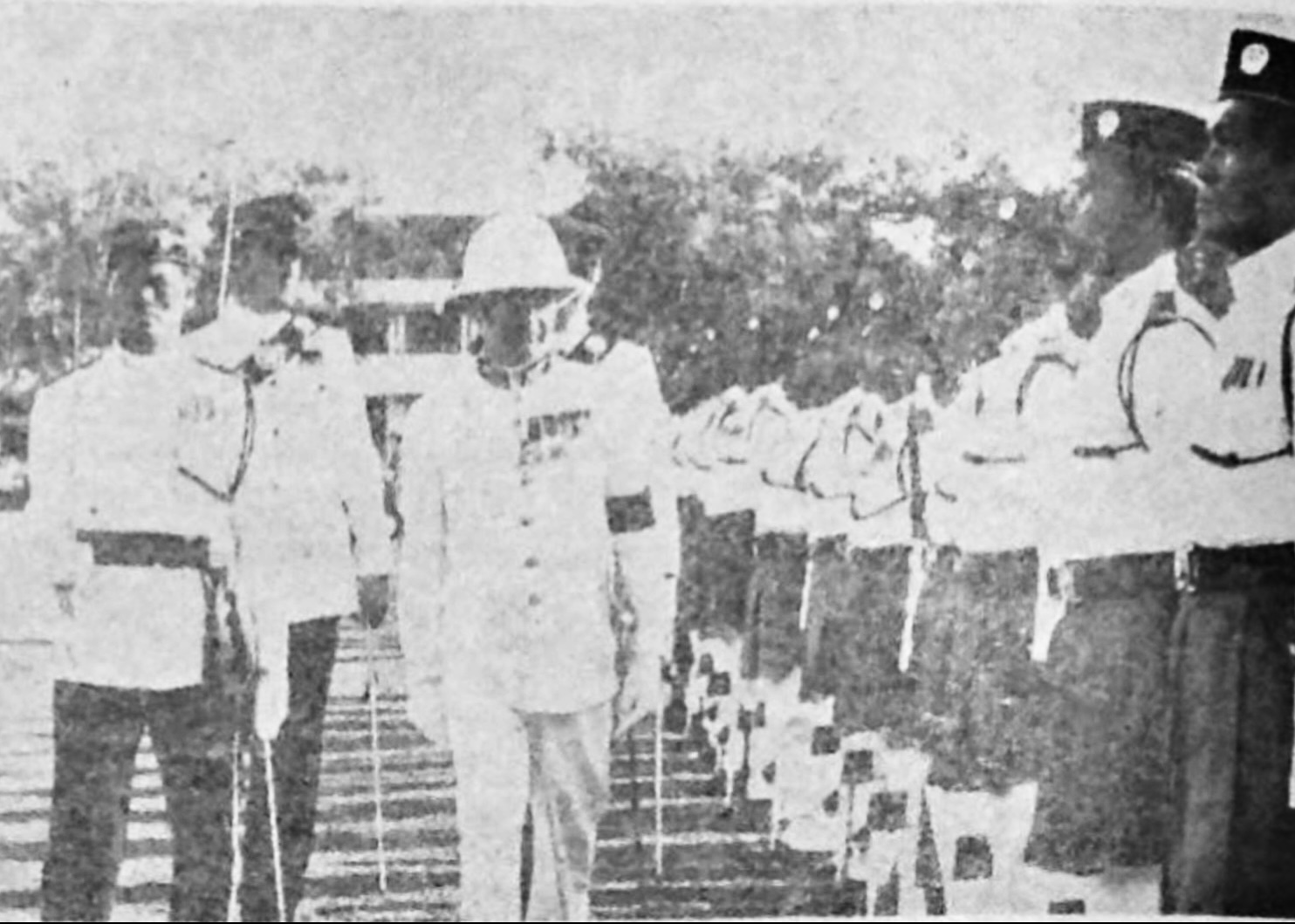
- Gautrey inspecting the Brunei honour guard for the Queen's Birthday in 1972

4th British High Commissioner to Guyana
- In office March 1975 – 1978
- Monarch: Elizabeth II
- Preceded by: William Bates
- Succeeded by: Philip Mallet

6th British High Commissioner to Brunei
- In office 12 January 1972 – 14 January 1975
- Preceded by: Arthur Adair
- Succeeded by: James Davidson

British High Commissioner to Swaziland
- In office 2 September 1968 – January 1972
- Preceded by: Office established
- Succeeded by: Eric Tocq

Personal details
- Born: 17 September 1918 Portsmouth, Hampshire, England
- Died: 7 February 2014 (aged 95)
- Occupation: Military officer and diplomat

Military service
- Branch/service: British Army
- Years of service: 1941–1946
- Rank: Captain
- Unit: Royal Horse Artillery
- Battles/wars: World War II

Captain Peter Gautrey (17 September 1918 – 7 February 2014), sometimes referred to as Dato Utama Peter Gautrey, was a diplomat and formerly the British High Commissioner to Brunei, Swaziland and Guyana.

== Early life ==
Gautrey was born in Portsmouth, Hampshire and educated at Abbotsholme School from 1931 to 1935. On 18 March 1936, he began work as a clerical officer in the Home Office and later Executive officer on 1 July 1942. Amid the outbreak of the Second World War, he enlisted into the XII Brigade, Royal Horse Artillery (RHA) on 20 October 1939. He was commissioned on 10 May 1941 and later promoted to the rank of Captain in 1945. He served in India and Burma from April 1942 to October 1945. On 30 April 1946, he was released from service.

On 1 September 1947, he became a Higher Executive Officer, Assistant Principal at the Commonwealth Relations Office on 19 January 1948, Private Secretary to Permanent Under-Secretary of State from 26 September to 31 December 1948, became a Principal on 1 January 1949, First Secretary at United Kingdom Embassy in Dublin from October 1950 to April 1953, Delhi from September 1955 to September 1957, member of United Kingdom Delegation to UNESCO in 1956, and Assistant secretary on 1 May 1961. That same year, he began work in the West Africa Department of the Commonwealth Office, and as the Counsellor within the British High Commission in India until March 1963. He would then be promoted to Deputy High Commissioner of that same place until 1965. He became an Inspector from 1965 to 1968.

== Diplomatic career ==
Gautrey's diplomatic career began after being appointed as the High Commissioner to Swaziland from 2 September 1968 to 1971. On 12 January 1972, he was appointed as the high commissioner in Brunei in which he will hold until 1975. Him together with his wife arrived at Berakas Airport at 16:40 on 17 January, and were welcomed by Isa Ibrahim. On 14 January 1974, he returned to Brunei after going on a vacation, with Deputy High Commissioner J.W. Moffatt taking over. On 16 January 1975, a celebration was held at Istana Darul Hana in conjunction to the completion of his three years service to Brunei. He departed Brunei afterwards on that same day. His successor, James Alfred Davidson arrived at Berakas Airport two days later. Lastly, he would be the high commissioner in Guyana from March 1975 to 1978.

== Death ==
Gautrey died on 7 February 2014.

== Honours ==
Peter Gauntrey was given the title of Yang Terutama (His Excellency) Dato Laila Utama by Sultan Hassanal Bolkiah. He would go on to earn the following awards;

=== National ===
- Order of St Michael and St George Companion (CMG; 1972)
- Order of the British Empire Member (CVO; 1961)

=== Foreign ===
- Brunei:
  - Family Order of Laila Utama (DK; 1972) – Dato Laila Utama

Diplomatic posts
Preceded by William Bates	British High Commissioner to Guyana; March 1975 – 1978	Succeeded by Philip Mallet
Preceded by Arthur Adair	British High Commissioner to Brunei; 12 January 1972 – 14 January 1975	Succeeded by James Davidson
Preceded by Office established	British High Commissioner to Swaziland; 2 September 1968 – January 1972	Succeeded by Eric Tocq
