= Pengiran Shariffuddin =

Bruneian historian (1936–2018)

Dato Paduka Pengiran Shariffuddin DPMB SMB PSB
- ڤڠيرن شريفالدين
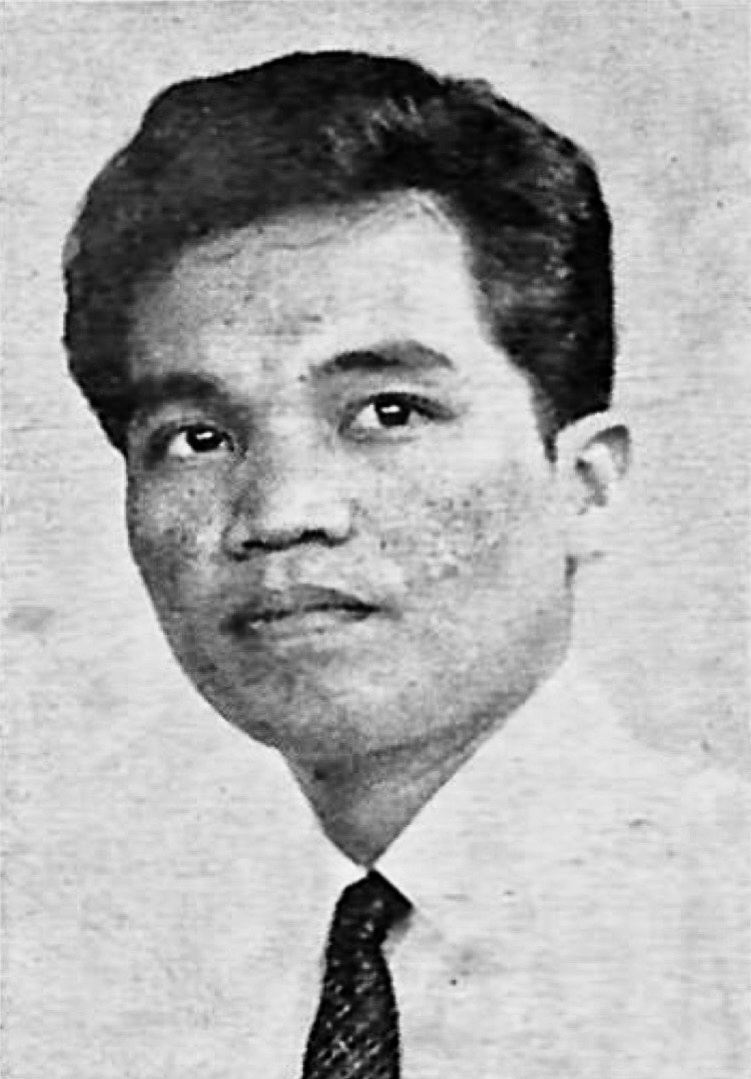
- Awangku Shariffuddin in c. 1960

1st Director of Brunei Museum
- In office 1 January 1974 – 31 December 1982
- Monarch: Hassanal Bolkiah
- Deputy: Lim Jock Seng
- Preceded by: Position established
- Succeeded by: Lim Jock Seng

Personal details
- Born: Awangku Shariffuddin bin Pengiran Metali; 19 October 1936 Tutong District, Brunei
- Died: 22 April 2018 (aged 81) Brunei
- Children: Pengiran Shazainah
- Relatives: Pengiran Muhammad Yusuf (uncle)
- Occupation: Historian; museum curator; monographer
- Awards: See here

Pengiran Shariffuddin bin Pengiran Metali (19 October 1936 – 22 April 2018), pen name P. M. Shariffuddin, was a historian and monographer from Brunei who previously served as the first director of the Brunei Museum from 1974 to 1982. Due to his understanding of the genealogical history of the Sultans of Brunei and profound comprehension of Brunei's sociocultural history, Pengiran Shariffuddin was a highly sought-after authority on Bruneian history and a valuable resource of information on the sultanate's early history.

== Early life and education ==
On 19 October 1936, Awangku Shariffuddin bin Pengiran Metali was born in Tutong District, which at the time was the third-largest district in Brunei but was still a remote region. He was brought up in pre-World War II Brunei and experienced a lot of hard yet fascinating realities. His early life was not nice because he came from a poor family and lived in a modest place. He once remembered that in order to get to the local school at Tutong, he had to walk a considerable distance through forests and under the intense tropical sun.

Nevertheless, Pengiran Shariffuddin have been inspired by his uncle Pengiran Muhammad Yusuf, who, like his nephew, was a distinguished official and life member of the Malaysian Branch of the Royal Asiatic Society (MBRAS) who eventually became Brunei's Menteri Besar. Through his example, he was early convinced that a solid education was essential to achieving greater things. In light of this, he applied to and was accepted into Brunei Town's Government English School, where he completed his secondary education from 1951 to 1957.

== Career ==
Following his secondary education, Pengiran Shariffuddin was dispatched by the government of Brunei in April 1957 to work as an apprentice at the Sarawak Museum in Kuching. Under the supervision of Tom Harrisson, who was leading the Niah Caves excavations, Pengiran Shariffuddin gained valuable knowledge about museum operations in Kuching, sparking his interest in Brunei's history and enhancing his research skills. This experience prepared him for his future role as the first director of Brunei Museum, after which he enrolled in the Museums Association of the United Kingdom's certificate program in public management and anthropology.

Pengiran Shariffuddin advanced to the position of assistant keeper in 1959, and was appointed museum officer in 1964. He has been a part of MBRAS since 1964. He was named a Vice President in 1972 and a Member of the Council in 1965. He were named acting curator on 1 May 1965, and on 1 March 1966, they were put on probation as a curator. He held the position of museum curator from 1 January 1968 to 31 December 1973; this position was subsequently renamed director museum. He then served as museum director from 1 January 1974 until 31 December 1982. He became a life member of MBRAS in 1982 after becoming a regular member in 1981.

Not only did Harrisson's guidance and exposure to archaeological work excite Pengiran Shariffuddin's interest in the then-largely uncharted historical territory of his own nation, Brunei, but Harrisson also improved his own historical research abilities. When Queen Elizabeth II visited Brunei in 1972, he was appointed as the inaugural director and curator of the country's oldest museum based on his expertise and training. He did, in fact, have a major role in the conception and building of the museum, which carried his signature.

Not long after leaving the civil service, Pengiran Shariffuddin became a well-liked local businessman with a wide range of ventures. His commercial ventures, which started in the 1980s, rapidly escalated subsequent to his retirement. He was in charge of several businesses under the PDS name, which he successfully created and expanded, which included PDS Abattoir, PDS Meat Industries, and the PDS International School. Pengiran Shariffuddin was a longtime member of MBRAS, but it wasn't until 1981 that he was granted a Life Membership. In that same year, his uncle Pengiran Yusuf, also received the same honour. As Vice-President, Pengiran Shariffuddin was regarded as an esteemed and knowledgeable individual who freely shared his opinions, particularly those pertaining to the overall betterment of MBRAS.

Early in 1981, Pengiran Shariffuddin forwarded a letter to MBRAS President Nik Ahmad Kamil inviting the council members to a meeting to be held in Brunei on behalf of the Bruneian government. The invitation was accepted, and on Wednesday, 27 May, eleven members of the council touched down in Bandar Seri Begawan via Royal Brunei Airlines. Pengiran Shariffuddin organised a special ceremony in the large Brunei Museum entrance hall, where retired Sultan Omar Ali Saifuddien III personally opened the council meeting in front of all the most important State officials and dignitaries, including Pehin Dato Isa, Pengiran Abdul Momin, and Pehin Dato Abdul Aziz.

As of 16 January 2018, Pengiran Shariffuddin was the Executive Chairman of Freme Travel Services.

== Death ==
At the age of 81, Pengiran Shariffuddin passed away quietly in Brunei on Sunday afternoon, 22 April 2018. He has a daughter, Pengiran Datin Paduka Shazainah, Deputy Permanent Secretary at the Ministry of Foreign Affairs and Trade, and a son, Pengiran Halaluddin, Chairman of GHK Motors.

== Monographs ==
Pengiran Shariffuddin's works and monographs include:

- Obituary: Tom Harrisson.
- Shariffuddin, P. M. (1969). Brunei Cannon. Vol. 1. Brunei Museum Journal.
- Shariffuddin, P. M. (1969). The Royal Wedding. Vol. 1. Brunei Museum Journal.
- Shariffuddin, P. M. (1969). The Kedayans. Vol. 1. Brunei Museum Journal.
- Lim, J. S.; Shariffuddin, P. M. Charcoal production in Brunei. Brunei Museum Journal.
- In Memoriam: Al-Marhum Sultan Sir Muda Omar' Ali Saifuddien Sa'adul Khairi Waddien'. Vol. 59. JMBRAS. 1986.
- Shariffuddin, P. M. (1970). Makan tahun : The Annual Feast of the Kadayan. Vol. 2. Brunei Museum Journal.
- Shariffuddin, P. M. (1970). Melanau Spirit Figures. Vol. 2. Brunei Museum Journal.
- Shariffuddin, P. M. (1970). Problems of getting materials for the Brunei Museum. Vol. 2. Brunei Museum Journal.
- Shariffuddin, P. M. (1970). Stone Age in Brunei. Vol. 2. Brunei Museum Journal.
- Shariffuddin, P. M.; Abdul Latif bin Haji Ibrahim (1974). The Genealogical Tablet (Batu Tarsilah) of the Sultans of Brunei. Vol. 3. Brunei Museum Journal.
- Shariffuddin, P. M.; Nicholl, Robert (1975). A Possible Example of Ancient Brunei Script. Vol. 3. Brunei Museum Journal.
- Shariffuddin, P. M. (1976). Museum Development in Brunei. Vol. 3. Brunei Museum Journal.
- Lim, J. S.; Shariffuddin, P. M. (1976). Brunei Brass: the Traditional Method. Vol. 3. Brunei Museum Journal.
- Shariffuddin, P. M.; Abdul Latif Haji Ibrahim (1977). The Royal Nobat of Brunei. Vol. 4. Brunei Museum Journal.
- Shariffuddin, P. M.; Omar, Matussin (1978). Distribution of Chinese and Siamese ceramics in Brunei. Vol. 4. Brunei Museum Journal.
- Ibrahim, Abdul Latif; Dato Shariffuddin, P. M. (1979). The Discovery of an Ancient Muslim Tombstone in Brunei. Vol. 4. Brunei Museum Journal.
- Shariffuddin, P. M. (1980). Undang-Undang dan Adat Istiadat Orang-Orang Belait Asli. Vol. 4. Brunei Museum Journal.

== Legacy ==
=== Recognition ===
In connection with the commemoration of International Museum Day, which Brunei hosted for the first time in May 2001. The Brunei National Archives Building's theater has been dubbed the "PM Shariffuddin Theater" in honour of him and his contributions to the Museums Department. In honour of him, the book Victor T. King; Stephen C. Druce (2021). Origins, History and Social Structure in Brunei Darussalam. London: Routledge.

=== Awards ===
Pengiran Shariffuddin has earned the following awards:

- Borneo Research Council Medal of Excellence (1996)
- Fellow of the Museum Association in London

=== Honours ===
Pengiran Shariffuddin has earned the following honours:

- Order of Seri Paduka Mahkota Brunei Second Class (DPMB) – Dato Paduka
- Order of Seri Paduka Mahkota Brunei Third Class (SMB)
- Order of Setia Negara Brunei Fourth Class (PSB)

Cultural offices
Preceded by Position established	1st Director of Brunei Museum; 1 January 1974 – 31 December 1982	Succeeded by Lim Jock Seng
