= Governor Watson =

Governor Watson may refer to:

- Arthur Christopher Watson (1927–2001), Governor of the Turks and Caicos Islands from 1975 to 1978 and Governor of Montserrat from 1985 to 1987
- Charles Watson (Royal Navy officer) (1714–1757), Colonial Governor of Newfoundland in 1748
- William T. Watson (1849–1917), 49th Governor of Delaware
