= Norman Saunders =

Norman Saunders may refer to:

- Norman Saunders (artist)
- Norman Saunders (politician)
