= Matussin Omar =

Bruneian historian and writer (born 1948)

Dato Paduka Matussin Omar DPMB SMB SNB PJK PKL
- ماتوسسين عمر

3rd Director of Brunei Museum
- In office 1987–1995
- Monarch: Hassanal Bolkiah
- Deputy: Lim Jock Seng
- Preceded by: Matassim Jibah
- Succeeded by: Lim Jock Seng

Personal details
- Born: 16 November 1948 (age 77) Kampong Sumbiling Lama, Brunei Town, Brunei
- Education: Sultan Omar Ali Saifuddien College
- Alma mater: University of Malaya (BSc); Australian National University
- Occupation: Historian; museum curator; teacher; civil servant; writer
- Awards: Mastera Literary Award

Matussin bin Omar (born 16 November 1948), pen name D. P. Matussin, is a historian, civil servant and writer from Brunei who previously served as the third director of the Brunei Museum from 1987 to 1995. He started writing poetry, short tales, essays, and song lyrics in 1962. Since then, he has established himself as a well-known scholar of Bruneian literature and culture.

== Early life and education ==
Matussin bin Omar was born in Kampong Sumbiling Lama on 16 November 1948. Early education was obtained at Sultan Omar Ali Saifuddien College (SOASC) from 1959 to 1968 and Sultan Muhammad Jamalul Alam Malay School from 1955 to 1958. He continued his education at the University of Malaya in Kuala Lumpur from 1969 to 1973, earning a Bachelor of Science (BSc) degree in Sociology and Anthropology. In 1976, the government of Brunei sent him to the Australian National University in Canberra as part of the In-Service Training Scheme, where he earned a Master's degree in Prehistory in 1979.

== Career ==
Matussin began employment in SOASC as a teacher. He transferred to the Department of Museums at the end of 1973 and took a job there as an Archaeological Officer. He was named Curator of Archaeology in 1977. He served as the Department of Museums' Deputy Director from 1 January 1983 until 1987. In 1987, he was named Director of Brunei Museum, a role he maintained until 1995.

Matussin was hired on 4 December 1995, by the Ministry of Youth, Culture and Sports (MCYS) as a Special Duties Officer. He was selected as the Chef De Mission for the Brunei delegation in the 1997 SEA Games, which were held in Jakarta, Indonesia. Additionally, he served as the MCYS' Permanent Secretary. In addition to his writing career, he has been penning song lyrics for events such as Family Day and International Museum Day, when Brunei celebrated at the Brunei Museum.

== Monographs ==
Matussin's works and monographs include:

- Batu nisan Aceh di Brunei (in Malay).
- Penggalian bahan-bahan purbakala (in Malay).
- Islam di Brunei dari perspektif aksiologi (in Malay).
- Meriam Sepanyol di Kampong Ayer (in Malay). 1981.
- Peniup umpong dengan Puteri Gunong Maulu (in Malay).
- Mengakas Yang Terpendam: Pengenalan Umum Tentang Arkeologi (in Malay).
- Haji Matussin bin Omar. Pengaruh Islam ke atas Peralatan Budaya Orang-Orang Melayu Brunei (in Malay).
- Matussin bin Omar; Sha'ari bin Ahmad. Tembok batu abad ke-15/16 Masehi di Kota Batu: laporan ringkas (in Malay).
- Shariffuddin, P. M.; Matussin bin Omar (1970). Stone Age in Brunei. Vol. 2. Brunei Museum Journal.
- Matussin bin Omar (1975). A preliminary account of surface finds from Tanjung Batu Beach, Muara. Vol. 3. Brunei Museum Journal.
- Matussin bin Omar (1978). Archaeological excavations in protohistoric Brunei. Canberra: Australian National University.
- Shariffuddin, P. M.; Omar, Matussin (1978). Distribution of Chinese and Siamese ceramics in Brunei. Vol. 4. Brunei Museum Journal.
- Matussin bin Omar (1978). Radio Carbon Dates for Kupang and Sungai Lumut, Brunei. Vol. 4. Brunei Museum Journal.
- Bellwood, Peter; Omar, M. (1980). Trade patterns & political developments in Brunei & adjacent areas, A.D. 700-1500. Vol. 4. Brunei Museum Journal.
- Matussin bin Omar (1994). Archaeology and the reconstruction of Brunei's Early History. Vol. 9. Brunei Museum Journal.

== Awards and honours ==
=== Awards ===
Matussin was awarded the 2012 Mastera Literary Award for his work, Omar, Matussin bin (2009). Biarkan kami bernafas (in Malay). Dewan Bahasa dan Pustaka Brunei, Kementerian Kebudayaan, Belia dan Sukan. ISBN 978-99917-0-665-8.

=== Honours ===
Matussin has earned the following honours:

- Order of Seri Paduka Mahkota Brunei Second Class (DPMB; 15 July 1994) – Dato Paduka
- Order of Seri Paduka Mahkota Brunei Third Class (SMB; 1986)
- Order of Setia Negara Brunei Third Class (SNB; 15 July 1991)
- Meritorious Service Medal (PJK; 1999)
- Long Service Medal (PKL; 1996)
- Sultan of Brunei Silver Jubilee Medal (1993)

Cultural offices
Preceded by Lim Jock Seng	3rd Director of Brunei Museum; 1987–1995	Succeeded by Matassim Jibah
