= Governor Davidson =

Governor Davidson may refer to:

- James Alfred Davidson (1921–2004), Governor of the British Virgin Islands from 1978 to 1982
- James O. Davidson (1854–1922), Governor of Wisconsin from 1906 to 1911
- Walter Edward Davidson (1859–1923), Governor of the Seychelles from 1904 to 1912, Governor of Newfoundland from 1913 to 1917, and Governor of New South Wales from 1918 to 1923
