= SOASC =

SOASC may refer to:

- Stone Oakvalley's Authentic SID Collection
- Sultan Omar Ali Saifuddien College, a secondary school in Brunei
