= Lim Jock Seng =

Bruneian politician

Yang Dimuliakan Pehin Orang Kaya Pekerma Dewa Dato Seri Setia Lim Jock Seng PSNB SPMB PJK PKL PSM
- 林玉成
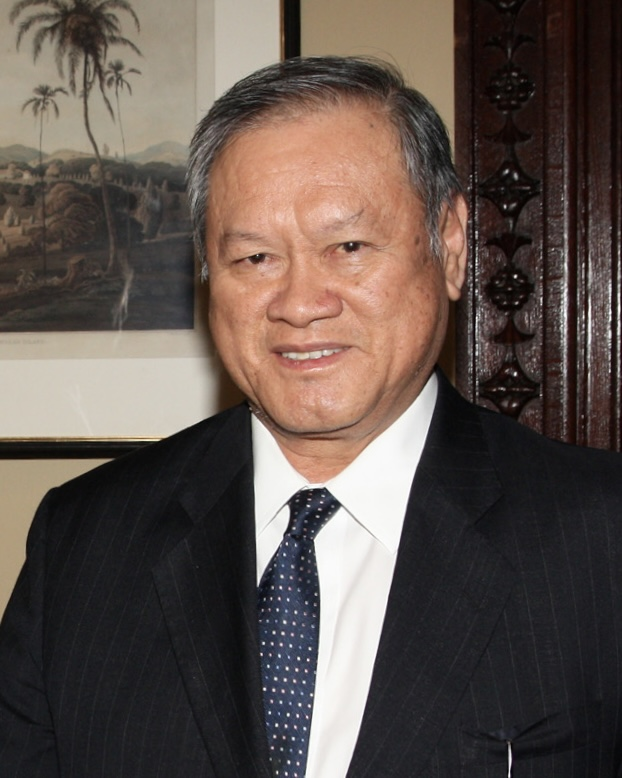
- Minister Lim in 2013

1st Minister of Foreign Affairs and Trade II
- In office 24 May 2005 – 29 January 2018
- Monarch: Hassanal Bolkiah
- Deputy: Erywan Yusof
- Preceded by: Office established
- Succeeded by: Erywan Yusof

Minister at the Prime Minister's Office
- In office 22 October 2015 – 29 January 2018 Serving with Abdul Rahman Ibrahim
- Deputy: Hamdan Abu Bakar; Roselan Daud
- Succeeded by: Isa Ibrahim; Amin Liew Abdullah; Abdul Mokti Daud
Other positions
Member of the Legislative Council
In office 25 September 2004 – 29 January 2018
Chairman of Royal Brunei Airlines
In office 2008–2010
Preceded by	Abu Bakar Ismail
Succeeded by	Bahrin Abdullah
2nd Director of Brunei Museum
In office 1 January 1983 – 5 August 1983
Deputy	Matussin Omar
Preceded by	Pengiran Shariffuddin
Succeeded by	Matussin Omar

Personal details
- Born: Lim Jock Seng; 22 January 1944 (age 82) Muara, Brunei-Muara, Brunei
- Spouse: Tan Bee Yong
- Relations: Lim Jock Hoi (brother)
- Education: Swansea University (BSc); London School of Economics (MPhil)
- Occupation: Anthropologist; politician; diplomat; civil servant

Chinese name
- Simplified Chinese: 林玉成
- Traditional Chinese: 林玉成
Transcriptions
Standard Mandarin
- Hanyu Pinyin: Lín Yùchéng
Southern Min
- Hokkien POJ: Lîm Gio̍k-sêng

Lim Jock Seng (Chinese: 林玉成; pinyin: Lín Yùchéng; Pe̍h-ōe-jī: Lîm Gio̍k-sêng; born 22 January 1944) is a Bruneian aristocrat, anthropologist, politician and diplomat who served as first Minister of Foreign Affairs & Trade II. Additionally, he was a member of the Privy Council in 2003, and Legislative Council of Brunei in 2004. Other than holding government offices, he was also the chairman of Brunei Shell Petroleum (BSP) and Royal Brunei Airlines (RBA) from 2008 to 2010.

== Early life and education ==
Lim Jock Seng was born in Muara town on 22 January 1944. He obtained his early education at the Sultan Omar Ali Saifuddien College, and graduated with a Bachelor of Science (BSc) with honours in economics from Swansea University, Wales in 1969, and received a Master of Philosophy (Mphil) in social anthropology from the London School of Economics in 1981.

== Museum career ==
Lim joined the civil service on 23 July 1969, starting his career as a curator in the Museums Department. He worked at the Department of Ethnography, British Museum from 1972 to 1973, in addition to being an Assistant Curator for the Museums Department from 1969 to 1973. He became the Deputy Director at the Museums Department from 1974 to 31 December 1982, promoted to Director at the Museums Department from 1 January 1983 to 5 August 1983.

Lim has published several works which included:

- Lim, J. S. (1977). A Postal History of Brunei 1906–1937. Brunei Museum Journal.
- A Short Account of Sago Production in Kuala Balai–Belait. Brunei Museum Journal. 1974.
- Lim, J. S.; Shariffuddin, P. M. (1976). Brunei Brass : the Traditional Method. Vol. 3. Brunei Museum Journal.
- Lim, J. S.; Shariffuddin, P. M. Charcoal production in Brunei. Brunei Museum Journal.
- Lim, J. S. Fishing crafts. Brunei Museum Journal.
- The Chinese middlemen in a malay fishing town.
- Lim, Jock Seng (1986). The Inter-relationship of Technology, Economy, and Social Organisation in a Fishing Village in Brunei. Brunei Museum Journal.

== Political career ==
Lim entered the Diplomatic Service Department in 1982, and joined the Ministry of Foreign Affairs (MFA). He first held roles such as Director-General of ASEAN–Brunei Darussalam in August 1983. In February 1986, he was then named High Commissioner of Brunei Darussalam to New Zealand. He started working for the MFA in May 1986 as the Director of Politics and was later elevated to the position of Permanent Secretary.

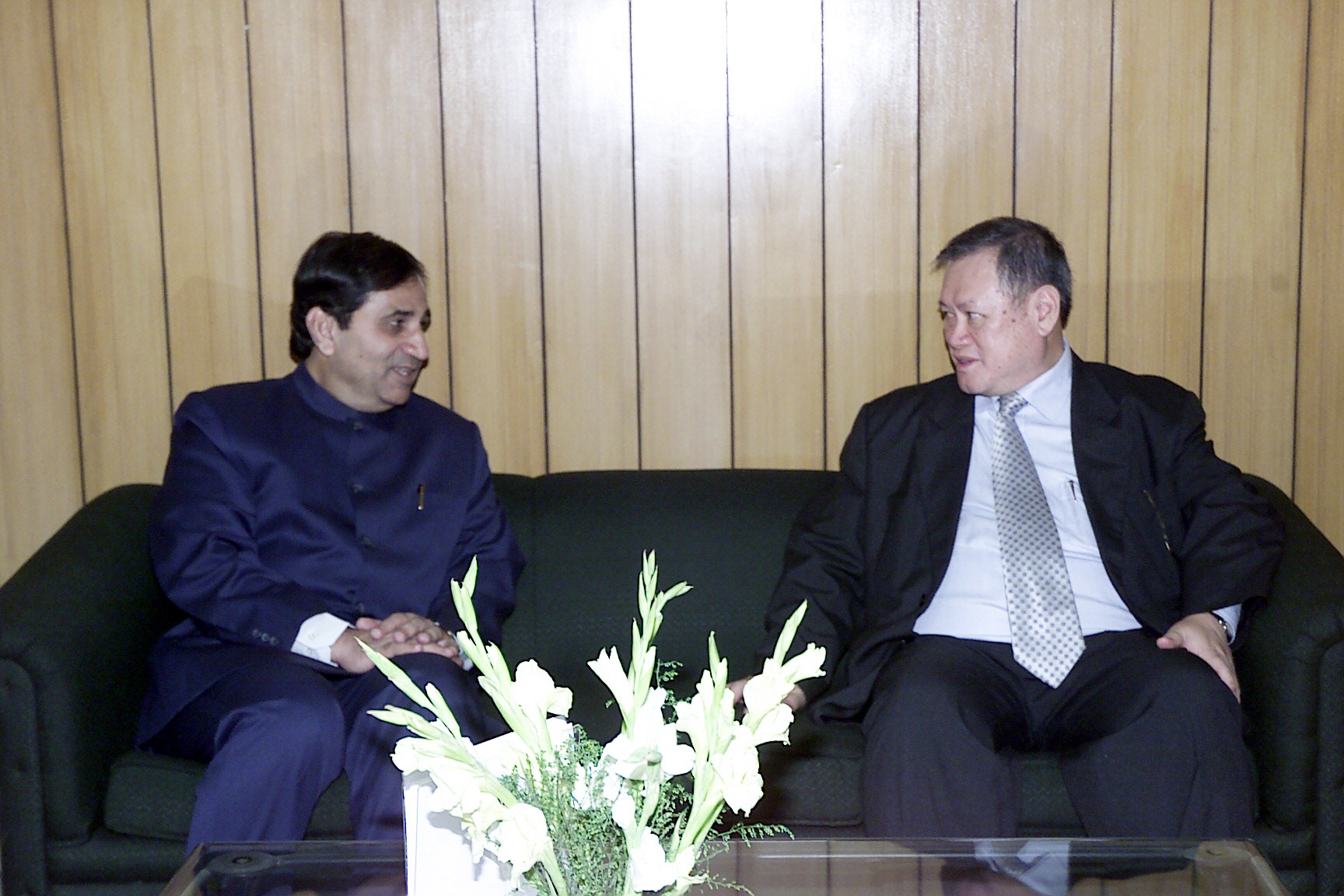
Shakeel Ahmad and Pehin Lim in New Delhi, 2006

In October 1986, Lim was named Permanent Secretary of the Ministry of Foreign Affairs. From 2001 until 2003, he was international chair on the Pacific Economic Cooperation Council and a member of the ASEAN Eminent Persons Group. Sultan Hassanal Bolkiah named him in 2003 to the Privy Council and in 2004 to the Legislative Council as an official member. In the 2005 Bruneian cabinet reshuffle on 24 May, Lim was named Second Minister of Foreign Affairs.

On 1 May 2010, the Western Washington University Department of Anthropology hosted a group from Brunei. Pehin Lim and Yusoff Abdul Hamid traveled with the intention of seeing Linda Kimball. Kimball was a renowned expert on the language and customs of the Bruneian Malay people. On the final day of the APEC Ministerial Meeting in Yokohama, Japan, 10–11 November 2010, Peter Van Loan talks with Pehin Lim.

Pehin Lim emphasised the significance of bilateral and international free trade agreements for Brunei at the Legislative Council meeting on 7 March 2011. He stressed that these accords help consumers, expand the nation's market reach, boost the competitiveness of domestic goods, and draw in foreign capital. Because to Brunei's participation in various accords, such as those with the TPP, Japan, ASEAN, and other nations, commerce has been facilitated, export competitiveness has grown, and economic diversification has been encouraged.

Following the 2015 Bruneian cabinet reshuffle on 22 October, Lim was appointed as minister at the Prime Minister's Office, while co-currently minister of foreign affairs and trade II.

In January 2016, Lim met with Japanese Foreign Minister Fumio Kishida. At that time, Lim's official role was "Minister at Prime Minister's Office and Second Minister of Foreign Affairs and Trade of Brunei Darussalam."

At the signing ceremony held on 5 August 2017, at the Philippine International Convention Center (PICC), Pasay City, Lim signed the updated Memorandum of Understanding (MoU) between the governments of the ASEAN member states and the government of China on establishing the ASEAN-China Center. On 22 September, Pehin Lim speaks during the general discussion of the 72nd session of the United Nations General Assembly. He later traveled to Thailand on 25 October, in order to be present for the royal cremation of King Bhumibol Adulyadej. His mnisterial career came to an end following a cabinet reshuffle on 30 January 2018.

== Personal life ==
Lim is married to Datin Tan Bee Yong.

== Awards and honours ==
Lim was bestowed the Manteri title of Yang Dimuliakan Pehin Orang Kaya Pekerma Dewa in May 1996, in recognition of his contributions, together with other commendable honours. Throughout his career, he has earned the following honours and fellowships:

=== Fellowships ===
- Associate of the Museums Association (AMA; 1975)
- Fellow of the Museums Association (FMA; 1982)
- Fellowship of the Royal Anthropological Institute (FRAI)

=== Honours ===
National

- Order of Setia Negara Brunei First Class (PSNB; 15 July 2006) – Dato Seri Setia
- Order of Seri Paduka Mahkota Brunei First Class (SPMB) – Dato Seri Paduka
- Order of Seri Paduka Mahkota Brunei Second Class (DPMB)
- Order of Seri Paduka Mahkota Brunei Third Class (SMB)
- Sultan Hassanal Bolkiah Medal First Class (PHBS; 15 July 2010)
- Meritorious Service Medal (PJK)
- Long Service Medal (PKL)

Foreign

- Japan:
  - Order of the Rising Sun Second Class (3 November 2013)
- Malaysia:
  - Honorary Commander of the Order of Loyalty to the Crown of Malaysia (PSM; 2015)
  - Knight Commander of the Most Exalted Order of the Star of Sarawak (PNBS; 2014) – Dato Sri
- Thailand:
  - Knight Grand Cross of the Order of the White Elephant (PCh (KCE); August 2002)
- United Kingdom:
  - Honorary Fellow, Doctorate and degree from the Swansea University (1991)

== See also ==
- List of current foreign ministers
- List of foreign ministers in 2017
- Cabinet of Brunei
- Ethnic Chinese in Brunei

Political offices
Preceded by Office established	Minister of Foreign Affairs II; 24 May 2005 – 29 January 2018	Succeeded by Erywan Yusof
Business positions
Preceded by Abu Bakar Ismail	Chairman of Royal Brunei Airlines; 2008–2010	Succeeded by Bahrin Abdullah
Cultural offices
Preceded by Pengiran Shariffuddin	2nd Director of Brunei Museum; 1 January 1983 – 5 August 1983	Succeeded by Matussin Omar
