= James Alfred Davidson =

British politician and diplomat (1922–2004)

Commander James Alfred Davidson OBE
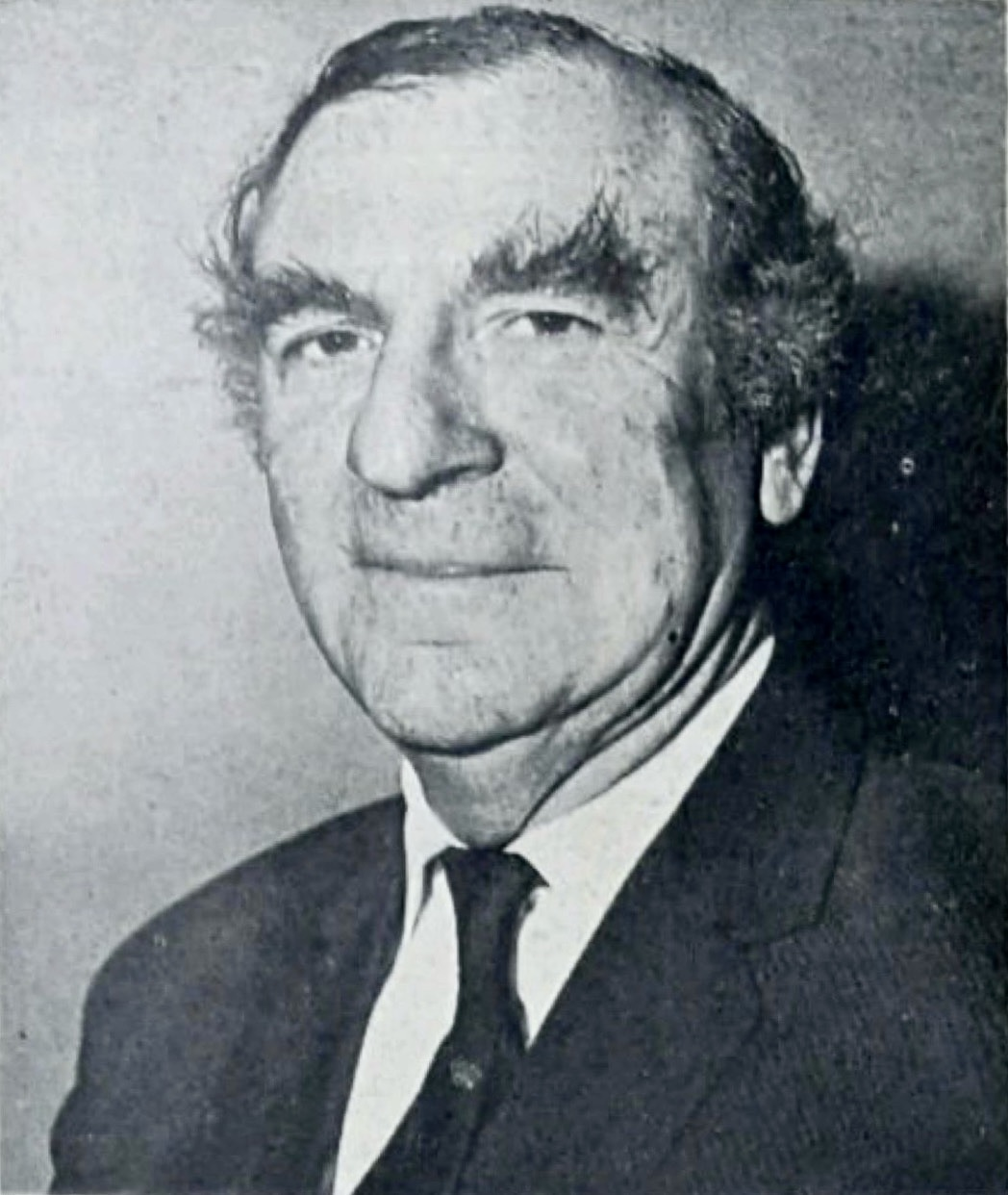
- Davidson in 1975

3rd Governor of the British Virgin Islands
- In office 5 November 1978 – 7 November 1981
- Monarch: Elizabeth II
- Preceded by: Walter Wallace
- Succeeded by: David Barwick

7th British High Commissioner to Brunei
- In office January 1975 – 1978
- Preceded by: Peter Gautrey
- Succeeded by: Arthur Watson

Personal details
- Born: 22 March 1922 Portsmouth, England
- Died: 8 May 2004 (aged 82) United Kingdom
- Spouse: Daphne Merritt (m. 1955)
- Children: 2 daughters and 2 stepsons
- Occupation: Military officer and diplomat

Military service
- Allegiance: United Kingdom
- Branch/service: Royal Navy
- Years of service: 1939–1961
- Rank: Commander
- Unit: HMS Hawkins (D86); HMS Inconstant (H49); HMS Calder (K349); HMS Rocket (H92); HMS Childers (R91)
- Battles/wars: World War II

Commander James Alfred Davidson (22 March 1922 – 8 May 2004) was a British naval commander and diplomat. After serving during the Second World War, he joined the Commonwealth Relations Office where he held several posts in Cambodia, Brunei, Bangladesh and the British Virgin Islands. He was an honorary member of the Royal Numismatic Society.

== Early life ==
James Alfred Davidson was born in Portsmouth, England on 22 March 1922, and was educated at Portsmouth Grammar School and Christ's Hospital, then at the Royal Naval College, Dartmouth. His first posting, as a midshipman, was to HMS Hawkins (D86), but in 1942 he was transferred to the destroyer HMS Inconstant (H49). In 1943 he was appointed first lieutenant of the frigate HMS Calder (K349). A year later, in February 1944, at the age of just 21, Davidson took temporary command of the ship. Davidson joined HMS Rocket (H92) a few months later, an Eastern Fleet destroyer which took part in the Battle of Penang. He trained to be a pilot and later served as executive officer and first lieutenant on HMS Childers (R91).

== Diplomatic career ==
In 1951 he was posted as naval liaison officer to the Chinese Nationalist Government. He married his wife Daphne Merritt in 1955. He joined the Commonwealth Relations Office (CRO) in 1960. His first assignment was as first secretary in the newly independent Trinidad. In 1969, he was posted to Phnom Penh, Cambodia, where he witnessed the overthrow of Prince Sihanouk. He continued to serve until the Khmer Rouge fully took over the country.

Davidson wrote a book on the region in 1979: Indo-China: Signposts in the Storm. He was appointed OBE in 1971. After the India-Pakistan war, he became deputy high commissioner in East Pakistan, which was soon to become Bangladesh. In this position, Davidson took part in negotiations on Indira Gandhi's visit to Bangladesh in March 1972. His next two appointments were to Brunei as High Commissioner and as Governor of the British Virgin Islands.

Davidson participated in discussions for a new Brunei-UK Treaty, which was eventually signed on 7 January 1979, after he had departed Bandar Seri Begawan. He also wrote on the sultanate in pieces such as "Postal Services in Brunei's Water Town" (Brunei Museum Journal 1976) and "Brunei Coinage" (BMJ 1977).

== Later life ==
Davidson retired from the Diplomatic Service in 1981. He continued to take up several other positions including as a visiting fellow at the London School of Economics he decided to do a pupillage at the Admiralty Bar. He was a member of the inquiry into the sinking of the MS European Gateway. He worked as a Visiting Fellow at the London School of Economics' Centre for International Studies (1982-1984) and as Chairman of the Pensions Appeals Tribunals (1984-1995). He died on 8 May 2004, at the age of 82. His widow (Daphne), four children (Duncan, Gavin, Caroline, and Emma), and a slew of grandkids survive him.

== Bibliography ==
- Davidson, James (1979). Indo-China, Signposts in the Storm. University of Michigan: Longman. ISBN 9780582726031.

== Honours ==
James Davidson was given the honorary title of Yang Terutama (His Excellency) by the Government of Brunei. He has also earned the following honours;

- Order of the British Empire Officer (OBE)

Diplomatic posts
Preceded by Walter Wallace	Governor of the British Virgin Islands; 5 November 1978 – 7 November 1981	Succeeded by David Barwick
Preceded by Peter Gautrey	British High Commissioner to Brunei; January 1975 – 1978	Succeeded by Arthur Watson
