= Brunei Museum =

National museum of Brunei

- Muzium Brunei
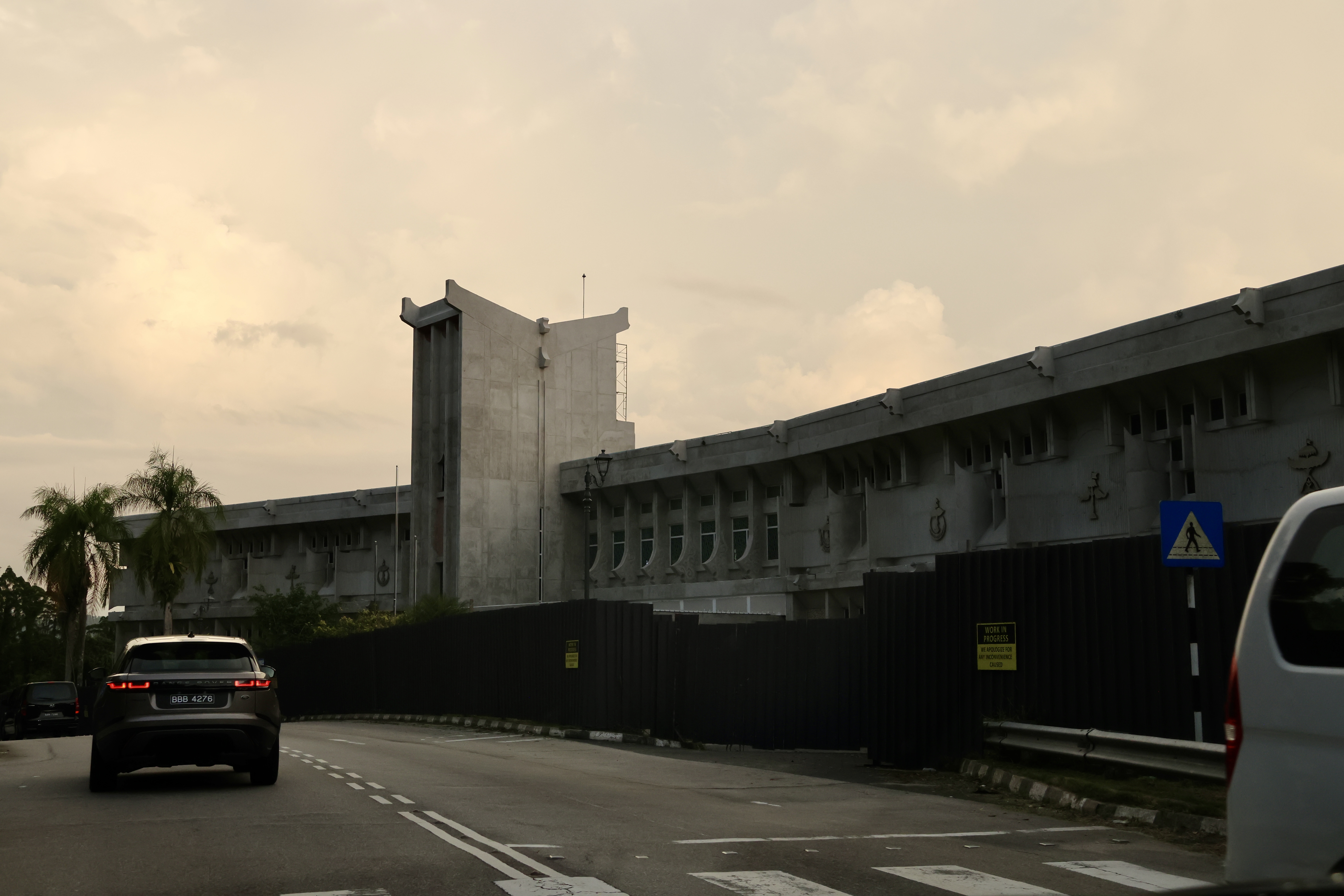
- The museum in 2023
- Established: 1965
- Location: Simpang 482, Kota Batu, Bandar Seri Begawan, Brunei
- Coordinates: 4°53′06.9″N 114°58′07.6″E
- Type: National museum
- Collections: Historical, cultural, and natural heritage artefacts
- Owner: Government of Brunei
- Nearest parking: On site (no charge)
- Website: www.museums.gov.bn

Brunei Museum (Malay: Muzium Brunei, Jawi: موزيوم بروني), the country's largest and most significant national museum, is located in Kota Batu, Bandar Seri Begawan. This national museum houses a collection spanning Islamic art, Southeast Asian history from the 16th century, and extensive displays in archaeology and ethnography. Although the museum closed in 2014 for major repairs and upgrades, its much-anticipated reopening, initially set for 2020, has been delayed and remains closed as of 2025.

== Location ==
The Brunei Museum is located in Kota Batu, approximately 4.5 kilometers (3 miles) from the capital's city centre, along Jalan Kota Batu. It is part of a museum complex that includes the Kota Batu Archaeological Park, Malay Technology Museum and the Brunei Darussalam Maritime Museum. This complex is situated on the scenic delta and slopes of the Brunei River, near historically significant sites such as the tombs of Sultan Sharif Ali and Sultan Bolkiah.

== History ==
Founded in 1965 in the Civic Centre in Brunei Town (present day Bandar Seri Begawan) and relocated to Kota Batu in 1970, the Brunei Museum has been an integral part of Brunei's scholarship and research, particularly before Universiti Brunei Darussalam was founded. The construction of the new building began in 1968 and was completed in 1970 at a cost of M$4.39 million at that time. It was inaugurated on 29 February 1972 by Queen Elizabeth II. In 1969, it established the Brunei Museum Journal, a significant periodical in Bruneian studies that was published consistently until 1997 and resurrected in 2008.

Closed since 28 January 2014, the Brunei Museum is now undergoing major renovations to fix structural concerns brought on by termites, soil erosion, electrical malfunctions, and air conditioning issues. Despite the building's age, the Ministry of Culture, Youth and Sports has no plans to replace it because of its heritage importance. Some exhibits have been moved to other locations during the shutdown, including as the Belait District Museum, Tasek Merimbun Heritage Park, Brunei Darussalam Maritime Museum, and the Malay Technology Museum. The closure has also been intended to make way for upgrade, which includes redesigning the interior and exhibits, incorporating more interactivity and modern technology, and creating a new open-concept gallery.

== Directors ==
- 1974–1982: Pengiran Shariffuddin
- 1983–1983: Lim Jock Seng
- 1987–1995: Matussin Omar
- 2001–2006: Matassim bin Haji Jibah
- 2006-2012: Bantong Antaran
- 2015-2016: Pengiran Dr Karim Pg Hj Osman

== Design and features ==
The Brunei Museum building features traditional Malay motifs, inspired by the tomb of Sultan Bolkiah, a 15th century ruler of the Bruneian Empire. The museum itself spans three floors, with 3939,000 square feet (3,600 m^{2}) dedicated to exhibitions, 9,000 square feet for research and administrative offices, and 5,000 square feet for storage. Situated on a site covering 48 hectares (120 acres), the museum's grounds also include a surrounding park.

== Exhibits ==
The Brunei Museum holds a vast and diverse collection encompassing ethnography, archaeology, prehistory, and modern history. Among its material culture collections are silverware, brassware, wood sculptures, textiles, and traditional artifacts accumulated over six decades. The museum also showcases notable displays on natural history and the development of Brunei’s petroleum industry, highlighting the nation's industrial progress and cultural heritage.

The museum features various galleries, including an Islamic art gallery, a natural history gallery, and a space for temporary exhibitions. Its History Gallery presents displays on Southeast Asia’s historical ties to Brunei, from the 16th century Spanish and Portuguese Empires through to more recent eras. This gallery also explores traditional lifestyles of the country’s communities and its rich natural flora and fauna. Artefacts include 9th and 10th-century pottery from Iran and Central Asia, glasswork from Egypt and the Levant, a miniature Quran manuscript, woven textiles, gold ornaments, ceremonial cannons, and sultanate weaponry.

Much of the museum's collection is drawn from the personal collections of the Sultan of Brunei, including silver and gold coins from across the Islamic world. A unique exhibit titled The Spirit of Budo: The History of Japan's Martial Artsdisplays replicas of armor and weapons from 8th to 14th century Japan. A showcase on Brunei's oil industry, created by Brunei Shell Petroleum, traces the nation's discovery of oil and its profound economic impact. Larger exhibits are displayed in rooms at the rear of the building, while administrative and technical sections are housed in the basement.

== See also ==
- List of museums in Brunei
