= Emmanuel Misick =

Turks and Caicos Islands politician

Emmanuel Misick is a politician from the Turks and Caicos Islands. He served on a four-member interim Advisory Council from July 1986 to 3 March 1988 after the then-Chief Minister, Norman Saunders, and a member of his cabinet were forced to resign and ministerial government in the territory was suspended. He was a member of the National Democratic Alliance.

Ministerial government resumed after elections were held in early 1988.
