= Nathaniel Francis (Turks and Caicos Islander politician) =

4th Chief Minister of the Turks and Caicos Islands
- In office 28 March 1985 – 25 July 1986
- Monarch: Elizabeth II
- Governor: Christopher J. Turner
- Preceded by: Norman Saunders
- Succeeded by: Oswald Skippings

Personal details
- Born: Nathaniel Joseph Selver Francis; 6 May 1912 Grand Turk Island, Turks and Caicos Islands
- Died: 2 November 2004 (aged 92)
- Party: Progressive National Party

Nathaniel Joseph Selver Francis (6 May 1912 – 2 November 2004) was a Turks and Caicos Islander politician who served as the 4th Chief Minister of the Turks and Caicos Islands from 28 March 1985 until 25 July 1986, when he was forced to resign after charges of corruption and patronage were leveled against him.

Prior to becoming Chief Minister, Francis was deputy minister of public works.

Francis died in 2004 and the new Parliament Buildings of the Turks and Caicos was renamed NJS Francis Building in 2005.

Political offices
Preceded by Norman Saunders	Chief Minister of the Turks and Caicos Islands; 1985–1986	Vacant Office suspended Title next held by Oswald Skippings
