= List of high commissioners of the United Kingdom to Guyana =

The high commissioner of the United Kingdom to Guyana is the United Kingdom's foremost diplomatic representative in the Republic of Guyana.

The UK's high commissioner to Guyana has also been non-resident British ambassador to Suriname since that country gained its independence on 25 November 1975.

== List of heads of mission ==
=== High commissioners to Guyana ===
- 1966–1967: Timothy Crosthwait
- 1967–1970: Kenneth Ritchie
- 1970–1975: William Bates
- 1975–1978: Peter Gautrey
- 1978–1982: Philip Mallet
- 1982–1985: William Slatcher
- 1985–1987: John Dudley Massingham
- 1987–1990: David Small
- 1990–1993: Douglas Gordon
- 1993–1998: David Johnson
- 1998: Ian Whitehead
- 1998–2002: Edward Glover
- 2002–2006: Stephen Hiscock
- 2006–2010: Fraser Wheeler
- 2011–2015: Andrew Ayre
- 2015–2021: Greg Quinn
- 2021-2026: Jane Miller
- 2026–present: Joseph Fisher

== See also ==
- List of high commissioners of Guyana to the United Kingdom
