= Jane Miller (diplomat) =

British diplomat

Her Excellency Jane Miller OBE
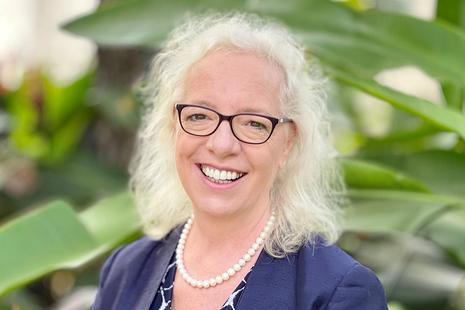

High Commissioner of the United Kingdom to Guyana
- In office 20 July 2021 – 1 April 2026
- Monarchs: Elizabeth II; Charles III
- Prime Minister: Boris Johnson; Liz Truss; Rishi Sunak; Keir Starmer
- Preceded by: Greg Quinn
- Succeeded by: Joseph Fisher MBE

Personal details
- Born: 1965 or 1966 (age 59–60)
- Spouse: Rob Miller
- Children: 1

Jane Caroline Miller OBE is a British diplomat who was mostly recently High Commissioner of the United Kingdom to Guyana from 2021 until 2026. She was the first female to be appointed to the post. She also serves as Ambassador of the United Kingdom to CARICOM and non-resident Ambassador to the Republic of Suriname.

== Early career ==
Miller started her career as a dietitian before joining Voluntary Services Overseas and then the Overseas Development Administration. She then worked for the World Bank before joining the Department for International Development in 2005, where she operated in Africa, in particular Tanzania.

Miller received the Order of the British Empire in the 2015 New Year Honours for services to Development in Africa, particularly towards ending Female Genital Mutilation.

== High Commissioner ==
Miller was appointed as High Commissioner of the United Kingdom to Guyana and Non-Resident Ambassador to the Republic of Suriname on 11 June 2021, succeeding Greg Quinn. She was accredited on 20 July 2021.

On 18 October 2022, Miller announced visa-free access for Guyanese passport holders to enter the United Kingdom from 9 November.

Miller was directly criticised by the Guyanese opposition parties A Partnership for National Unity and Alliance for Change in November 2022 for her claims that the current voter list (as used in the 2020 Guyanese general election) is acceptable for use with existing safeguarding mechanisms. Leader of the opposition Aubrey Norton claimed that she made "ill-informed comments" and that "the present voters list is bloated", before stating that Miller "must not be allowed to go against the wishes of the Guyanese people".

== Personal life ==
Miller is married to Dr. Rob Miller. They have one daughter. Miller's eldest daughter, Zoe, died in 2012 at the age of 13 in a railway accident on the West Coast Mainline near Berkhamsted. Their other daughter is named Sam.
