= Missick =

Missick is a surname. Notable people with the surname include:

- Akierra Missick (born 1983), Turks and Caicos Islands lawyer and politician
- Dorian Missick (born 1976), American actor
- Rosita Beatrice Missick-Butterfield (1936–2015), Turks and Caicos Islands politician
- Simone Missick (born 1982), American film and television actress

== See also ==
- Misick
