= List of high commissioners of the United Kingdom to Eswatini =

The high commissioner of the United Kingdom to Eswatini is the United Kingdom's foremost diplomatic representative in the Kingdom of Eswatini (a.k.a. Swaziland), and head of the UK's diplomatic mission in Mbabane.

As fellow members of the Commonwealth of Nations, the United Kingdom and Mbabane conduct their diplomatic relations at governmental level, rather than between heads of state. Therefore, the countries exchange high commissioners, rather than ambassadors.

Until 2019, the UK had been represented in Eswatini in a non-resident fashion by its high commissioner to South Africa, but in 2018, it was announced that the UK would return to having a resident high commissioner.

== Non-resident high commissioners to Eswatini ==
as high commissioners to South Africa

- 2013–2017: Dame Judith Macgregor
- 2017–2019: Nigel Casey

== High commissioners to Eswatini ==
- 2019–2020: John Lindfield MBE
- 2020–2024: Simon Boyden
- From August 2024: Colin Wells
