= Sultan Omar Ali Saifuddien College =

Public college in Bandar Seri Begawan, Brunei

Sultan Omar 'Ali Saifuddien College
- Maktab Sultan Omar 'Ali Saifuddien

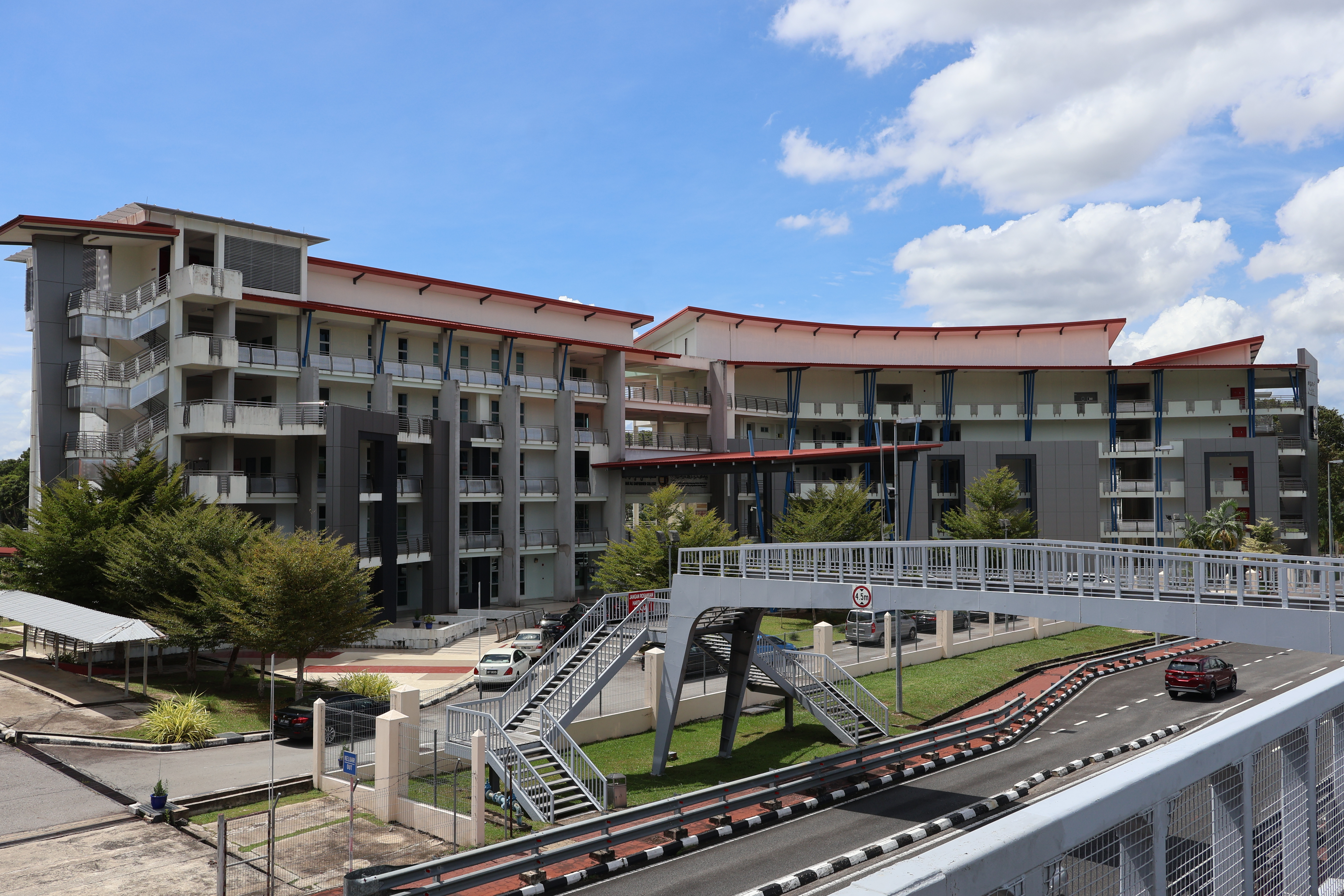
- SOASC New Building in 2024

Location
- Jalan Sekolah; Bandar Seri Begawan, BS8411; Brunei
- Coordinates: 4°53′58.4″N 114°56′17.4″E

Information
- Former name: Brunei Town Government English School (1951–1955)
- School type: Government
- Motto: Ilmu Adalah Kuasa (Knowledge Is Power)
- Established: 15 October 1951; 74 years ago
- School district: Cluster 2
- Authority: Ministry of Education
- Principal: Mohammed Santra Bolhasan
- Grades: Years 7–11
- Gender: Boys
- Slogan: The Premier College For Future Leaders
- Yearbook: Seri Berunai
- Affiliation: CIE
- Website: Official Instagram

The Sultan Omar 'Ali Saifuddien College (SOASC), natively known as Maktab Sultan Omar 'Ali Saifuddien (MSOAS), is a government boys' secondary school in Bandar Seri Begawan, the capital of Brunei. It is the first English secondary school in the country. The school is also one of only three boys' secondary schools nationwide, with the other two being Muda Hashim Secondary School and Ma'had Islam Brunei (Brunei Islamic College). The school provides five years of secondary education leading up to GCE 'O' Level and IGCSE qualification.

== Namesake ==
The school is named in honour of Sultan Omar Ali Saifuddien III. Brunei saw substantial changes under the 17-year rule of the late Sultan. The Melayu Islam Beraja (MIB) concept, which serves as the nation's guiding ideology, was also developed by him. He also initiated social and economic reform to ready his people for the restoration of the state's sovereign powers, which had been initiated by his predecessor and sparked by the Brunei nationalist movement around the end of World War II.

== History ==
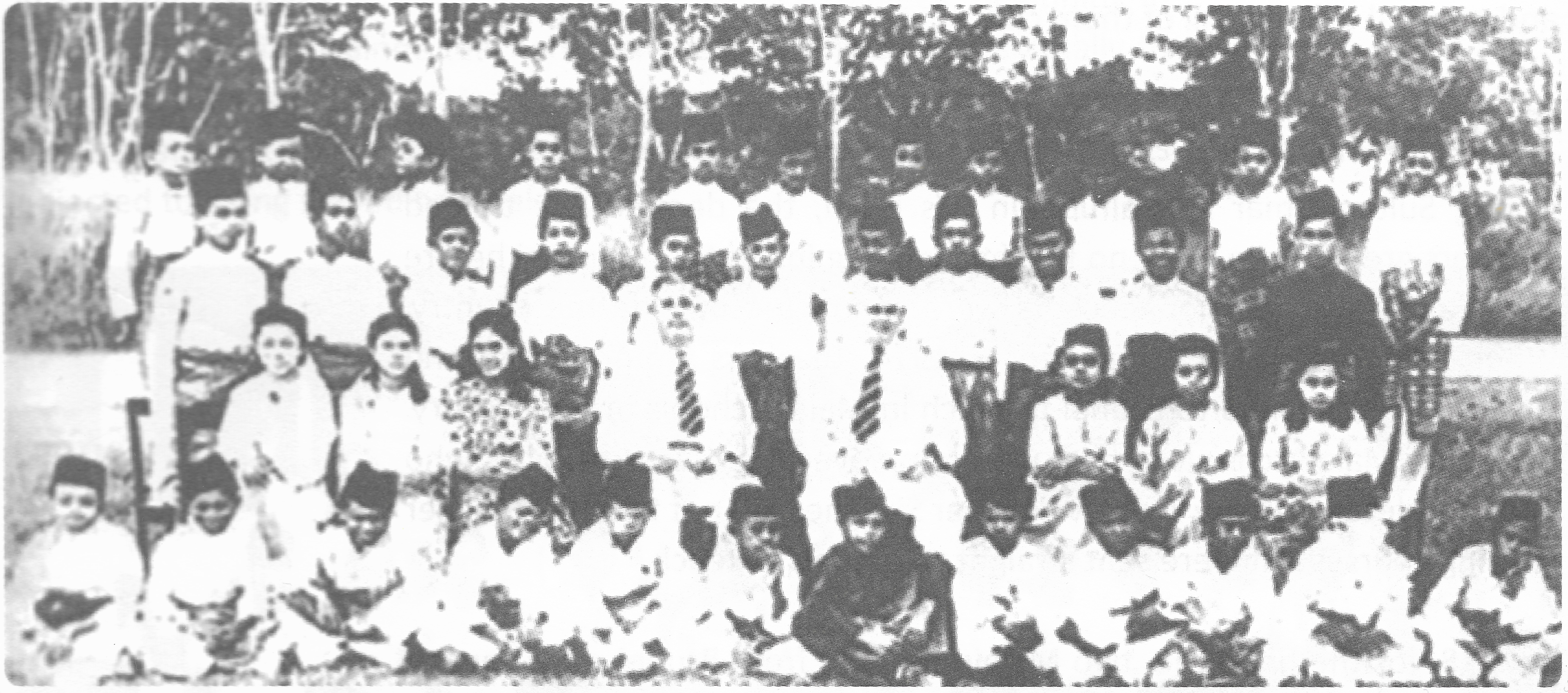
The school's first and second intakes in 1952

In Brunei, there was only access to primary education prior to World War II. The government of Brunei established the Education Department in 1951. To encourage English education among Bruneians, the Brunei Town Government English School was founded in Brunei Town on 15 October 1951. Two qualified instructors, one from Malaya and one from the United Kingdom, worked at the school. Their choices—likely made in conjunction with the State Education Officer—have had a long-lasting effect on Brunei's educational system, as seen by the numerous practices that were implemented at the time and are still in use today.

At the time of the establishment, the school functioned as a preparatory school. It was also the first government school in the country which provided education in the English language. Since Brunei did not have an official English education system, the school did not initially have any students. As a result, English courses were introduced at Primary 4 at four chosen primary schools. The age at which English-medium education started in Brunei was set by the more gifted students who got extra tuition from the State Education Officer prior to starting school.

The school eventually renamed to Sultan Omar Ali Saifuddien College in 1955. It later became the first school to provide secondary education in the country. It was gradually implemented, beginning in 1953 with the introduction of Form 1. By 1957, the school had all five years of the secondary education and for the first time the Cambridge Overseas School Certificate examination, a precursor to GCE 'O' Level, was conducted at the school in that year for its Form 5 students. Because the British utilised Sultan Muhammad Jamalul Alam Malay School as a military base during the 1962 Brunei revolt, the school was temporarily moved to SOAS College.

SOAS College in collaboration with Army Cadet Team (Pasukan Kadet Tentera), created the SOAS College Military Cadet.

== Notable people ==
=== Notable staff ===
- Anthony Burgess, British writer and composer
- Roderick Yong, diplomat and educator

=== Notable alumni ===
- Sultan Hassanal Bolkiah, the current Sultan of Brunei
- Prince Jefri Bolkiah, a member of Wazir
- Prince Mohamed Bolkiah, a member of Wazir
- Prince Sufri Bolkiah, a member of Wazir
- Pengiran Anak Mohammad Yusof, a member of Cheteria
- Abu Bakar Apong, politician and a member of Manteri
- Abdul Rahman bin Ibrahim, politician and a member of Manteri
- Zakaria Sulaiman, politician and a member of Manteri
- Pengiran Umar, police officer and a member of Cheteria
- Abidin Abdul Rashid, politician and a member of Manteri
- Ali Mohammad Daud, politician and diplomat of Brunei
- Pengiran Mohammad Abdul Rahman, politician and writer of Brunei
- Hayati binti Mohd Salleh, lawyer
- Salbiah Sulaiman, politician and a member of Legislative Council
- Hamdillah Abdul Wahab, politician
- Goh King Chin, businessman and a member of Manteri
- Eusoff Agaki Ismail, politician
- Pengiran Bahrin, lawyer and a member of Cheteria
- Ong Tiong Oh, businessman and a member of Legislative Council
- Lim Jock Seng, politician and a member of Manteri
- Muslim Burmat, writer
- Pengiran Anak Muhammad Bey Muntassir, a member of Cheteria
- Ariffin Abdul Wahab, military officer and a member of Manteri
- Ya'akub Zainal, police commissioner and a member of Manteri
- Pengiran Shariffuddin, historian and monographer
- Matussin Omar, historian and writer
- Mahmud Saedon, Muslim scholar
- Mariam Abdul Aziz, former royalty
- Husin Ahmad, military officer and a member of Manteri
- Abdul Aziz Umar, politician and a member of Manteri
- Pengiran Asmalee, artist and diplomat
- Pengiran Ismail, politician and architect
- Yusoff Ismail, politician and diplomat
- Abdul Mokti Daud, politician and diplomat
- Judin Asar, civil servant and legislative councillor
Notable Sultan Omar Ali Saifuddien College Alumni

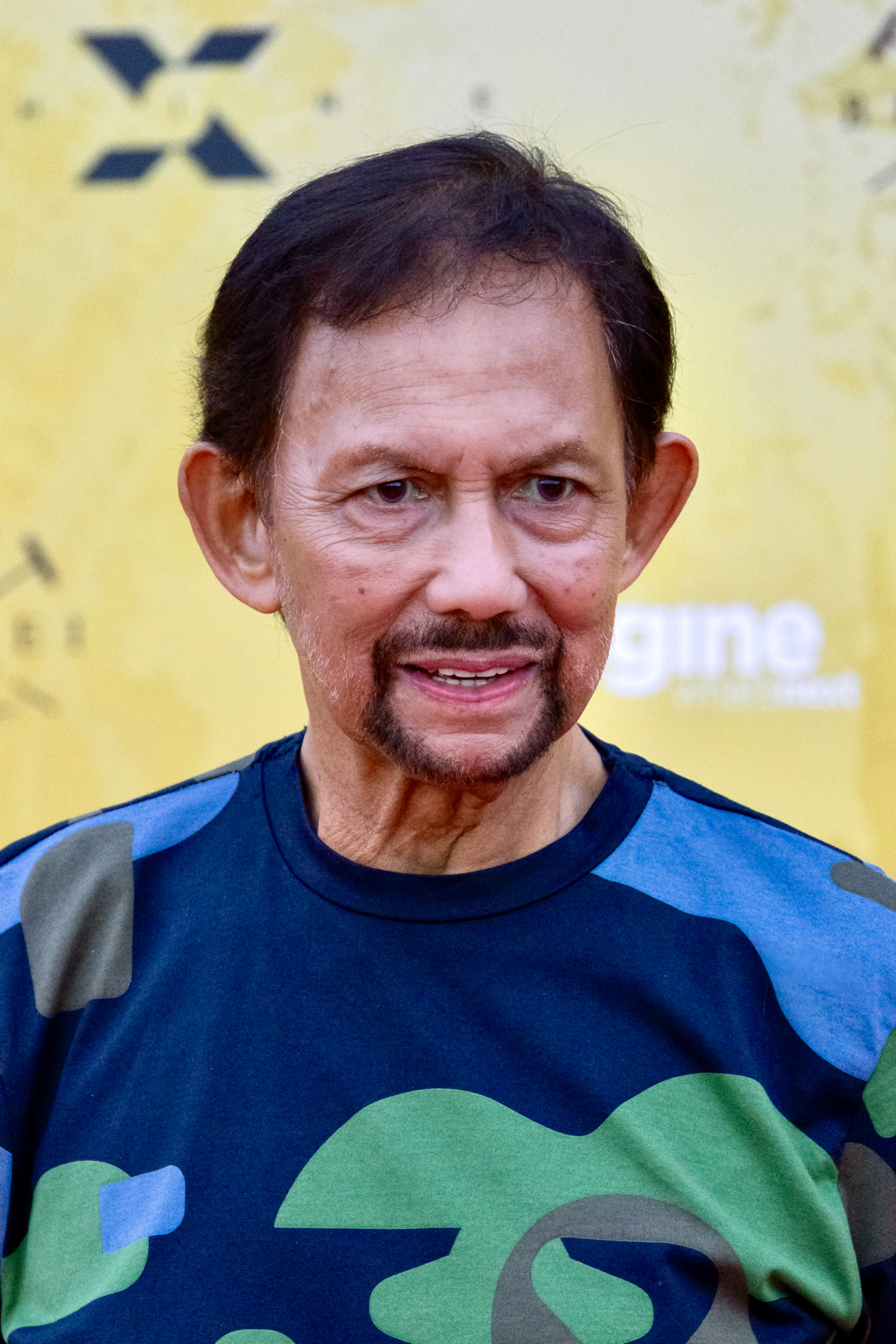
Hassanal Bolkiah, Sultan of Brunei

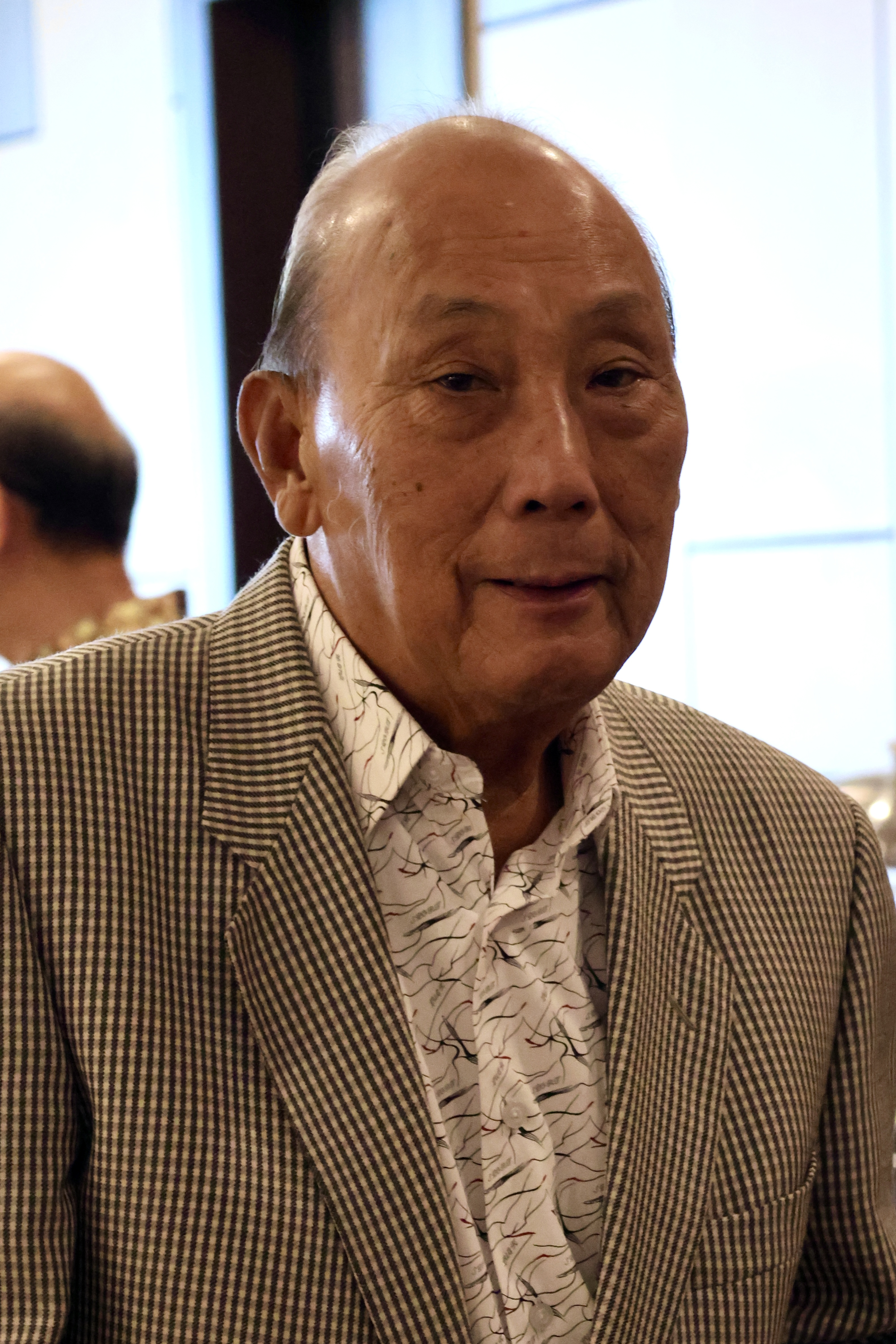
Goh King Chin, Member of Legislative Council of Brunei

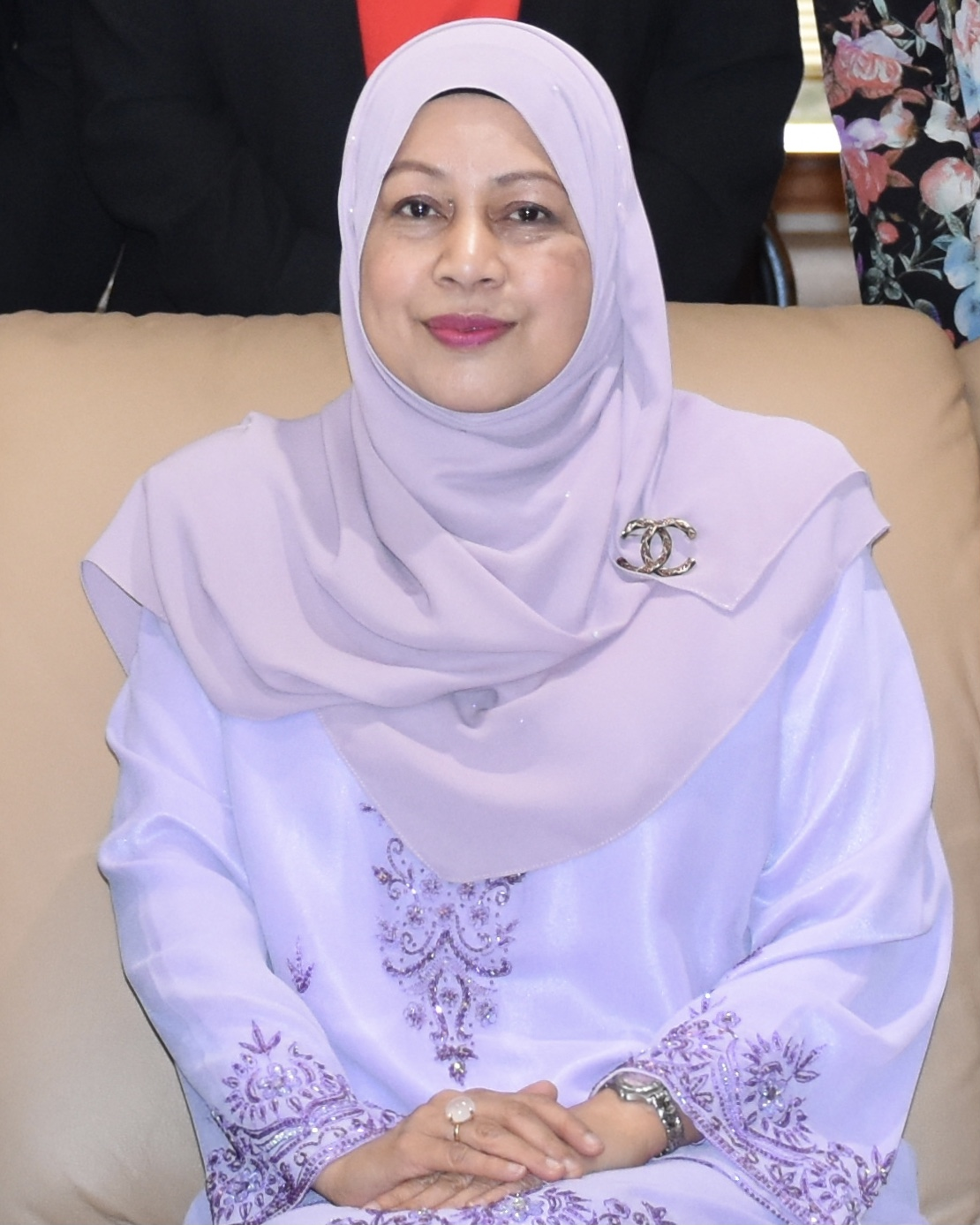
Hayati Salleh, 6th Attorney General of Brunei

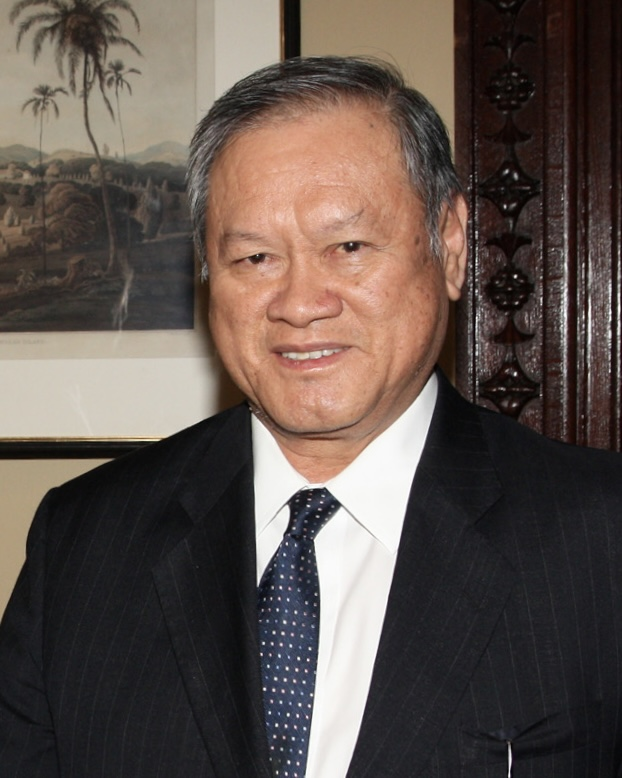
Lim Jock Seng, 1st Minister of Foreign Affairs and Trade II

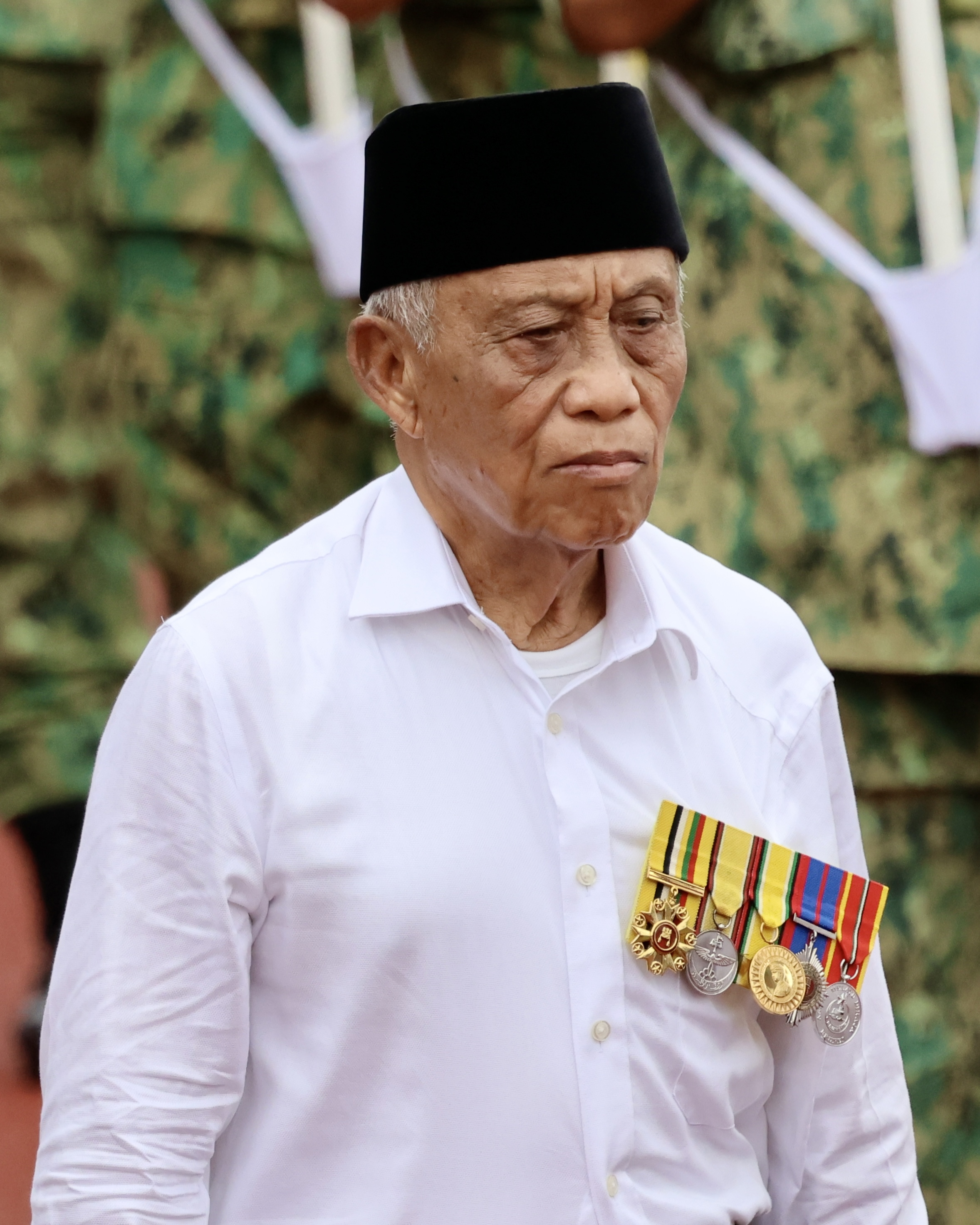
Ariffin Abdul Wahab, 2nd Commander of Training Institute Royal Brunei Armed Forces

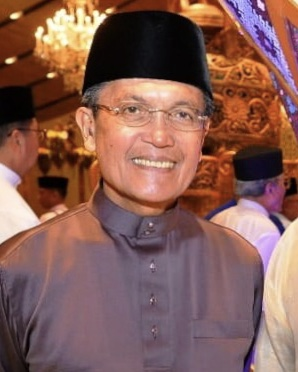
Abu Bakar Apong, 5th Minister of Home Affairs

== Gallery ==
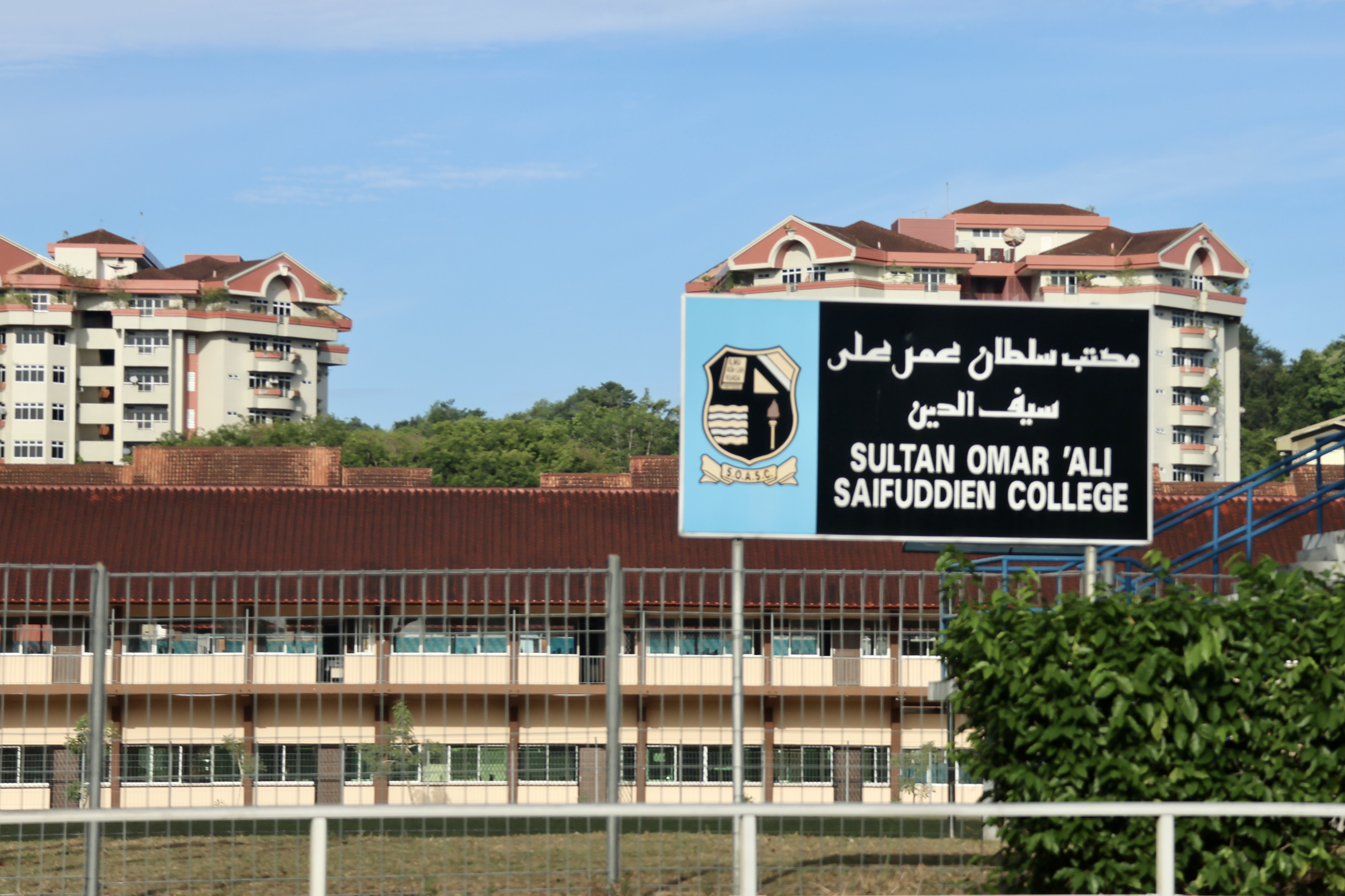
The college in 2023

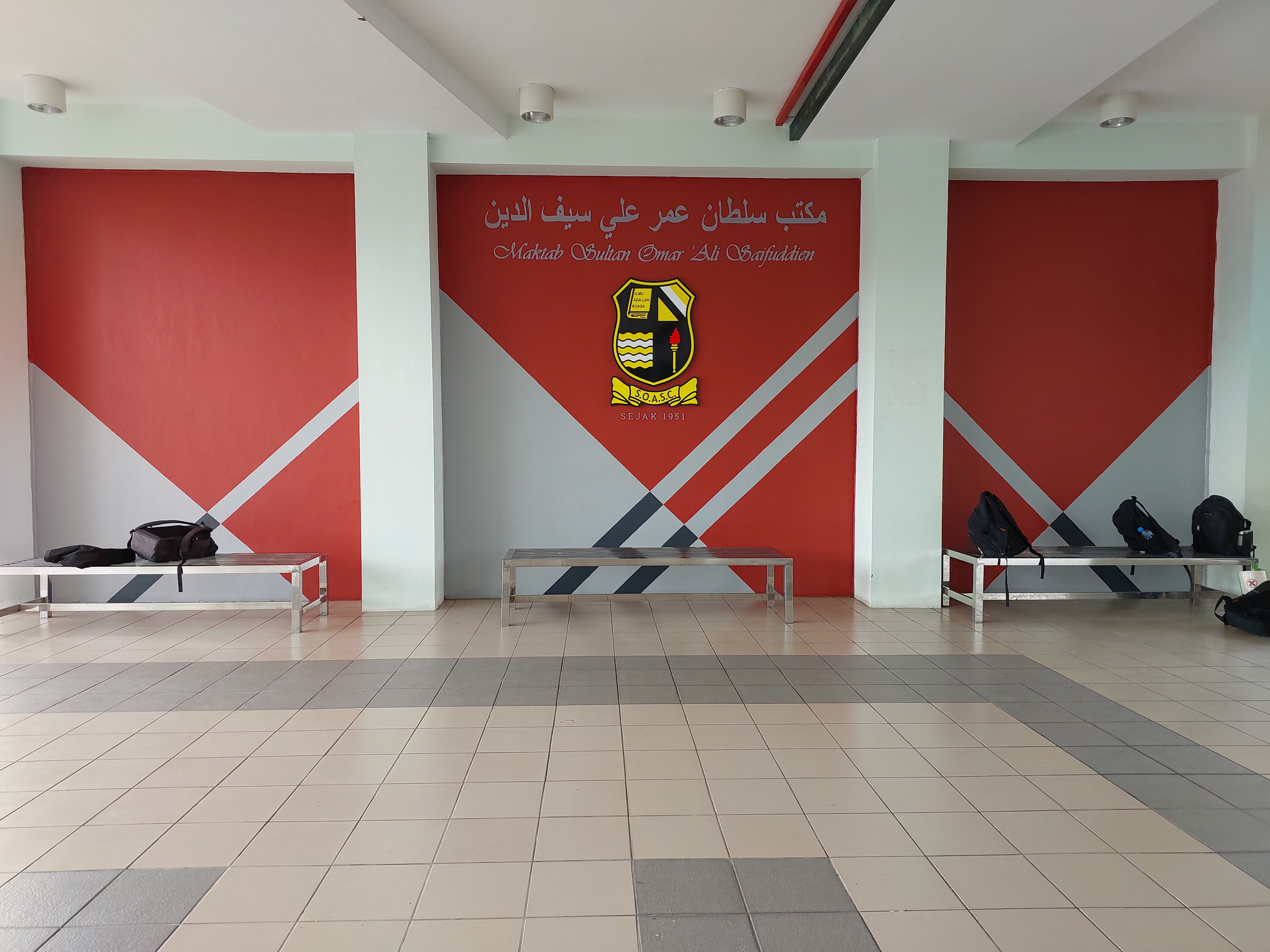
Interior of the college in 2024

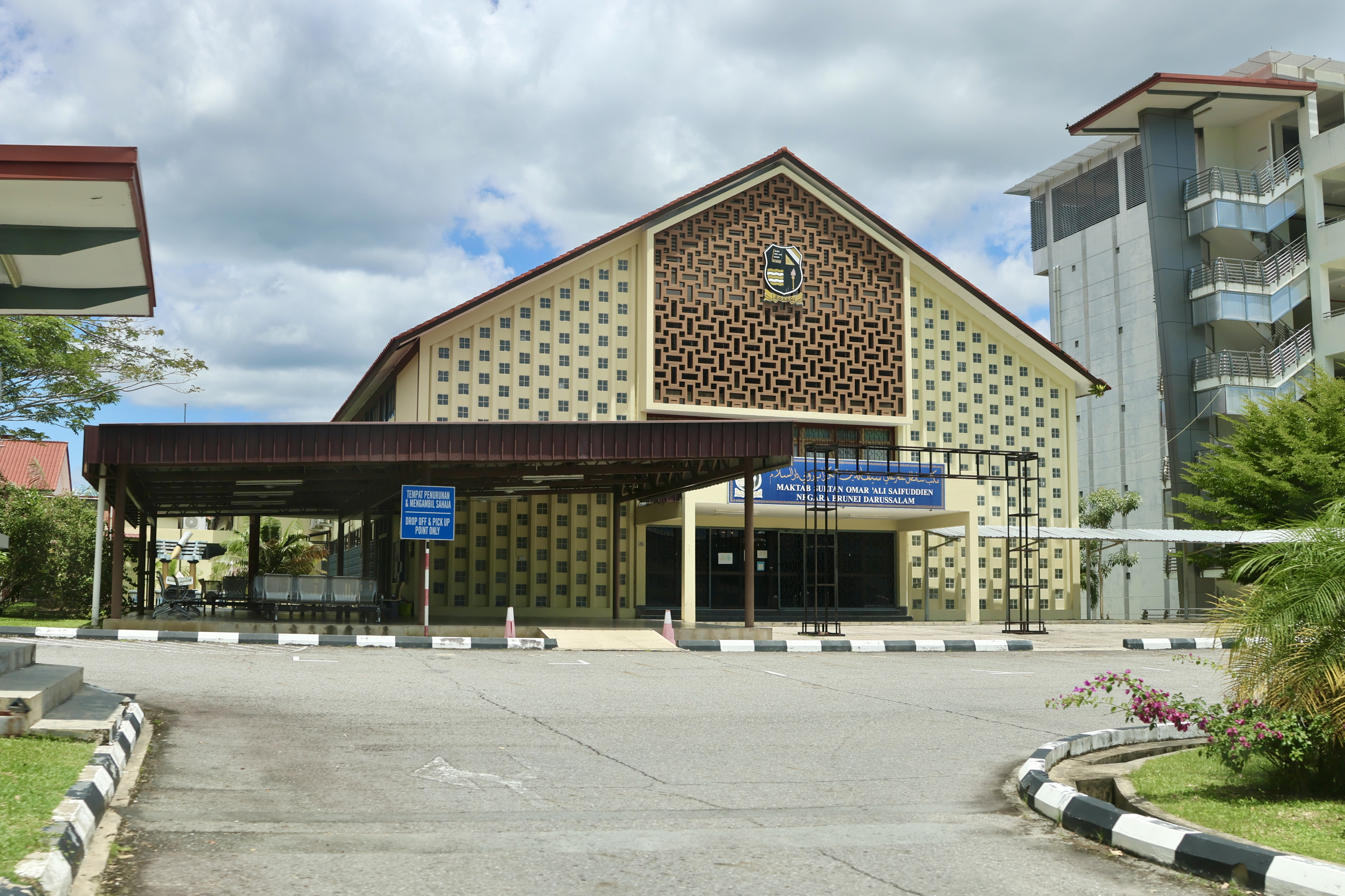
The auditorium

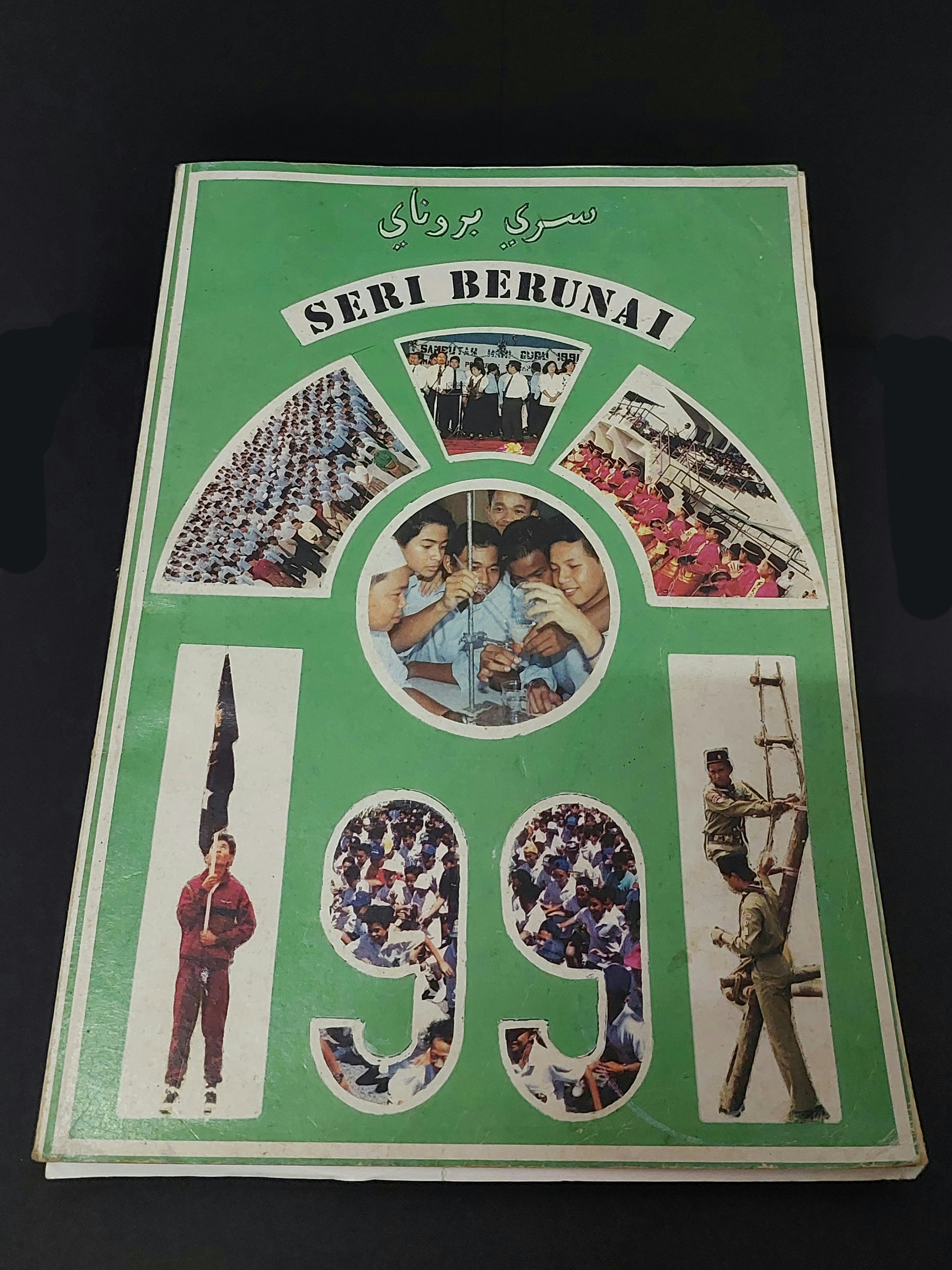
Seri Berunai magazine 1991

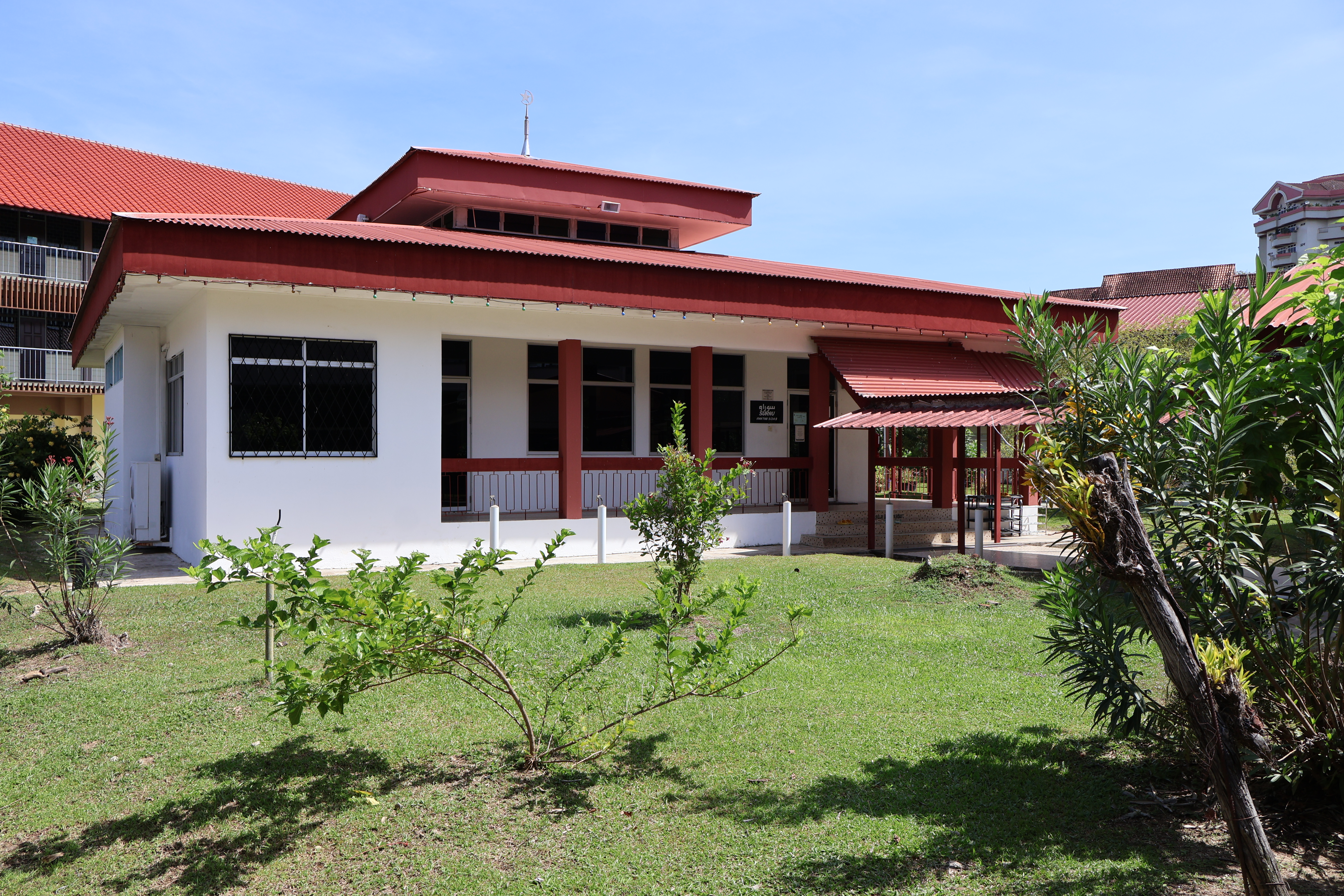
The College Surau

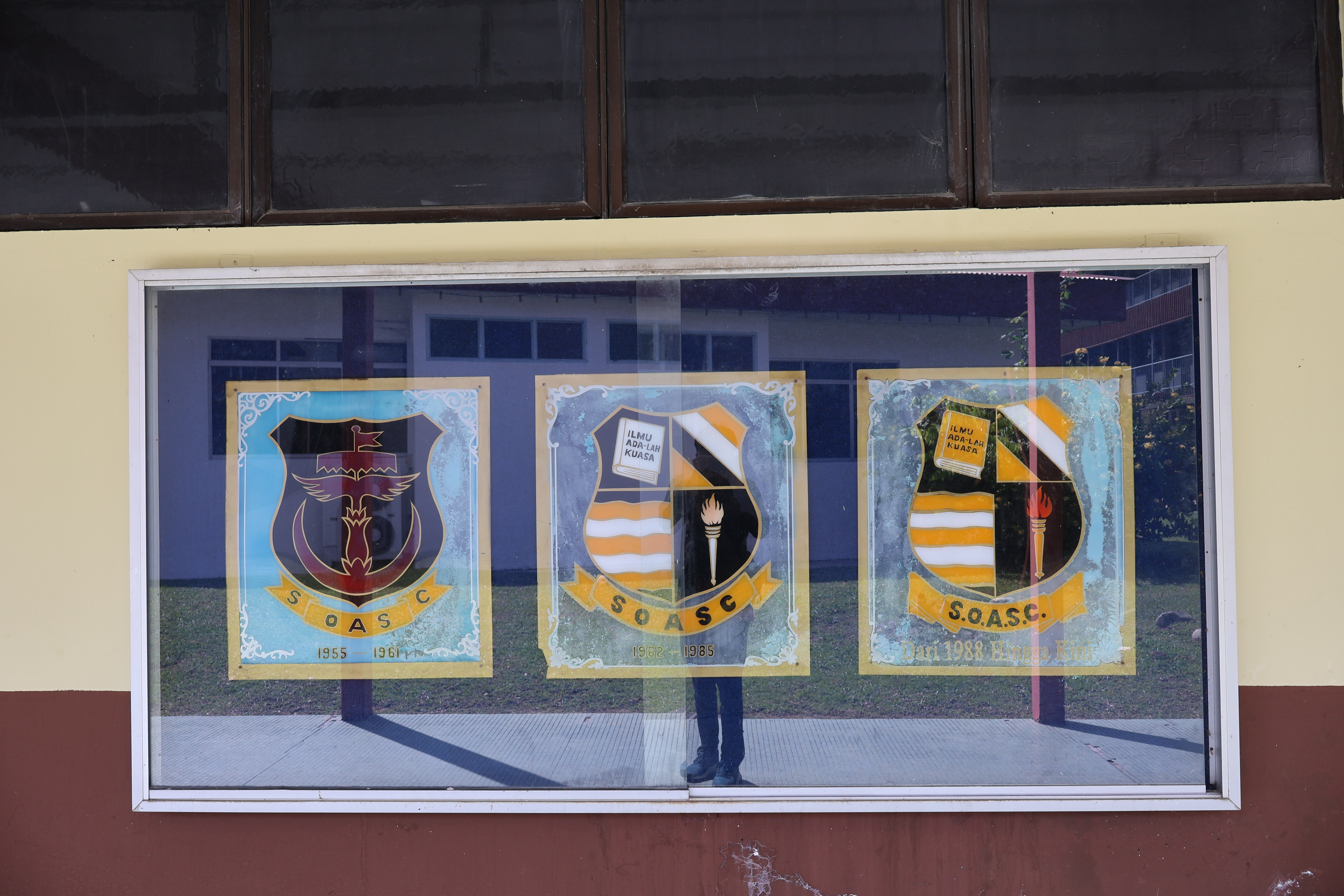
Changes in logo (Physical)

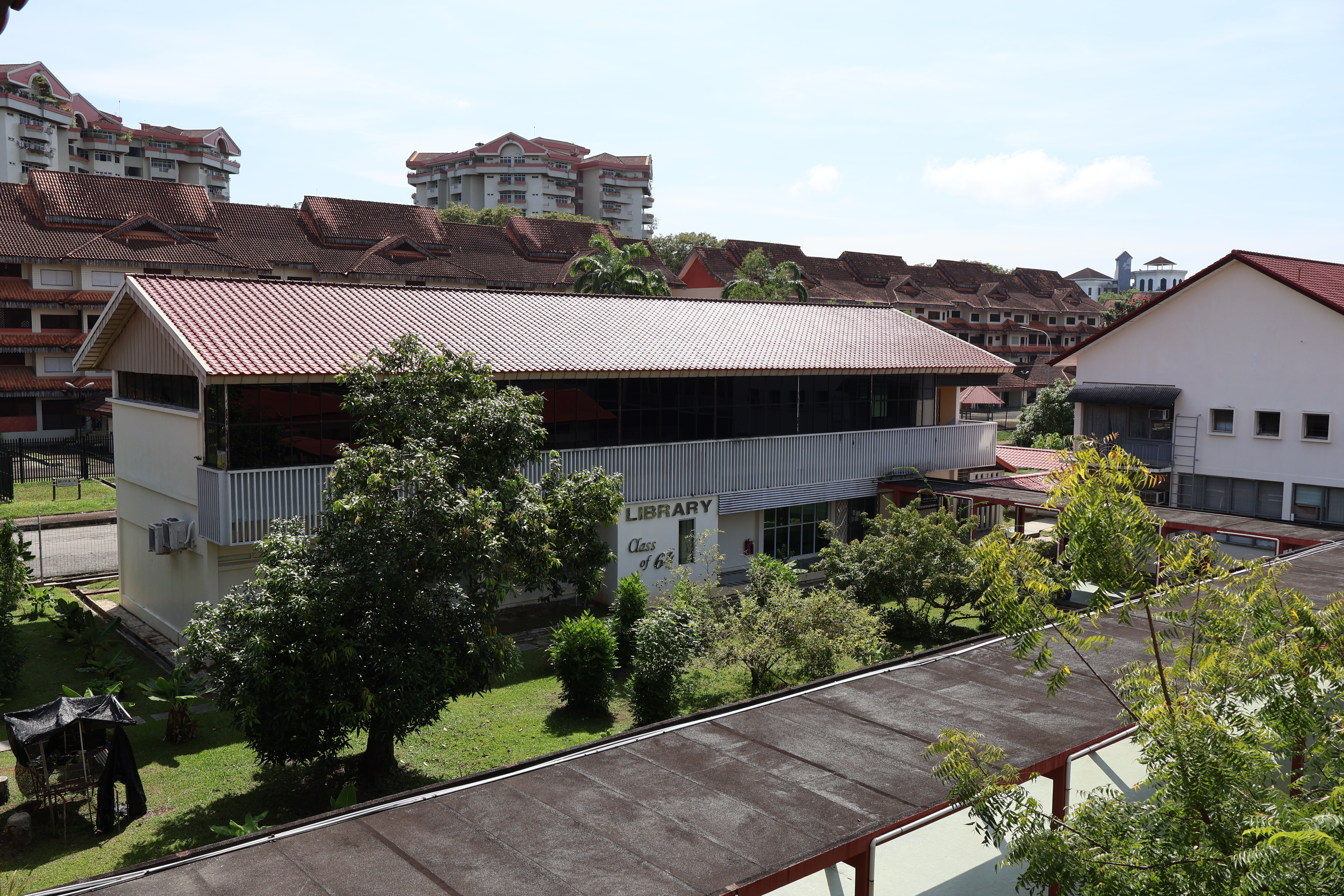
The College Library

== See also ==
- List of secondary schools in Brunei
- History of education in Brunei
