= Norman Saunders (politician) =

Turks and Caicos politician (born 1943)

The Honourable Norman Saunders
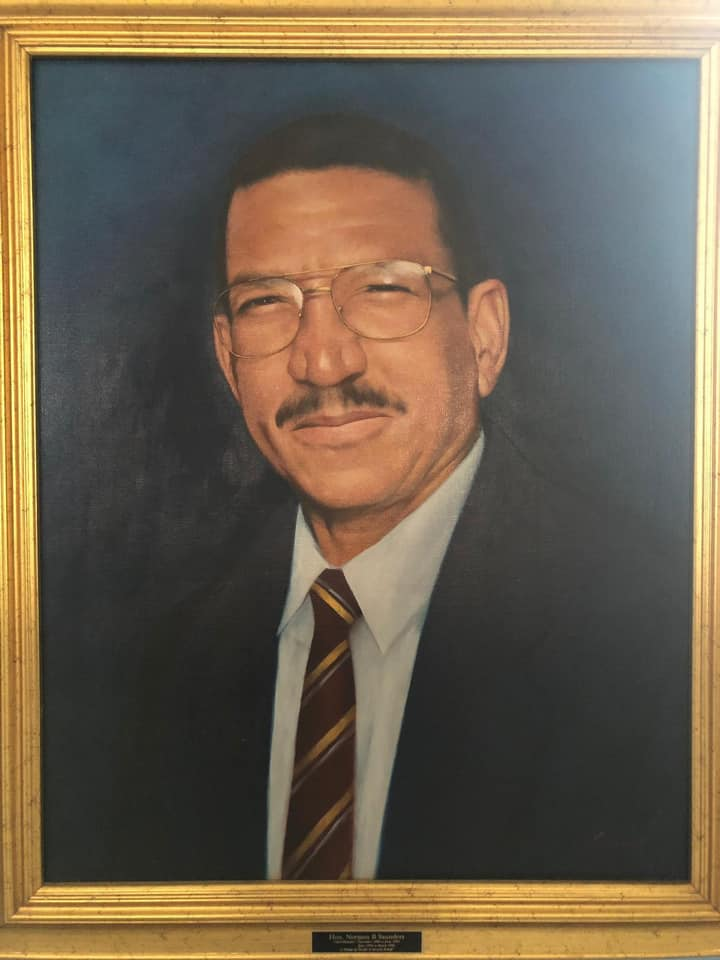
- Portrait of the 3rd Chief Minister of the Turks and Caicos Islands in the House of Assembly

3rd Chief Minister of the Turks and Caicos Islands
- In office 4 November 1980 – 28 March 1985
- Monarch: Elizabeth II
- Governor: John Clifford Strong; Christopher J. Turner
- Preceded by: Oswald Skippings
- Succeeded by: Nathaniel Francis

Leader of the Progressive National Party
- In office 29 September 1976 – 28 March 1985
- Succeeded by: Nathaniel Francis

Member of the House of Assembly for South Caicos South
- In office 2 February 1995 – 14 August 2009
- Preceded by: Emily Saunders

Member of the Legislative Council for South Caicos
- In office 29 September 1976 – 28 March 1985
- Succeeded by: Emily Saunders
- In office 9 November 2012 – 15 December 2016
- Succeeded by: Ruth Blackman

Personal details
- Born: 27 October 1943 (age 82)
- Party: Progressive National Party
- Spouse: Emily Saunders
- Children: Erwin Jay Saunders
- Nickname(s): NBS; Lil Fish; Father of Turks and Caicos Tourism

Hon. Norman Benjamin Saunders Sr. (born 27 October 1943) is a Turks and Caicos Islander former politician who served as the 3rd Chief Minister of the Turks and Caicos Islands from 4 November 1980 to 28 March 1985. Saunders is also the longest-serving Member of the House of Assembly in the Turks and Caicos Islands, nearing 50 years of service, the first Chief Minister to win consecutive elections in 1980 and 1984, the only politician in the nation to win as an independent candidate, and the first Leader of the Opposition. In the first election, the Saunders-led PNO secured the most votes, reflecting Saunders' strong public support.

== Initial political career ==
In 1967, Saunders was elected as a Member of the Legislative Council for South Caicos under the Progressive National Party at the age of 23, making him the youngest elected official at the time.

In 1976, after a 5–4–2 result in the election, and the two independent candidates siding with the People's Democratic Movement, Saunders became the first Leader of the Opposition in the Turks and Caicos Islands.

However, after 4 years, Saunders lead the Progressive National party to an 8–3 victory which resulted in the party getting re-elected as the government in 1985. At this point, Saunders led the party to both the largest mandate, and the first consecutive victory in the nation, which has only happened two other times in history.

== Father of Turks and Caicos Tourism ==
Saunders is recognised as the "Father of Tourism in the Turks and Caicos Islands", having played a pivotal role in laying the foundation for the nation's tourism industry in the 1970s. In 1969, following a decision by the Legislative Assembly to explore alternative industries to reduce financial reliance on the British Government, Saunders and John Wainwright were selected to undertake a regional research tour to study successful tourism models. They visited The Bahamas, the Cayman Islands, Barbados, the British Virgin Islands, and Martinique. The pair submitted a report recommending that the Turks and Caicos Islands pursue tourism development, citing its potential to generate new government revenue and create employment opportunities.

The House of Assembly accepted the report and subsequently established the Turks and Caicos Tourist Board in 1970, appointing Saunders as its first Executive Chairman. After a year of continued research and engagement with leading tourism experts, Hon. Saunders ultimately decided that the Turks and Caicos Islands should specifically pursue a high-end tourism model, which would allow for sustainable growth with a smaller volume of visitors and less impact on local infrastructure and ecology.

Saunders advocated for what he called “up-market” or “first class tourism,” aiming to attract affluent travellers who could support five-star accommodations and experiences without placing undue strain on local resources.

During his tenure, Saunders led negotiations with international hotel developers. In 1976, he played a key role in finalising an agreement with Club Med, which had previously been in talks with the Turks and Caicos Islands Government. This led to the construction of the first major resort in the Turks and Caicos Islands and marked a significant turning point in the territory's tourism development.

Reflecting on this period during the ceremony at which the South Caicos Airport was renamed the Norman B. Saunders Sr. International Airport, Saunders stated:

“The Tourism Industry was my baby. The House of Assembly actually gave me complete authority to do what was necessary to develop the tourism industry... I credit myself for the type of tourism that we developed in this country. Tourism is the breadbasket of this country, and I consider myself responsible for that area of our economic development.”

== Co-founding the Progressive National Party, and the shift to Ministerial government ==
In the years leading up to the 1976 General Election, Saunders played a role in the creation of a formal party system in the Turks and Caicos Islands and in transitioning the territory from a colonial administrative structure to Ministerial Government. During the 1972–1976 Legislative Term, elected members grew increasingly frustrated by the limitations of the bicameral system, in which real authority remained with British-appointed administrators. This led to a united push for constitutional reform aimed at granting elected officials genuine decision-making power.

In 1975, a delegation of elected members entered into negotiations with the British Government to draft a more modern constitution. On the advice of Ivan Buchanan, the group retained the services of renowned constitutional lawyer Billy Herbert to support their efforts. In a move that enabled the negotiations, Saunders personally financed the hiring of Herbert after public donations fell short. A substantial private contribution from businessman Robin Laing further supported the effort. The resulting 1976 Constitution established Ministerial Government for the first time in the Turks and Caicos Islands, enabling the formation of an elected Cabinet led by a Chief Minister.

Following the constitutional changes, Saunders and several other sitting legislators recognised the need for political organisation and co-founded the Progressive National Organization (PNO), later renamed the Progressive National Party (PNP). At a special meeting in Grand Turk, the public strongly urged the selection of a leader before the upcoming election. Initially expected to be a contest between Saunders and Francis, the latter withdrew his nomination, stating that Saunders had “everything to make an able leader of the party.” This led to unanimous support for Saunders as the Progressive National Organization's first leader.

== Conspiracy conviction ==
Saunders was arrested in March 1985 together with Commerce and Development Minister Stafford Missick. Saunders was alleged by the US Drug Enforcement Administration to have accepted $30,000 from undercover agents to ensure safe passage of drugs by permitting safe stopover refuelling of drug flights from Colombia to the United States. Video evidence showed Saunders accepting $20,000 from an agent. Saunders was convicted in July 1985 of conspiracy, though he was acquitted of the charge of conspiring to import drugs into the United States (which Missick was also convicted of). He was sentenced to eight years in prison and fined $50,000.

== Later political career ==
After completing his prison sentence, in January 1995, Saunders was elected back to the Legislative Council as an independent candidate representing South Caicos South. Saunders wife, Emily, represented the South Caicos North seat.

In 2003, Saunders ran as a member of the Progressive National Party which formed the government.

In 2007, Saunders was a part of, at the time, the largest mandate in the Turks and Caicos Islands' House of Assembly history, when the Progressive National Party won 13-2 seats.

Saunders ran as a member of the Progressive National Party and held his seat upon retirement in 2016.

== Norman B. Saunders Sr. International Airport ==
On 24 May 2024, the Turks and Caicos Islands Airports Authority (TCIAA) honoured the legacy of Saunders with a ceremony marking the official renaming of the South Caicos International Airport to the Norman B. Saunders Sr. International Airport. The renaming recognized Saunders’ decades of public service, particularly his pivotal role in shaping the nation's tourism sector and championing the development of South Caicos. Speaking at the ceremony, Hon. Saunders reflected on his contributions and highlighted South Caicos’ growing importance in the country's tourism sector, stating:

“Tourism is the breadbasket of this country... and we all believe that South Caicos will be the next big spot. It will be the next future area for tourism. I trust that this place will be a gateway to South Caicos and to some of the other islands.”

On 15 March 2025, American Airlines' inaugural direct flight from Miami to South Caicos (Flight AA 3815) landed at the Norman B. Saunders Sr. International Airport. Hon. Saunders brought remarks at the event stating,

"South Caicos is seeing a new day today, and I'm proud to be in the midst of it... But I would like to remind the audience that this is not the first international flight for South Caicos. We’ve had Southeastern Airlines fly here many, many years ago when there was only one international airport in the whole Turks and Caicos Islands. So, this is a return to our past days.

But truly, we are looking forward to a bright and prosperous future because I think this flight, and others that will follow, will do a lot to boost the economy of South Caicos. So, we take this opportunity to welcome all of you here. We hope you enjoy this day, and we trust that you will cooperate with the government and all other entities within the country that will be boosting tourism.

We want to do it right. That was what I told the Premier several weeks ago. We don't want to mess it up... so all of us have a responsibility to do what is right to make sure we control what is happening."

Political offices
Preceded by Oswald Skippings	Chief Minister of the Turks and Caicos Islands; 1980–1985	Succeeded by Nathaniel Francis
