= Turks and Caicos Weekly News =

Newspaper

The Turks and Caicos Weekly News, also known as the TC Weekly News, is a weekly newspaper serving the Turks and Caicos Islands. It was first published by editor and publisher W Blythe Duncanson in 1982.

== History ==
Turks and Caicos-born Duncanson had previously worked for Bahamian publications the Nassau Tribune and the Bahamian Review Magazine before returning to the T&C Islands in 1981. Arriving back, he saw the need for a magazine that would promote the unspoilt beauty of the Islands. He decided to set up the Turks and Caicos Current magazine, the first national publication of its kind in the Turks and Caicos. However, within a year Duncanson was confronted with a number of major news stories and realised that the Islands had an even greater need for a news publication.

In July 1982, Duncanson released the first edition of the Turks and Caicos Weekly News and shelved his magazine to be re-established at a later date. In 2007, the Turks and Caicos Weekly News celebrated its 25th anniversary and remains the "oldest, most reliable and most trustworthy newspaper in the TCI."

The Turks and Caicos Weekly News has published an online version since 2007.
