= Arthur Christopher Watson =

British colonial administrator (1927–2001)

Arthur Christopher Watson CMG

5th Governor of Montserrat
- In office 1985–1987
- Monarch: Elizabeth II
- Preceded by: David Dale
- Succeeded by: Christopher Turner

8th British High Commissioner to Brunei
- In office October 1978 – 31 December 1983
- Preceded by: James Davidson
- Succeeded by: Francis Cornish

2nd Governor of the Turks and Caicos Islands
- In office 1975–1978
- Preceded by: Alexander Mitchell
- Succeeded by: John Strong

Personal details
- Born: 2 January 1927 Republic of China
- Died: 7 May 2001 (aged 74)
- Spouse: Mary Candler (m. 1956)
- Children: 1 step daughter, 1 step son and 1 daughter
- Education: University of London (BA)
- Occupation: Politician; Diplomat

Military service
- Allegiance: United Kingdom
- Branch/service: Royal Navy
- Years of service: 1945–1948
- Rank: Sub-lieutenant
- Unit: Royal Naval Volunteer Reserve

Arthur Christopher Watson (2 January 1927 – 7 May 2001) was a British colonial administrator and politician who served as Governor of Montserrat, Governor of the Turks and Caicos Islands and the British High Commissioner to Brunei.

== Biography ==
Watson was born in China, and educated at Norwich School from 1940 to 1945, Selwyn College in 1945, St. Catherine's College from 1948 to 1950, and London University from 1950 to 1951. Earning his Bachelor of Arts (BA) in 1950 and Master of Arts (MA) in 1953. Then he had a short career in the Royal Navy from 1945 to 1948, becoming a sub-lieutenant in the Royal Naval Volunteer Reserve (RNVR). He began work with Her Majesty's Overseas Civil Service (HMOCS) Uganda from 1951 to 1963, becoming a District Officer at the same time in 1953. He retired as the Principal Assistant Secretary in 1961, Secretary in the Office of the Governor from March to October 1962, retired form HMOCS in 1963, and later First Secretary at the Commonwealth Relations Office on 4 June 1963, Consular in Karachi from 1964 to 1967, and the First Secretary to the Foreign and Commonwealth Office (FCO) In November 1967.

He served as Commissioner of Anguilla from 1971 to 1974. He was then the Governor of the Turks and Caicos from May 1975 until July 1978. He then served as Governor of Montserrat from 1985 until 1987. Watson was also the last British High Commissioner to Brunei before independence, serving from October 1978 until independence on 1 January 1984.

== Honours ==
- Order of St Michael and St George Companion (CMG)

Political offices
| Preceded by David Kenneth Hay Dale | Governor of Montserrat; 1985 – 1987 | Succeeded by Christopher J. Turner |
| Preceded by Alexander Graham Mitchell | Governor of the Turks and Caicos Islands; 1975 – 1978 | Succeeded by John Clifford Strong |
Diplomatic posts
| Preceded by James Davidson | British High Commissioner to Brunei; October 1978 – 31 December 1983 | Succeeded by Francis Cornish |
