= Ariel Misick =

Turks and Caicos Islands politician (born 1951)

Ariel Misick OBE
- Born: Ariel Rudolph Misick; 1951 (age 74–75)
- Education: University of West Indies; Inns of Court School of Law
- Occupation: Politician

Ariel Misick OBE (born 1951) is a Turks and Caicos Islands politician and former minister of development and commerce. He served on a four-member interim Advisory Council from July 1986 to 3 March 1988 after two previous Chief Ministers were forced to resign and ministerial government in the territory was suspended. He is now a partner at the law firm of Misick & Stanbrook. Misick was a member of the National Democratic Alliance.

Misick practices in Civil and Commercial Litigation and Constitutional Law and also in the area of Trusts Law, Banking, and Corporate and Commercial.

Misick is a graduate of the University of the West Indies and of the Inns of Court School of Law in London, and was called to the Bar of England and Wales in 1979 and to the Bar of the Turks and Caicos Islands in 1980. He founded the firm in 1981. He is the most senior advocate in the Turks and Caicos Islands, and has extensive experience in Turks and Caicos and also in England, appearing as an advocate in various appeals before the Privy Council.

Ministerial government resumed after elections were held in early 1988.

In the 1999 New Year Honours, Misick was appointed an Officer of the Order of the British Empire (OBE), in recognition of his public service.
