= Christopher J. Turner =

British colonial administrator (1933–2014)

Christopher John Turner, CBE (17 August 1933 – 30 October 2014) was a British colonial administrator and diplomat.

== Early years ==
He was born in Kingston upon Thames in 1933, the eldest of seven children, and later evacuated to Oxfordshire and then Cornwall during the Second World War. He attended Truro Cathedral School on a choral scholarship where he was Head Boy and Captain of the Rugby XV. Following school, Christopher served in the RAF as a Pilot Officer (Navigator) and trained in Canada. He then went up to Jesus College, Cambridge, to read English after which he completed the Overseas Civil Service Course for Administrative Officers.

== Career ==
In 1958 Turner joined the Colonial Service in Tanganyika as a District Officer rising to become the youngest District Commissioner in Africa. It was during this time that he married Irene Philomena de Sousa and together they had three children Paul, Eva, and Camilla.

Following Tanzania's independence, he was asked by President Nyerere to stay on. He became a regional Magistrate and, later, worked within the Ministry of Education. In 1970 he returned to the Colonial Service where he was stationed in New Hebrides as a District Agent. In 1978 Christopher was recognized for his work by being awarded the Order of the British Empire (OBE).

By the time New Hebrides became independent Vanuatu in 1980, he had been Financial Secretary and was Chief Secretary and Acting Resident Commissioner for the colony. Turner's popularity in the islands was such that his obituary was published in the national newspaper more than 30 years after his departure. He spent the next two years in Hong Kong as Senior Assistant Secretary. Turner was witness to the sun setting on some of the last parts of the British Empire.

In 1982 Turner was appointed Governor of the Turks and Caicos Islands. The islands were being used as a refuelling point for light aircraft plying the illegal supply route of narcotics from South America to the United States and, in conjunction with the American Drug Enforcement Administration, he played a key role in disrupting this traffic, and his success in this activity resulted in death threats being made against him, after which armed bodyguards were required for his protection.

In 1987 was appointed Governor of the island of Montserrat.

In 1990 he was appointed a Commander of the Order of the British Empire (CBE).

Later that year he retired from government service to enter the commercial world. He worked for McLane Company (USA) becoming the managing director of the UK office, and then in 1996 joined the Cambridge-Myers Consulting Group (USA) where as Senior Project Manager he travelled around the world.

== Later years ==
Turner retired in 2004 to live in Winchester, England where he continued to travel, garden, and entertain his seven grandchildren with tales of his exploits abroad.

Preceded by John Clifford Strong	Governor of the Turks and Caicos Islands; 1982–1987	Succeeded by Michael J. Bradley
Preceded by Arthur Christopher Watson	Governor of Montserrat; 1987–1990	Succeeded by David G. P. Taylor
