= Brunei Museum Journal =

Brunei Museum Journal is an academic journal, published annually by the Brunei Museum. Its first volume was produced in 1969.

The journal is dedicated to the advancement of knowledge of Brunei Darussalam, Borneo, and Southeast Asia. A large variety of topics are covered, including both the sciences and humanities subjects such as Archaeology, Ethnography and History.

Contributors include both Museum staff and individuals not affiliated with the Brunei Museum.

Between 1970 and 1986, the Brunei Museum Journal produced six monographs on a variety of subjects. In addition, from 1991 the Brunei Museum has published a number of 'Special Publications'.

== Monographs of the Brunei Museum Journal ==
- 1970 D. E. Brown Brunei: The Structure and History of Bornean Malay Sultanate
- 1974 Tom Harrisson Prehistoric Wood from Brunei
- 1979 Shaer Yang Di-Pertuan Sultan Muhammad Jamalul Alam Pehin Siraja Khatib Abdul Razak bin Hassanudin Transliterated from Jawi script
- 1980 H. G. Keith The United States Consul and The Yankee Raja
- 1982 R.W. Beales, D.J.Currie and R.H. Lindley Investigations into Fisheries Resources in Brunei
- 1986 Lim Jock Seng The Inter-relationship of Technology, Economy and Social Organization in a Fishing Village in Brunei
