= John Clifford Strong =

Former governor of the Turks and Caicos

John Clifford Strong CBE (14 January 1922 – 24 September 2003) was Governor of the Turks and Caicos from August 1978 to September 1982. Strong was succeeded by Christopher J. Turner in October 1982. He died in September 2003 at the age of 81.

Preceded by Arthur Christopher Watson	Governor of the Turks and Caicos Islands; 1978 – 1982	Succeeded by Christopher J. Turner
