= Cabinet of the Turks and Caicos Islands =

The Cabinet of the Turks and Caicos Islands comprises the ministers who advise the governor on government affairs. It was known as the Executive Council under the 1988 Constitution, and was given its current name in the 2006 Constitution. The Cabinet was disbanded in 2009 when self-government in the Turks and Caicos Islands was suspended. It was reconstituted after the 2012 election.

== Composition ==
The Executive Council under the 1988 Constitution consisted of five ex officio members—the governor, the chief minister, the chief secretary, the financial secretary, and the attorney-general—and four other ministers appointed by the governor, acting in accordance with the advice of the chief minister, from among the elected members of the Legislative Council.

The 2006 Constitution made three changes to this structure. First, it replaced the chief minister with the premier. It further removed the chief secretary and financial secretary as ex officio members, instead giving the governor the power to appoint six ministers (among whom one the governor appoints deputy premier in accordance with the advice of the premier). Finally, it removed the restriction that the appointed members be elected members of the legislature, instead stating that they may be either elected or appointed members of the House of Assembly.

The 2011 Constitution made smaller changes to the composition of the Cabinet: it added the deputy governor, and specified the number of appointed members to be "not more than six" rather than exactly six.

== Meetings ==
The governor presides over meetings of the Cabinet; in his or her absence, this responsibility falls to the deputy governor and then the attorney-general. The governor summons the Cabinet at his or her discretion, or when requested by at least four members. The 2006 Constitution lets the premier summon the Cabinet as well; the 2011 Constitution preserved that addition and also requires that the Cabinet meet at least once per fortnight.

Five members, among whom at least three are ministers, constitutes a quorum of the Cabinet. A minister who is absent from three consecutive Cabinet meetings without the prior permission of the premier is required to vacate his or her office.

== Powers ==
Since the 2006 Constitution, the governor has been required to consult the Cabinet before exercising any function with respect to defence, external affairs, the regulation of international financial services, and internal security (including the Police Force), but not appointment, termination, or disciplinary action regarding public officers. Furthermore, the governor is not obliged to act in accordance with the advice of the Cabinet, and the governor is excused from the obligation to consult the Cabinet in cases of public interest or urgent requirement to act. Finally, the 2011 Constitution added the new proviso that the governor has discretion to determine on his or her own whether a matter falls within one of the areas which requires consultation with the Cabinet.

The 2006 Constitution came in for criticism by the 2008 Commission of Inquiry which investigated corruption among members of the House of Assembly. The commission specifically pointed to the fact that, when compared to the 1988 Constitution, the 2006 Constitution gave cabinet ministers too much discretion and did not provide for sufficient checks and balances to prevent ministerial abuse.

The 1988 Constitution excused the governor from the obligation to consult with the Executive Council in a broader range of policy areas: not just appointment, termination, and displinary action regarding public officers as under the 2006 constitution, but also defence, external affairs, and internal security were left to the discretion of the governor. The governor was only required to keep the Executive Council informed of his actions in these regards, not to consult with them before acting. However, in those areas in which consultation was required it placed stricter limits on the governor's ability to act against the advice of the Executive Council. Specifically, the governor had to give thirty days advance notice to the Executive Council that they would act against its advice, and also had to obtain the consent of the secretary of state. An exception was given for cases demanding urgent action, but even then the governor would have to explain himself in writing to the secretary of state afterwards.

== Current cabinet ==
As of November 2022, the makeup of the Cabinet (in order of ministerial ranking) is:

Misick Ministry
Incumbent	Office(s)	Department	Constituency	Took office
Unelected Members
Dileeni Daniel-Selvaratnam	Governor	TCI Regiment	Appointed	29 June 2023 (2 years ago)
Anya Williams	Deputy Governor	Public Service	Appointed	15 October 2012 (13 years ago)
Rhondalee Braithwaite-Knowles	Attorney General	Attorney General's Chambers	Appointed	6 March 2014 (12 years ago)
Elected Members
Washington Misick	Premier Minister of Finance, Trade & Investment	Ministry of Finance, Trade & Investment	All Island District	24 February 2021 (5 years ago)
Jamell Robinson	Deputy Premier Minister of Planning and Infrastructure Development	Ministry of Planning & Infrastructure Development	All Island District	6 March 2024 (2 years ago)
Arlington Musgrove	Minister of Immigration, Citizenship & Labour	Ministry of Immigration, Citizenship & Labour	North & Middle Caicos	24 February 2021 (5 years ago)
Josephine Connolly	Minister of Tourism, Environment, Heritage, Maritime & Gaming	Ministry of Tourism, Environment, Heritage, Maritime & Gaming	All Island District	24 February 2021 (5 years ago)
Otis Chuck Morris	Minister of Home Affairs, Transportation & Communication	Ministry of Home Affairs, Transportation & Communication	Grand Turk North	24 February 2021 (5 years ago)
Rachel Taylor	Minister of Education, Youth, Culture & Library Services	Ministry of Education, Youth, Culture & Library Services	Five Cays	24 February 2021 (5 years ago)
Shaun David Malcolm	Minister of Health, Agriculture, Sports & Human Services	Ministry of Health, Agriculture, Food Services & Sports	All Island District	8 November 2022 (3 years ago)
Kyle Knowles	Minister of Public Safety & Utilities	Ministry of Public Safety & Utilities	Wheeland & West Caicos	6 March 2024 (2 years ago)

== List of Cabinets ==
- J. A. G. S. McCartney cabinet (1976–1980)
- Norman Saunders cabinet (1980–1985)
- Nathaniel Francis cabinet (1985–1986)
- Interim administration under direct British rule (1986–1988)
- Washington Misick cabinet (1988–1991)
- Oswald Skippings cabinet (1991–1995)
- Derek Hugh Taylor first cabinet (1995–1999)
- Derek Hugh Taylor second cabinet (1999–2003)
- Michael Misick first cabinet (2003–2007)
- Michael Misick second cabinet (2007–2009)
- Interim administration under direct British rule (2009–2012)
- Rufus Ewing cabinet (2012–2016)
- Sharlene Cartwright-Robinson cabinet (2016–2021)
- Washington Misick second cabinet (2021–2025)
- Washington Misick third cabinet (2025–Present)
