= Second W. Misick ministry =

Cabinet in the Turks and Caicos

- 2021-2025
- Date formed: 24 February 2021
- Date dissolved: 8 February 2025

People and organisations
- Monarch: Elizabeth II; Charles III
- Governor: Nigel Dakin
- Premier: Washington Misick
- Deputy Premier: Erwin Jay Saunders
- Member party: PNP
- Status in legislature: Supermajority
- Opposition party: PDM
- Opposition leader: Hon. Edwin Astwood (2021–present)

History
- Election: 2021 general election
- Predecessor: Cartwright-Robinson ministry
- Successor: Third W. Misick Ministry

The second W. Misick ministry began on 24 February 2021, four days after Washington Misick was sworn in as Premier of the Turks and Caicos Islands by Governor Nigel Dakin, where he invited him to form a new administration following the 2021 general election, in which the Progressive National Party was voted into power with a supermajority of 14 seats in the House of Assembly. Misick led government once before after the 1991 general election.

== Cabinet ==
=== November 2022 – present ===
As of November 2022, the makeup of the Cabinet (in order of ministerial ranking) is:

Incumbent	Office(s)	Department	Constituency	Time in office
Unelected Members
Dileeni Daniel-Selvaratnam	Governor	TCI Regiment	Appointed	29 June 2023 (2 years ago)
Nigel Dakin	Governor	TCI Regiment	Appointed	15 July 2019 - 29 March 2023 (3 years)
Anya Williams	Deputy Governor	Public Service	Appointed	15 October 2012 (13 years ago)
Rhondalee Braithwaite-Knowles	Attorney General	Attorney General's Chambers	Appointed	6 March 2014 (11 years ago)
Elected Members
Washington Misick	Premier		All Island District	24 February 2021 (4 years ago)
Erwin Jay Saunders	Deputy Premier Minister of Finance, Trade & Investment	Ministry of Finance, Trade and Investment	All Island District	24 February 2021 (4 years ago)
Josephine Connolly	Minister of Tourism, Environment, Heritage, Maritime & Gaming	Ministry of Tourism, Environment, Heritage, Maritime & Gaming	All Island District	24 February 2021 (4 years ago)
Jamell Robinson	Minister of Infrastructure, Housing & Planning	Ministry of Infrastructure, Housing & Planning	All Island District	8 November 2022 (3 years ago)
Arlington Musgrove	Minister of Immigration, Citizenship, Labour	Ministry of Immigration, Citizenship, Labour	North & Middle Caicos	24 February 2021 (4 years ago)
Otis Chuck Morris	Minister of Home Affairs, Transportation & Communication	Ministry of Home Affairs, Transportation & Communication	Grand Turk North	24 February 2021 (4 years ago)
Rachel Taylor	Minister of Education, Youth, Culture & Library Services	Ministry of Education, Youth, Culture & Library Services	Five Cays	24 February 2021 (4 years ago)
Shaun David Malcolm	Minister of Health, Agriculture, Sports & Human Services	Ministry of Health, Agriculture, Food Services & Sports	All Island District	8 November 2022 (3 years ago)

=== August 2021 – November 2022 ===
Second W. Misick Cabinet
Incumbent	Office(s)	Department	Constituency	Time in office
Unelected Members
Nigel Dakin	Governor	TCI Regiment	Appointed	15 July 2019 (6 years ago)
Anya Williams	Deputy Governor	Public Service	Appointed	15 October 2012 (13 years ago)
Rhondalee Braithwaite-Knowles	Attorney General	Attorney General's Chambers	Appointed	6 March 2014 (11 years ago)
Elected Members
Washington Misick	Premier		All Island District	24 February 2021 (4 years ago)
Erwin Jay Saunders	Deputy Premier		All Island District	24 February 2021 (4 years ago)
Erwin Jay Saunders	Minister of Finance, Trade & Investment	Ministry of Finance, Trade and Investment	All Island District	6 August 2021 (4 years ago)
Josephine Connolly	Minister of Tourism, Environment, Heritage, Maritime & Gaming	Ministry of Tourism, Environment, Heritage, Maritime & Gaming	All Island District	24 February 2021 (4 years ago)
Akierra Missick	Minister of Infrastructure, Housing & Planning	Ministry of Infrastructure, Housing & Planning	Leeward & Long Bay	24 February 2021 – 8 November 2022 (20 months)
Arlington Musgrove	Minister of Immigration, Citizenship, Labour	Ministry of Immigration, Citizenship, Labour	North & Middle Caicos	24 February 2021 (4 years ago)
Otis Chuck Morris	Minister of Home Affairs, Transportation & Communication	Ministry of Home Affairs, Transportation & Communication	Grand Turk North	24 February 2021 (4 years ago)
Rachel Taylor	Minister of Education, Youth, Culture & Library Services	Ministry of Education, Youth, Culture & Library Services	Five Cays	24 February 2021 (4 years ago)
Jamell Robinson	Minister of Health, Agriculture, Sports & Human Services	Ministry of Health, Agriculture, Food Services & Sports	All Island District	6 August 2021 (4 years ago)
