= Third W. Misick ministry =

Cabinet in the Turks and Caicos

- 2025–present
- Date formed: 13 February 2025

People and organisations
- Monarch: Charles III
- Governor: Dileeni Daniel-Selvaratnam
- Premier: Washington Misick
- Deputy Premier: Jamell Robinson
- Member party: PNP
- Status in legislature: Supermajority
- Opposition party: PDM
- Opposition leader: Hon. Edwin Astwood (2021–present)

History
- Election: 2025 general election
- Predecessor: Second W. Misick ministry

The third W. Misick ministry began on 13 February 2025, four days after Washington Misick was sworn in as Premier of the Turks and Caicos Islands by Governor Dileeni Daniel-Selvaratnam, where she invited him to form a new administration following the 2025 general election, in which the Progressive National Party was voted into power with a supermajority of 17 seats in Parliament.

== Cabinet ==
=== February 2025 – present ===
As of February 2025, the makeup of the Cabinet (in order of ministerial ranking) is:

Incumbent	Office(s)	Department	Constituency	Took office
Unelected Members
Dileeni Daniel-Selvaratnam	Governor	TCI Regiment	Appointed	29 June 2023 (2 years ago)
Anya Williams	Deputy Governor	Public Service	Appointed	15 October 2012 (13 years ago)
Rhondalee Braithwaite-Knowles	Attorney General	Attorney General's Chambers	Appointed	6 March 2014 (11 years ago)
Elected Members
Washington Misick	Premier Minister of Finance, Economic Development, Investment & Trade	Ministry of Finance, Economic Development, Investment & Trade	All Island District	13 February 2025 (11 months ago)
Jamell Robinson	Deputy Premier Minister of Immigration & Border Services	Ministry of Immigration & Border Services	All Island District	13 February 2025 (11 months ago)
Erwin Jay Saunders	Minister of Innovation, Technology & Information	Ministry of Innovation, Technology & Information	All Island District	13 February 2025 (11 months ago)
Arlington Musgrove	Minister of Physical Planning & Infrastructure Development	Ministry of Physical Planning & Infrastructure Development	North & Middle Caicos	13 February 2025 (11 months ago)
Otis Chuck Morris	Minister of Public Safety & Utilities	Ministry of Public Safety & Utilities	Grand Turk North	13 February 2025 (11 months ago)
Rachel Taylor	Minister of Education, Youth, Sports & Culture	Ministry of Education, Youth, Sports & Culture	Five Cays	13 February 2025 (11 months ago)
Shaun David Malcolm	Minister of Home Affairs, Religious Affairs & Transportation	Ministry of Home Affairs, Religious Affairs & Transportation	All Island District	13 February 2025 (11 months ago)
Kyle Knowles	Minister of Health & Human Services	Ministry of Health & Human Services	Wheeland & West Caicos	13 February 2025 (11 months ago)
Zhavargo Jolly	Minister of Tourism, Agriculture, Fisheries & the Environment	Ministry of Tourism, Agriculture, Fisheries & the Environment	All Island District	13 February 2025 (11 months ago)
