= Director of public prosecutions =

Office charged with prosecuting criminal offences

A director of public prosecutions (DPP) is the office or official charged with the prosecution of criminal offences in several criminal jurisdictions around the world. The title is used mainly in jurisdictions that are or have been members of the Commonwealth of Nations.

== Australia ==
Australia has a Commonwealth Director of Public Prosecutions, which was set up by the Director of Public Prosecutions Act 1983 and started operations in 1984. The eight states and territories of Australia also have their own DPPs.

The Office of DPP operates independently of Government. Ultimate authority for authorising prosecutions lies with the Attorney General. However, since that is a political post, and it is desired to have a non-political (public service) post carry out this function in most circumstances, the prosecutorial powers of the AG are normally delegated to the DPP.

It is common for those who hold the office of Commonwealth or State DPP later to be appointed to a high judicial office. Examples include Mark Weinberg, former justice of the Court of Appeal in the Supreme Court of Victoria; Michael Rozenes, Chief Judge of the County Court of Victoria from 2002 to 2015; Brian Martin, former Chief Justice of the Supreme Court of the Northern Territory; John McKechnie, former justice of the Supreme Court of Western Australia; and Paul Coghlan, former justice of the Supreme Court of Victoria.

== Belize ==
The Director of Public Prosecutions of Belize is the official responsible for the prosecution of criminal offences. The director heads the Office of the Director of Public Prosecutions.

== Canada ==
In Canada, the provincial Attorney General is responsible for the conduct of criminal prosecutions. The prosecutorial function is carried out by a division of the provincial public service, acting under the general direction of the Attorney General.

In Ontario, the local Crown Attorney's Office in the Criminal Law Division is in charge of criminal cases. Only British Columbia, Nova Scotia, and Quebec (a civil code jurisdiction) have a Director of Public Prosecutions office per se.

The Public Prosecution Service of Canada (PPSC) is a federal government organisation, created on 12 December 2006, when the Director of Public Prosecutions Act, enacted as part of the Federal Accountability Act, came into force. The Act split the conduct of federal prosecutions from the Department of Justice and created the Office of the Director of Public Prosecutions.

The PPSC fulfills the responsibilities of the Minister of Justice and Attorney General of Canada in the discharge of the Attorney General's criminal law mandate by prosecuting criminal offences under federal jurisdiction. In this regard, the PPSC assumes the role played within the Department of Justice by the former Federal Prosecution Service (FPS). The PPSC takes on additional responsibilities for prosecuting new fraud offences under the Financial Administration Act, as well as offences under the Canada Elections Act. Unlike the FPS, which was part of the Department of Justice, the PPSC is an independent organisation, reporting to Parliament through the Minister of Justice and Attorney General of Canada.

The PPSC is responsible for prosecuting offences under more than 50 federal statutes and for providing prosecution-related legal advice to law enforcement agencies. Cases prosecuted by the PPSC include those involving drugs, organised crime, terrorism, tax law, money laundering and proceeds of crime, crimes against humanity and war crimes, Criminal Code offences in the territories, and a large number of federal regulatory offences.

The creation of the PPSC reflects the decision to make transparent the principle of prosecutorial independence, free from any improper influence. The mandate of the PPSC is set out in the Director of Public Prosecutions Act. The act calls on the PPSC to provide prosecutorial advice to law enforcement agencies, and to act as prosecutor in matters prosecuted by the Minister of Justice and Attorney General of Canada on behalf of the Crown. In addition, the mandate includes initiating and conducting prosecutions on behalf of the Crown with respect to offences under the Canada Elections Act.

The PPSC reports to Parliament through the Attorney General of Canada. The Director of Public Prosecutions Act states that the Director of Public Prosecutions acts "under and on behalf of the Attorney General of Canada." The relationship between the attorney general and the director is premised on the principles of respect for the independence of the prosecution function and the need to consult on important matters of general interest.

Safeguarding the director's independence is the requirement that all instructions from the attorney general be in writing and published in the Canada Gazette. In turn, the director must inform the attorney general of any prosecution or planned intervention that may raise important questions of general interest, allowing the attorney general the opportunity to intervene in, or assume conduct of, a case. Additionally, the PPSC must provide the attorney general with an annual report for tabling in Parliament.

The first director of the PPSC was Brian J. Saunders. The current director of the PPSC is Kathleen Roussel.

== Hong Kong ==
The Director of Public Prosecutions (Chinese: 刑事檢控專員) of Hong Kong heads the Prosecutions Division of the Department of Justice, which is responsible for prosecuting trials and appeals on behalf of the Hong Kong Special Administrative Region, providing legal advice to law enforcement agencies on investigations, acting on behalf of the Secretary for Justice in the institution of criminal proceedings, and providing advice to bureaux and departments on measures to reform the criminal law.

The DPP is superintended by the Secretary for Justice, a political appointee, who is also accountable for the decisions of the DPP. The position title was until the handover of Hong Kong to China on 1 July 1997 Crown Prosecutor. The Secretary for Justice and the Department of Justice were, until 1997, named the Attorney General and the Legal Department, respectively.

== India ==
- State of Kerala
  - Directorate of Prosecution, Kerala Director General of Prosecution of Kerala heads the Prosecution Directorate of Department of Home, which is responsible for prosecuting trials and appeals on behalf of the state, providing legal advice to law enforcement agencies on investigations, supervision and control of prosecution machinery in the state, and providing advice to bureaux and departments on measures to reform the criminal law. The DGP is assisted by a Director of Prosecution at headquarters, Deputy Directors of Prosecution in districts and Assistant Public Prosecutors in various courts of the state.

== Ireland ==
The Director of Public Prosecutions has been responsible for prosecution of all indictable criminal offences in Ireland since the enactment of the Prosecution of Offences Act 1974. Before 1974 all crimes and offences were prosecuted at the suit of (after action taken by) the attorney general. The DPP may also issue a certificate that a case should be referred to the Special Criminal Court, a juryless trial court usually reserved for terrorists and organised criminals.

The current director is Catherine Pierse. James Hamilton, who had served as DPP for 12 years, announced in July 2011 that he would be taking early retirement and stepped down in November 2011.

List of DPPs since 1974:

- 1974–1999 Eamonn Barnes
- 1999–2011 James Hamilton
- 2011–2021 Claire Loftus
- 2021–present Catherine Pierse

The agency's headquarters is located on the southern edge of Phoenix Park, Dublin; in a group of historic buildings that used to be the Royal Military Infirmary before independence.

== Malawi ==
Malawi has a Director of Public Prosecutions. Malawi's Parliament’s Public Appointments Committee (PAC) approved Fostino Maele in 2025.

== Malta ==
During its review of the Constitution of Malta, the Venice Commission proposed to split the role of the Attorney-General (who, at the time, was both the principal legal adviser to the Government and the principal public prosecutor in the country) on the model of other Commonwealth countries: the Attorney-General would henceforth serve only as the Government's legal advisor, while their prosecutorial functions would be spun off into a new office of Director of Public Prosecutions. The actual amendments, however, split the role in the opposite way, the Attorney-General remains the chief public prosecutor, while legal advice to the government is provided by the State Advocate.

== Mauritius ==
The Mauritius sugar barons made representations during the colonial era to shield public prosecutions from political interference. The position of director of public prosecutions was enshrined in the Constitution of Mauritius when the country got its independence.

== Norway ==
In Norway the Director of Public Prosecutions (Riksadvokaten) is the head of the Norwegian Prosecuting Authority. The director has the coordinative leadership as well as the highest authority to prosecute criminal offences. The director is directly involved only in certain cases, such as crimes for which the maximum penalty is 21 years in prison. The director is subordinate to the Government Cabinet, however, the cabinet has never reversed a decision of the Director of Public Prosecutions. Jørn Sigurd Maurud is the current director and has been in that position since November 2019.

== South Africa ==
In South Africa public prosecutions are conducted by the National Director of Public Prosecutions (NDPP), the head of the National Prosecuting Authority (NPA). The NDPP is supported by a Chief Executive Officer, Deputies, Provincial Directors of Public Prosecutions, and several Special Directors.

== Trinidad and Tobago ==
The Office of the Director of Public Prosecutions (DPP) is an independent office established by the constitution which grants the power to undertake criminal prosecution against persons in any court in Trinidad and Tobago. The DPP, works with various Governmental, Non-Governmental and international agencies involved in prosecutions matters. The TTPS regularly consults with the DPP in criminal cases as the Director has the power to discontinue any criminal proceedings, whether started by the DPP or others, at any stage in the process. The current Director of Public Prosecution is Roger Gaspard, SC.

== United Kingdom ==
=== England and Wales ===
In England and Wales, the office of Director of Public Prosecutions was first created in 1880 as part of the Home Office, and had its own department from 1908. The DPP was responsible for the prosecution of only a small number of major cases until 1986 when responsibility for prosecutions was transferred to a new Crown Prosecution Service with the DPP as its head. The Director is appointed by the Attorney General for England and Wales.

The current DPP, since November 2023, is Stephen Parkinson.

=== Northern Ireland ===
In Northern Ireland a similar situation existed, and the Director of Public Prosecutions for Northern Ireland now heads the Public Prosecution Service for Northern Ireland.

The current DPP is Stephen Herron, who was appointed in 2017.

=== Scotland ===
Under Scots law the public prosecutor is the Lord Advocate who is the head of the Crown Office and Procurator Fiscal Service. All investigations by the police are nominally under the direction of the Lord Advocate and local procurators fiscal, and all prosecutions are carried out in the name of the Lord Advocate.

The current Lord Advocate is Dorothy Bain KC.

=== British Overseas Territories ===
In the Turks and Caicos Islands, the position of Director of Public Prosecutions was newly created by the 2011 Constitution. Prior to this, the Attorney-General had control over criminal prosecutions. The current Director of Public Prosecutions is Jillian Williams.

== See also ==
- Attorney General – Commonwealth and United States
- District Attorney – United States
- Crown Attorney – Canada, excluding Alberta
- Crown Prosecutor – Australia and England & Wales, Alberta
- Public prosecutor's office — Western and Central Europe, Asia, South America
