= Administrator of the Turks and Caicos =

Administrator of the Turks and Caicos was the administrator of the Turks and Caicos from 1859 to 1973. It replaced the previous post of Commissioner of the Turks and Caicos and was replaced by the Governor of the Turks and Caicos after 1973.

A list of administrators:

- Geoffrey Colin Guy (1921–2006) 1959–1965
- Robert Everard Wainwright (1913–1990) 1965, 1967–1971
- John Anthony Golding (1920–2012) 1965–1967
- Alexander Graham Mitchell (1923–2010) 1971–1973
