= Politics of the Turks and Caicos Islands =

Politics of the Turks and Caicos Islands takes place in a framework of a parliamentary representative democratic dependency, whereby as of August 9, 2006 the Premier is the head of government, and of a multi-party system. The islands are an internally self-governing overseas territory of the United Kingdom. The United Nations Committee on Decolonization includes the Turks and Caicos Islands on the United Nations list of non-self-governing territories. Executive power is exercised by the government. Legislative power is vested in both the government and the Legislative Council.

The Judiciary is independent of the executive and the legislature. Military defence is the responsibility of the United Kingdom.

The capital of the Turks and Caicos Islands is Cockburn Town on Grand Turk. The islands were under Jamaican jurisdiction until 1962, when they assumed the status of a crown colony. The governor of the Bahamas oversaw affairs from 1965 to 1973. With Bahamian independence, the islands received a separate governor in 1973. Although independence was agreed upon for 1982, the policy was reversed and the islands are presently a British overseas territory.

The islands adopted a constitution on August 30, 1976, which is Constitution Day, the national holiday. The constitution was suspended in 1986, but restored and revised March 5, 1988. A new Constitution was instituted in 2006, but was suspended in 2009 after the discovery of massive corruption and financial misfeasance by ministers. The territorial government was restored under a new Constitution after a general election in November 2012.

The territory's legal system is based on English common law, with a small number of laws adopted from Jamaica and the Bahamas. Suffrage is universal for those over 18 years of age. English is the official language.

== Executive branch ==
Since the islands are a British territory, King Charles III is the sovereign and head of state; the British Crown is represented by a governor.

The head of government is the premier. Under the 2011 Constitution, the cabinet consists of:

- the Governor;
- a Premier appointed by the governor;
- not more than six other Ministers (Education, Youth, Culture and Sports; Government Support Services; Finance, Investment and Trade; Health and Human Services; Environment, Home Affairs and Agriculture; Border Control and Labour) appointed by the Governor, acting in accordance with the advice of the Premier, from among the elected or appointed members of the House of Assembly, one of whom shall, in accordance with such advice, be appointed by the Governor as Deputy Premier; and
- the Deputy Governor and the Attorney General.

No direct elections are held for the executive; the governor is officially appointed by the British monarch. Legally, the premier is appointed to office by the governor - although under ordinary circumstances the premier will be (as are most parliamentary prime ministers) the head of the largest party in the House of Assembly.

Main office-holders
Office	Name	Party	Since
King	Charles III		8 September 2022
Governor	Dileeni Daniel-Selvaratnam		29 June 2023
Premier	Washington Misick	Progressive National Party	20 February 2021

== Legislative branch ==
The House of Assembly has 19 members, 13 members elected for a four-year term in single-seat constituencies, 3 members ex officio, 3 appointed members and a Speaker chosen from outside the council.

The Progressive National Party is the leading party in the legislature with People's Democratic Movement forming the official opposition.

== Suspension of self-government, 2009 ==
In compliance with the Order in Council issued by Queen Elizabeth II, on March 16, 2009 the Governor of the Turks and Caicos Islands, Gordon Wetherell, in a broadcast to the British territory, announced that the constitution would be partially suspended for two years following receipt of the final Commission of Inquiry report into government corruption.

On March 24, 2009, Premier Michael Misick resigned as Britain prepared to take direct administrative control of the territory. Misick, who had been at the centre of the corruption probe into the ruling elite, said in a statement he was resigning to give way to a unified government. In August 2009, the United Kingdom suspended the Turks and Caicos' self-government after allegations of ministerial corruption. The prerogative of the ministerial government and the House of Assembly were vested in the islands' incumbent governor, Gordon Wetherell, for a period of up to two years, which could be shortened or extended as necessary.

On 31 May 2009, the Commission of Inquiry, led by Sir Robin Auld, a former Lord Justice of the Court of Appeal of England and Wales reported to the Governor that it had found "a high probability of systemic corruption in government and the legislature and among public officers in the Turks & Caicos Islands in recent years. It appears, in the main, to have consisted of bribery by overseas developers and other investors of Ministers and/or public officers, so as to secure Crown Land on favourable terms, coupled with government approval for its commercial development." The report recommended investigation "with a view to prosecution" of five former Cabinet ministers (Michael Misick, Floyd Hall, McAllister Hanchell, Jeffrey Hall and Lillian Boyce) and made several recommendations for revisions of the Constitution and TCI laws to prevent a recurrence of corruption and misfeasance in government.

Following receipt of the review by the Governor, the Foreign and Commonwealth Office appointed Kate Sullivan to conduct a review and hold a series of public consultations with groups and invidividuals, and make recommendations for revisions to the TCI Constitution and various laws relating to belonger status, the electoral system, governmental transparency and accountability, and financial management of the territory.

In January 2012, Governor Ric Todd, who had been sworn in on 12 September 2011, published a set of eight "milestones" that would have to be met before elections could be held in the territory and self-government resumed. These milestones were prepared by FCO ministers in London and built upon the recommendations already made in the 2009 report and 2010 review mentioned above.

On 12 June 2012, British Foreign Secretary William Hague announced to the House of Commons in London that sufficient progress had been made towards the milestones that elections would be held in the Turks and Caicos Islands on 9 November. Hague also informed Parliament that

Thirteen people, including four former Ministers, have been charged with corruption and money laundering offences. An international arrest warrant has been issued for former Premier Michael Misick. It is now for the courts to decide whether the persons charged are guilty. The investigations and prosecutions will proceed independently of a future elected Government.

A civil recovery team was appointed to recover property and redress loses arising from corruption. The team has made significant progress including over 40 separate recoveries of money and/or land. Over US$12million has been recovered, including payments already made, judgements obtained and still to be collected, and agreements to pay. More than 900 acres of land have been returned to the Crown – valued in the tens of millions of US dollars. The team expects to recover significant further amounts of cash, land or other assets.

On 7 December 2012, it was reported that former Premier Misick had been arrested in Brazil on the request of the British government, who planned to seek his extradition back to the Turks and Caicos Islands to face corruption charges. Misick had reportedly been living "a sophisticated life" in the most exclusive neighborhoods of Rio de Janeiro since fleeing the TCI in 2009. Misick had previously denied any wrongdoing.

== Political parties and elections ==
The revised 2011 Constitution came into effect on 15 October 2012, restoring ministerial government to the territory. A general election was held on 9 November 2012. The result was a narrow victory for the Progressive National Party, which won 8 of the 15 seats in the House of Assembly despite winning fewer votes overall than the opposition People's Democratic Movement.

The leader of the PNP, Dr. Rufus Ewing, was sworn in as the territory's new Premier on 13 November in a ceremony on Grand Turk. According to a report in The Economist, the new Premier and others immediately launched criticisms of the period of suspended self-government:

The new premier, Rufus Ewing, honoured the local tradition of pillorying the governor, talking of “subjugation” and “enslavement” during the campaign. The opposition leader, Sharlene Cartwright-Robinson, claimed that during the democratic hiatus Mr Todd disregarded the civil service, political leaders and the clergy. Evangelical pastors complain about new equality legislation that they say protects gay rights. A value-added tax arouses the fury of business.

The new House of Assembly convened on 28 November 2012. In a speech to the House, Governor Todd announced that he would convene a commission to prepare the way for the territory's eventual independence from the United Kingdom, which both political parties agreed should be their goal.

== Foreign relations ==
Turks and Caicos participates in the Caribbean Development Bank, is an associate in Caricom, and maintains an Interpol sub-bureau. Defence is the responsibility of the United Kingdom. In December 2004, the Turks and Caicos Islands sought to become a new associate member to the Association of Caribbean States.

Since 1917, there has been significant political discussion in the Turks and Caicos and Canada about the possibility of unification. In 1973, the legislature of the territory formally requested association with its northern neighbor.

== See also ==
- Lists of political parties
- Electoral calendar
- Electoral system
