= Governor Jones =

Governor Jones may refer to:

- Brereton Jones (born 1939), 58th Governor of Kentucky
- Daniel Webster Jones (governor) (1839–1918), 19th Governor of Arkansas
- Glyn Smallwood Jones (1908–1992), 1st Governor-General of Malawi from 1964 to 1966 and 11th Governor of Nyasaland from 1961 to 1964
- James C. Jones (1809–1859), 10th Governor of Tennessee
- John Edward Jones (governor) (1840–1896), 8th Governor of Nevada
- Mervyn Jones (born 1942), Governor of the Turks and Caicos Islands from 2000 to 2002
- Robert Taylor Jones (1884–1958), 6th Governor of Arizona
- Sam H. Jones (1897–1978), 46th Governor of Louisiana
- Thomas G. Jones (1844–1914), 28th Governor of Alabama
- William Jones (governor) (1753–1822), 8th Governor of Rhode Island
