= Governor Mitchell =

Governor Mitchell may refer to:

- Alexander Graham Mitchell (1923–2010), 1st Governor of the Turks and Caicos from 1973 to 1975
- Charles Mitchell (colonial administrator) (1836–1899), 4th Governor of Fiji
- David Brydie Mitchell (1760–1837), 27th Governor of Georgia
- Henry L. Mitchell (1831–1903), 16th Governor of Florida
- Nathaniel Mitchell (1753–1814), 16th Governor of Delaware
- Philip Mitchell (colonial administrator) (1890–1964), 7th Governor of Uganda from 1935 to 1940, 16th Governor of Fiji from 1942 to 1944, and 18th Governor of Kenya from 1944 to 1952
- Robert Byington Mitchell (1823–1882), 7th Governor of New Mexico Territory
