= Governor Bourke =

Governor Bourke may refer to:

- Martin Bourke (born 1947), Governor of the Turks and Caicos Islands from 1993 to 1996
- Sir Richard Bourke (1777–1855), 8th Governor of New South Wales
- Richard Southwell Bourke, 6th Earl of Mayo (1822–1872)
