= Governor Bradley =

Governor Bradley may refer to:

- Lewis R. Bradley (1805–1879), 2nd Governor of Nevada
- Michael J. Bradley (colonial administrator) (1933–2010), Governor of the Turks and Caicos from 1987 to 1993
- William O'Connell Bradley (1847–1914), 32nd Governor of Kentucky
- Willis W. Bradley (1884–1954), Governor of Guam
