= Governor Kelly =

Governor Kelly may refer to:

- Harry Kelly (politician) (1898–1971), 39th Governor of Michigan
- John Kelly (diplomat) (born 1941), Governor of the Turks and Caicos Islands from 1996 to 2000
- Laura Kelly (born 1950), 48th Governor of Kansas
