= Robert Wainwright =

Robert Wainwright may refer to:

- Robert Wainwright (composer) (1748–1782), musician
- Rob Wainwright (rugby union) (born 1965), rugby union footballer
- Rob Wainwright (civil servant) (born 1967), former head of Europol
- Rob Wainwright (basketball) (born 1973), Filipino-American basketball player
- Robert Everard Wainwright (1913–1990), administrator of the Turks and Caicos
