= Director of Public Prosecutions (Turks and Caicos Islands) =

Public office in the Turks and Caicos Islands

The Director of Public Prosecutions is an officer of the Government of the Turks and Caicos Islands whose role is to prosecute criminal offences. The role was newly created by the 2011 Constitution.

== Overview ==
The DPP has the power:

- to institute and undertake criminal proceedings against any person before any court in respect of any offence against any law in force in the Islands;
- to take over and continue any such criminal proceedings that have been instituted by any other person or authority; and
- to discontinue at any stage before judgment is delivered any such criminal proceedings instituted or undertaken by himself or herself or any other person or authority.

The DPP is appointed by the Governor under Section 91 of the 2011 Constitution, in consultation with the Premier, the Leader of the Opposition, and the Judicial Service Commission. The Governor may remove the DPP only with the prior approval of the Secretary of State in two cases: for inability to discharge the functions of his or her office, or for misbehaviour. The constitution also lists the DPP as one of the "institutions protecting good governance". This has effects on remuneration, audits, and the funding of the Office of the DPP.

== History ==
Prior to 2011, the powers now associated with the Director of Public Prosecutions were vested in the Attorney-General. However, a report of the Turks and Caicos Islands Constitutional and Electoral Reform Project raised the concern about the "many hats" worn by the Attorney-General resulting in confusion over the proper functions of the role, and also pointed out that in other British Overseas Territories and Commonwealth countries these powers were typically vested in a separate Director of Public Prosecutions. Under the Turks and Caicos Constitution Order 2011, the Attorney-General continued to perform the functions of the office of DPP until a substantive DPP was appointed in accordance with the Constitution. The position of Attorney-General has been held by Huw Shepheard since 2010.

In September 2012, the Government put out job advertisements in industry publications such as The Lawyer to hire a DPP at a salary of US$125,000 per year. Applicants for the position were required to be qualified to practice law in a Commonwealth country or the Republic of Ireland. The advertisement also suggested that applicants have at least fifteen years' experience, and stated that the deadline for application was 10 October 2012. Other vacancy notices called for hiring a Deputy Director of Public Prosecutions with 10 years' experience at a salary of US$85,000 per year, as well as a Secretary who was a Belonger at a salary of US$18,900 to $20,520 per year. Ten people applied for the positions, of whom six were shortlisted. In December 2012, it was announced that JoAnne Meloche, a Canadian then employed as Deputy Director of Prosecutions in the TCI Attorney-General's Chambers, had been appointed as DPP and was scheduled to be sworn in the following February. Turks and Caicos Islander Angela Brooks was named Meloche's Deputy DPP.

== List of Directors of Public Prosecutions ==
- 2011–2013: Huw Shepheard (exercising the powers of DPP in his capacity as Attorney-General)
- 2013–2015: JoAnn Meloche
- 2015–2016: John Masters
- 2016–2018: Jillian Williams
- 2018-Present: Eugene Otunoye

== List of Deputy Directors of Public Prosecutions ==
- 2012–2013: Leonard Franklyn (acting)
- January–March 2013: Adrian Higgins of the United Kingdom (acting while Brooks remains on maternity leave)
- March 2013 – present: Angela Brooks
