= Mahala Wynns =

Mahala Wynns (born 4 October 1948) is a Turk and Caicos Islander politician who served as the Deputy Governor of the Turks and Caicos Islands (TCI) from 9 August 2006 to 15 October 2013. She was also the Acting Governor of the Turks and Caicos Islands in 2005 and 2008.

Wynns is the second woman to act as the Turks and Caicos Islands Governor. Her first tenure was from 21 June to 11 July 2005 with the departure of Jim Poston. She stepped down when Richard Tauwhare took office on 11 July 2005. Wynns's second tenure as acting Governor was from the time Tauwhare departed from the Turks and Caicos Islands on 16 July 2008 to the swearing of new Governor Gordon Wetherell on 5 August.
