= Director of Public Prosecutions (Ireland) =

Ireland governmental prosecution agency

Office of the Director of Public Prosecutions
- Irish: Oifig an Stiúrthóra Ionchúiseamh Poiblí

Agency overview
- Formed: September 18, 1974; 51 years ago
- Preceding agency: Attorney General of Ireland
- Jurisdiction: Ireland
- Headquarters: Infirmary Road, Dublin 7; 53.350060°N 6.296613°W
- Employees: 202 (2018)
- Annual budget: €44.8 million (2020)
- Agency executive: Catherine Pierse, Director of Public Prosecutions
- Website: dppireland.ie

The Office of the Director of Public Prosecutions is the principal public agency for conducting criminal prosecutions in the Republic of Ireland. It is led by the Director of Public Prosecutions (DPP).

The agency was founded in 1974, assuming prosecutorial functions previously held by the Attorney General of Ireland. It is responsible for conducting reviews of files prepared by law enforcement agencies including the Garda Síochána and deciding whether to prosecute. It conducts prosecutions in courts in Dublin and directs State Solicitors for cases outside Dublin. It instructs outside counsel to appear in court.

== History ==
The original powers of prosecution were vested with the Attorney General of Ireland under the Ministers and Secretaries Act 1924. Article 30.3 of the Constitution of Ireland provides that:

All crimes and offences prosecuted in any court constituted under Article 34 of this Constitution other than a court of summary jurisdiction shall be prosecuted in the name of the People and at the suit of the Attorney General or some other person authorised in accordance with law to act for that purpose.

The Prosecution of Offences Act 1974 delegated the functions of the Attorney General to the Office of the Director of Prosecutions. The Act was introduced to Dáil Éireann by the Government of the 20th Dáil. It was introduced by John M. Kelly, the Parliamentary Secretary to the Taoiseach Liam Cosgrave, with the stated dual aim of creating an impartial agency and to refocus the Office of the Attorney General to the provision of legal advice to the government. At the time, some politicians and members of the media suggested that there was "political patronage" given to barristers who were acting as prosecutors in trials. The new agency sought to address that. Most of the Act came into force on 18 September 1974.

Eamonn Barnes was the first DPP, appointed in January 1975 and holding the role until September 1999. During his tenure, the agency held a position of not revealing why some prosecutions were not taken. Barnes' retirement and his replacement by James Hamilton coincided with a change in policy, where a Victims' Charter was adopted and the office began issuing occasional reasons for non-prosecution.

The impartiality and discretion of the role of the DPP is intended to be protected through security of tenure. Barnes said that maintaining independence during his term was the largest struggle. During the process to appoint the successor to Barnes the government originally specified that the Director hold a seven-year term, which was later amended to original conditions. The term was changed to ten years for the appointment of the third director.

A unit devoted to tax offences was established in 2000 and a Special Financial Unit was established by the office in 2011 in response to the post-2008 Irish banking crisis.

Claire Loftus became the third DPP and first woman to hold the role in November 2011. The fourth DPP, Catherine Pierse, took over as DPP in November 2021.

The DPP published a report in 2019 which included responses to a report from the commission on the Future of Policing in Ireland. There may need to be "significant reorganisation of the prosecution service" due to recommendations to remove prosecution decisions from the Gardaí.

== Organisation ==
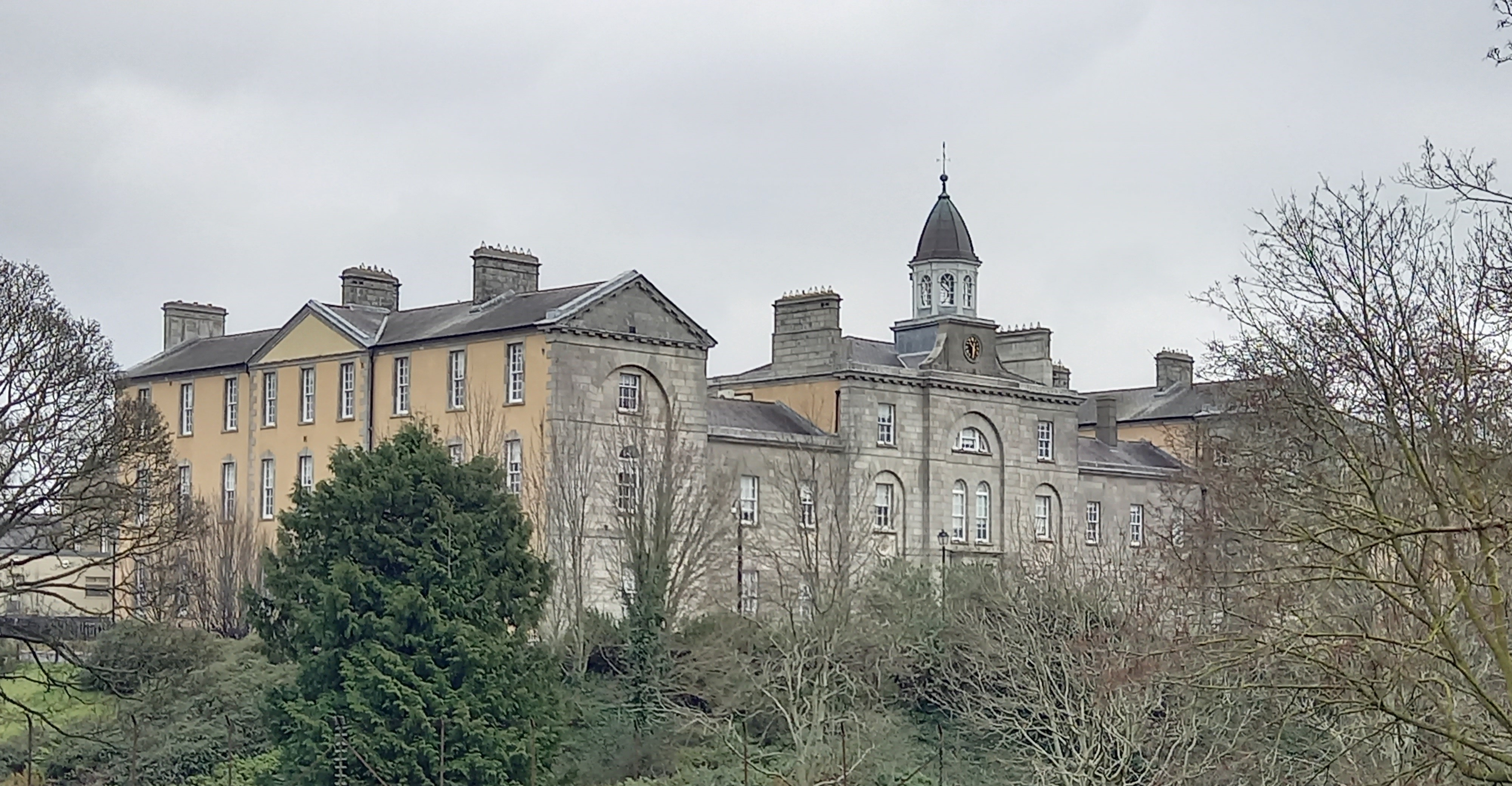
Office of the Director of Public Prosecutions Infirmary Road

The agency is led by the Director of Public Prosecutions. The Director is appointed by the Government of Ireland, who must have at least ten years of experience as a barrister or solicitor and is appointed a civil servant.

The Office has 202 staff and a budget of €44.8 million. The Director is assisted by a Deputy Director of Public Prosecutions and four units within the office including an Administration Division. Of the staff employed, 110 work as lawyers.

Barristers are selected by the DPP to be employed as prosecution counsel to conduct advocacy in courts. Fees for barristers in 2018 were €17.4 million.

The DPP oversees most prosecutions, especially since the Central Criminal Court is located in Dublin. It instructs Local State Solicitors for prosecutions which take place outside Dublin in the Circuit Court and occasionally in the District Court. These lawyers are retained on a contractual basis by county.

There were 14,854 files sent to the DPP in 2018.

== Functions ==
=== Overview ===
The functions of the DPP and the office are outlined in the Prosecution of Offences Act 1974. It requires the Director to deal with "criminal matters" which include overseeing criminal proceedings through the courts, applications arising from criminal proceedings or any connected other proceedings. The DPP is also required to deal with election and referendum petitions, and is predominantly non-criminal in nature.

=== Pre-prosecution ===
The Directing Division receives findings from investigations by the Gardaí and other enforcement agencies. It is frequently said that a "file has been prepared for the Director of Public Prosecutions" following an investigation. The Division decides if whether there should be a prosecution or whether to end a criminal investigation. It must decide if there is enough prima facie evidence that could result in a conviction.

The time taken to determine whether to charge varies depending on the complexity of the case. The DPP considers decisions to prosecute on the basis of the amount of evidence and what is judged to be in the public interest.

=== Prosecutions ===
The Solicitors Division is involved in the preparation of cases for trial and is led by the Chief Prosecution Solicitor. The DPP states its aim as being "to ensure that a just verdict is reached at the end of the trial process and not to strive for a conviction at all costs." Following the receipt of directions from the Directing Division, the Solicitors Division prosecutes cases in the District Court (if not delegated to a State Solicitor) or instructs counsel for higher courts. It responsible for preparing books of evidence, attending trial and liaising with parties and other agencies and dealing with appeals.

The DPP is empowered to decide if non-scheduled offences should be sent to the Special Criminal Court if it believes that juries in normal courts cannot deal with the offences adequately.

=== Extradition ===
Within the Prosecution Support Services Division, there is an International Unit which handles European Arrest Warrants, bilateral extraditions, and Mutual Legal Assistance requests.

=== Policy development ===
The DPP takes responsibility for providing research into prosecution policy and developing responses to criminal justice matters.

=== Victim support ===
The Criminal Justice (Victims of Crime) Act 2017 requires the DPP to engage with victims of crime and requires them to be included in decision-making. There is a right of review for decisions made by the DPP. A Victims Liaison Unit provides information to victims relating to a trial they are involved with.

== List of directors ==
- Eamonn Barnes (1974–1999)
- James Hamilton (1999–2011)
- Claire Loftus (2011–2021)
- Catherine Pierse (2021–present)

== See also ==
- Public Prosecution Service for Northern Ireland
