= Conch Bar Caves =

Coordinates: 21°49′34″N 71°47′28″W

The Conch Bar Caves, located on Middle Caicos, is the largest above-ground cave system in the Bahamas-Turks and Caicos Islands archipelago.

The caves are near their namesake village of Conch Bar. In the 1880s, the caves were mined for guano, which was exported as fertilizer. Many markings and etchings have been left by miners in the caves, many with names and dates. It was during this time of excavation that a number of Lucayan artefacts were discovered within the cave system.
