= Fish Ponds and Crossing Place Trail Important Bird Area =

Nature preserve in the Turks and Caicos islands

Coordinates: 21°50′38″N 71°50′09″W

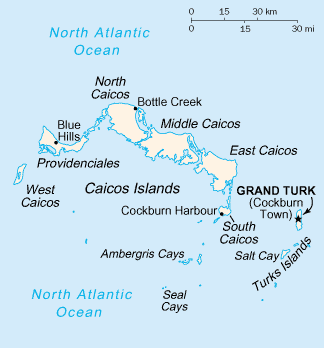
Map of the Turks and Caicos Islands showing the location of Middle Caicos

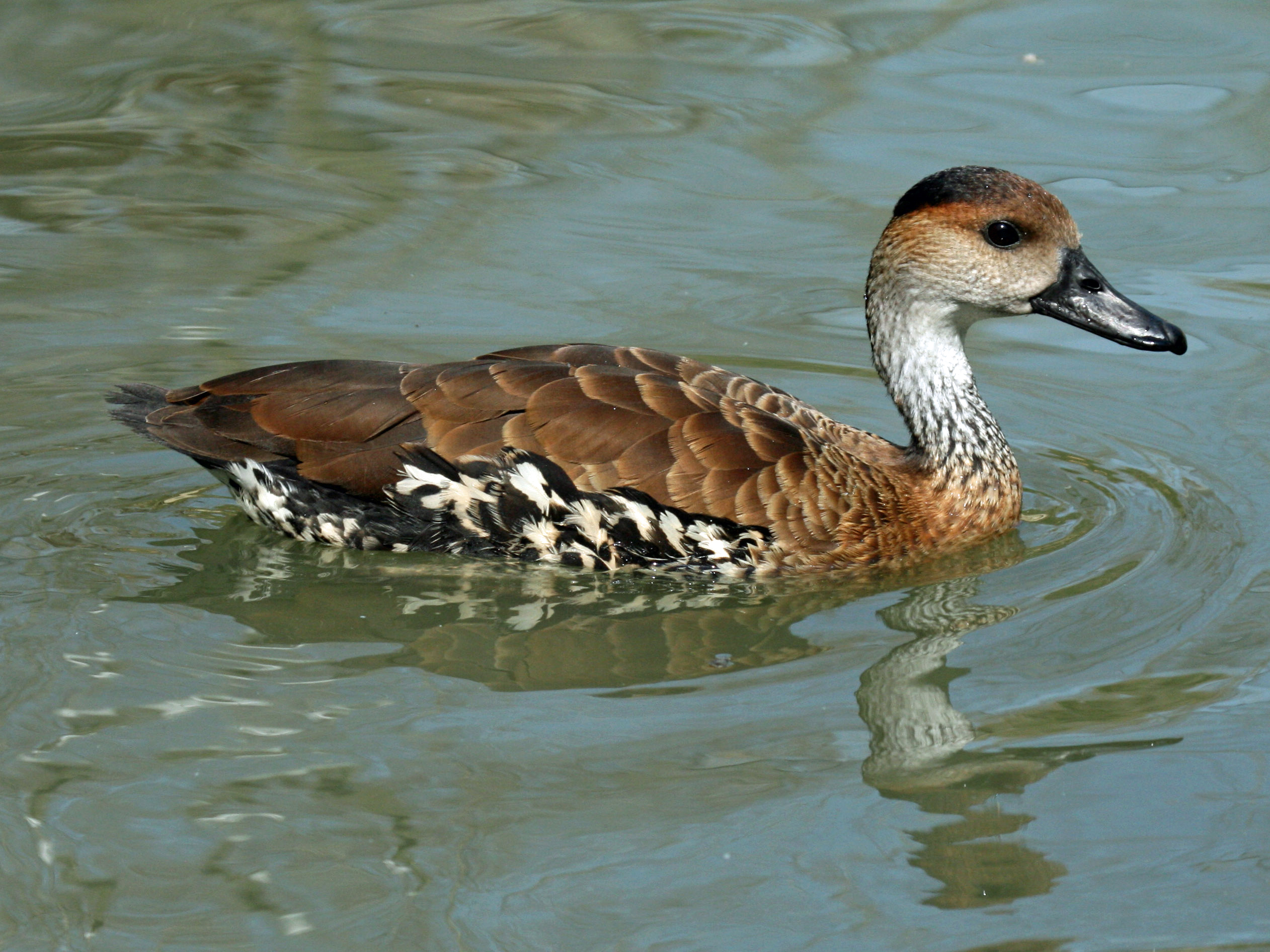
West Indian whistling ducks breed in the IBA

The Fish Ponds and Crossing Place Trail Important Bird Area is a 1024 ha tract of land on the island of Middle Caicos in the Turks and Caicos Islands, a British Overseas Territory in the Lucayan Archipelago of the western Atlantic Ocean. It forms one of the territory's Important Bird Areas (IBAs).

== Description ==
The IBA lies along the western part of the north coast of Middle Caicos. It includes the historical Crossing Bay Trail, which used to connect Middle Caicos to the crossing point to North Caicos, and the Fish Ponds wetlands. It is characterised by limestone cliffs, sea caves, ponds with subterranean connections to the sea, and small, offshore cays. Indian Cave is a dry, inland cave within the site.

=== Birds ===
The IBA was identified as such by BirdLife International because it supports a small breeding colony of West Indian whistling ducks as well as populations of American flamingos, white-tailed tropicbirds, laughing gulls, gull-billed terns, royal terns, least terns, Bahama woodstars and Bahama mockingbirds.
