= Josephine Connolly =

Turks and Caicos Islander politician and businesswoman

The Honourable Josephine Connolly MHA

Minister of Tourism, Environment, Heritage, Maritime, Gaming and Disaster Management
- In office 22 February 2021 – 7 February 2025
- Premier: Washington Misick
- Governor: Dileeni Daniel-Selvaratnam; Nigel Dakin
- Succeeded by: Zhavargo Jolly

Deputy Speaker of the House of Assembly
- In office 22 November 2012 – 20 December 2016
- Premier: Rufus Ewing

Minister Of Education, Youth, Sports and Library Services
- In office 20 December 2016 – 20 June 2017
- Preceded by: Akierra Missick
- Succeeded by: Karen Malcolm

3rd Member of Parliament for All Island District
- Incumbent
- Assumed office 19 February 2021 Serving with Washington Misick; E. Jay Saunders; Jamell Rayan Robinson; Shaun David Malcolm
- Preceded by: Derek Hugh Taylor

2nd Member of Parliament for All Island District
- In office 15 December 2016 – 29 January 2021
- Preceded by: Rufus Ewing

5th Member of Parliament for All Island District
- In office 13 November 2012 – 21 November 2016
- Preceded by: New Office

Personal details
- Born: Josephine Olivia Smith; August 22, 1959 (age 66)
- Party: Progressive National Party (since 2018)
- Other political affiliations: PNP (before 2012) PDM (2012-2018)
- Spouse: Joseph Connolly

Josephine Olivia Connolly MHA is a businesswoman and an elected member of the Turks and Caicos Islands House of Assembly. In February 2025 she won her all island seat for the fourth time.

== Early life ==
Connolly was born in Turks & Caicos on the island of Salt Cay in 1959. She is the daughter of Alexander "Shorty" Smith, the elected representative of Salt Cay and one of the founders of the PNO which later became the PNP.

== Career ==
In 1998, Connolly was a partner in the real estate consulting firm Connolly-Zahm Properties.

In 2010, Connolly was awarded a master's degree from the University of Central Lancashire. In 2010, Connolly was the reigning "Mrs. Turks and Caicos", representing her country in the Mrs. World Pageant.

In July 2012, Connolly became an at-large candidate in the upcoming general election. On 9 November, she was voted in as one of the five at-large members of the parliament. At the first sitting of the house on 28 November, Connolly was unanimously voted in as Deputy Speaker.

In 2013, the Attorney General began an investigation, alleging that Connolly had failed to declare contracts with the Turks and Caicos Islands Government on her declaration of candidacy.

The investigation against Connolly and her political colleagues was subsequently dropped. In the December 2016 election, Connolly retained her seat as an all island member and became part of the new PDM government as Minister of Education, Youth, Sports and Library Services.

In January 2019 Connolly crossed the floor of the House of the Assembly and joined the PNP.

In the February 2021 general election she was voted in as an all Island candidate with PNP, who won a resounding 14–1 victory. Connolly was subsequently appointed as Minister of Tourism, Agriculture, Fisheries, Heritage & the Environment in the new government.
