= Graceway Sports Complex =

Sports venue in Providenciales, Turks and Caicos Islands

Coordinates: 21°46′26.4975″N 72°12′41.9551″W

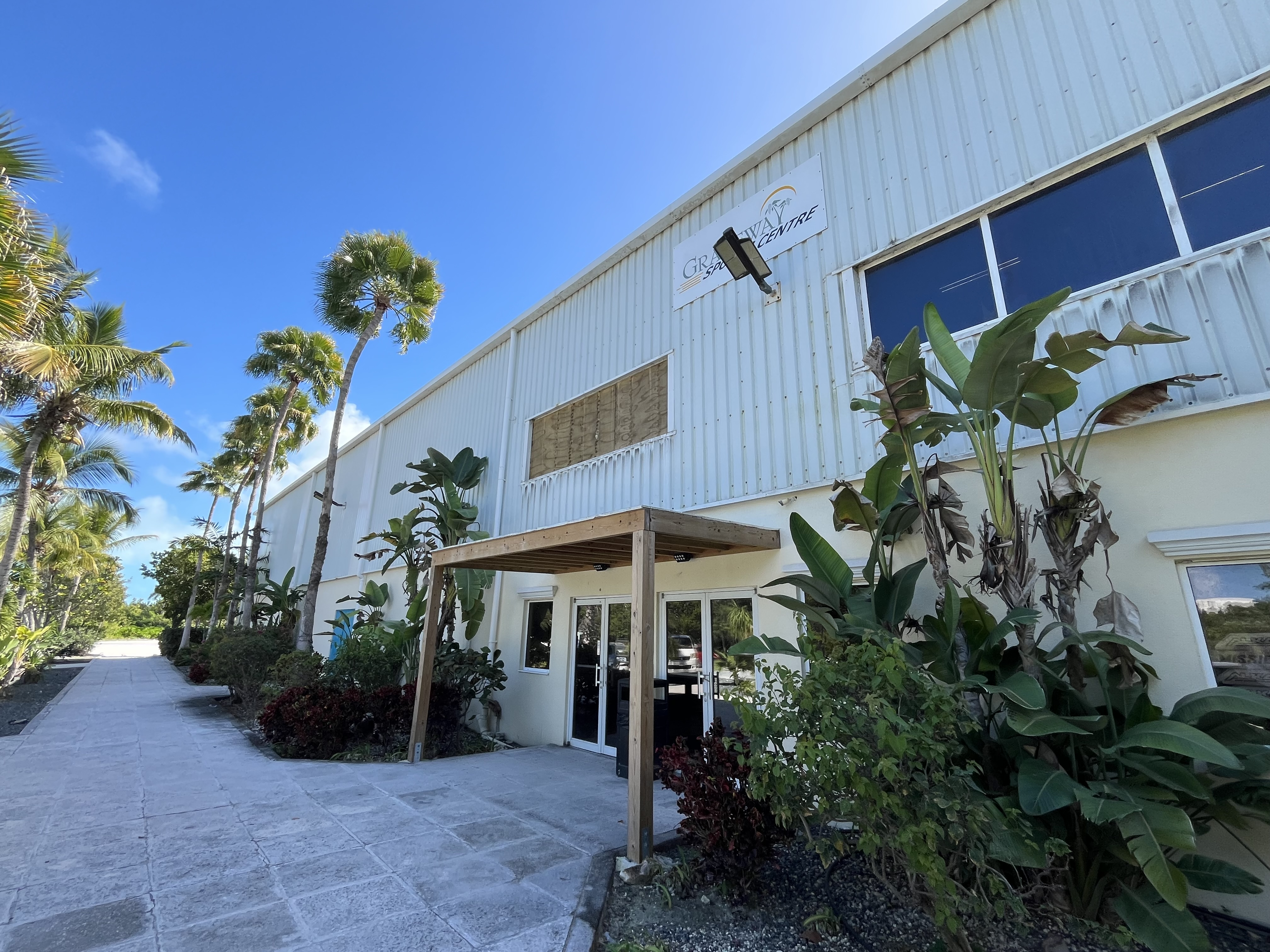
- Interactive map of Graceway Sports Complex
- Location: Providenciales, Turks and Caicos Islands

Graceway Sports Complex is a multi-use sporting facilities in Providenciales, Turks and Caicos Islands. It is currently used for indoor and outdoor activities including athletics, soccer, basketball, volleyball, tennis, squash, hockey and martial arts. Also rugby union matches played at Astroturf Football Field.
