= Cynthia Astwood =

Governor of the Turks and Caicos Islands (born 1946)

Cynthia Anita Louise Astwood OBE (born 9 October 1946) served as the acting Governor of the Turks and Caicos from 26 November until 16 December 2002, when she retired and was succeeded by Jim Poston. She was the first woman to act as Governor of the Turks and Caicos.

Government offices
Preceded by Mervyn Jones	Acting Governor of the Turks and Caicos Islands; 2002	Succeeded by Jim Poston
