= John Kelly (diplomat) =

British diplomat (born 1941)

John Kelly CMG LVO MBE

7th Governor of the Turks and Caicos Islands
- In office 1996–2000
- Preceded by: Martin Bourke
- Succeeded by: Mervyn Jones

Personal details
- Born: John Philip Kelly; 25 June 1941 (age 84) Tuam, County Galway, Ireland

John Philip Kelly, CMG, LVO, MBE (born 25 June 1941) is an Irish-born British diplomat who was Governor of the British overseas territory of the Turks and Caicos Islands from October 1996 to January 2000.

Kelly was born in Tuam, County Galway and emigrated to England in 1958. He joined Her Majesty's Diplomatic Service in 1959, and served at various British embassies and high commissions, and at the Foreign and Commonwealth Office in London.

Kelly was appointed a Member of the Order of the British Empire (MBE) in 1984. In 1989, he became Deputy Governor of Bermuda and was made a Lieutenant in the Royal Victorian Order (LVO) when Queen Elizabeth II visited the island in 1994. He retired from the FCO in 2000, and was awarded the CMG (Companion of the Order of St Michael and St George) in the Queen's Birthday honours that year.

Government offices
Preceded by Martin Bourke	Governor of the Turks and Caicos Islands; 1996–2000	Succeeded by Mervyn Jones
