= Nigel Dakin =

British diplomat and governor (born 1964)

Nigel Dakin CMG
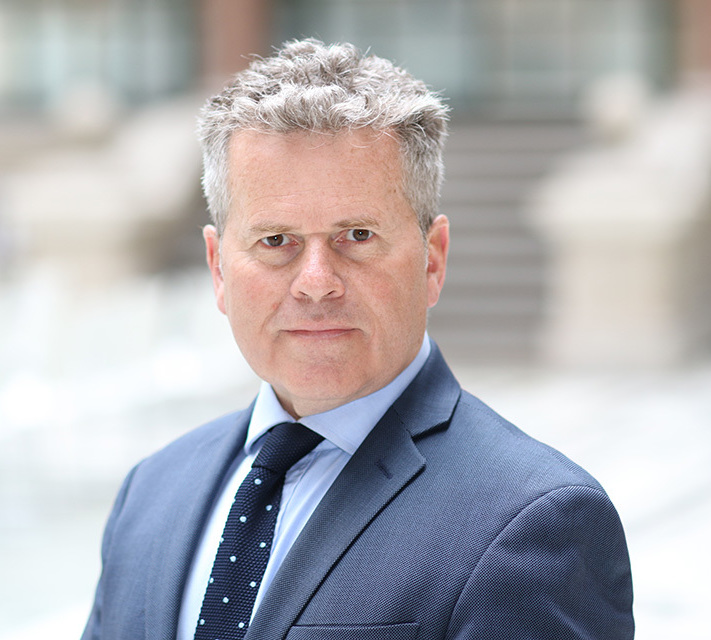

15th Governor of the Turks and Caicos Islands
- In office 15 July 2019 – 29 March 2023
- Monarchs: Elizabeth II; Charles III
- Premier: Sharlene Cartwright-Robinson; Washington Misick
- Deputy: Anya Williams
- Preceded by: John Freeman
- Succeeded by: Anya Williams (acting); Dileeni Daniel-Selvaratnam

Personal details
- Born: 28 February 1964 (age 62) United Kingdom
- Spouse: Amanda Dakin
- Education: University of Birmingham (BA); Kingston University (MBA)

Nigel John Dakin CMG (born 28 February 1964 is a British diplomat and soldier who served as Governor of the Turks and Caicos Islands between 15 July 2019 and 29 March 2023.

== Early life and education ==
Dakin was born on 28 February 1964 in Birmingham, England and is the son of John Frederick Dakin and Dorothy Alice Dakin (née Scott). He grew up in Bournville and was educated at the King Edward VI Five Ways School, a state grammar school in Birmingham, England.

Having secured, while at school, an Army Scholarship, Dakin entered the Royal Military Academy Sandhurst in 1982 and was commissioned into the British Army in 1983. Following service as an Infantry Platoon Commander in Northern Ireland he studied, again on a military scholarship, at the University of Birmingham between 1984 and 1987, where he received a Bachelor of Arts in Political Science. He would later receive a Masters in Business Administration from Kingston University in 1995.

== Career ==
Following university, Dakin returned to the Army, serving in West Germany and Northern Ireland. In 1993 he was mentioned in dispatches for gallantry while serving with the Intelligence Corps in Northern Ireland and between 1994 and 1996 served as a Staff Officer in the Ministry of Defence advising the Defence Secretary (Michael Portillo) and Chief of the Defence Staff (Field Marshal Peter Inge) on matters relating to the Irish Peace Process.

In 1996, Dakin accepted a position within the Foreign and Commonwealth Office (FCO). He first lead staff groups involved in Russia and later on Counter Terrorism and, promoted to Director, he served on the executive board where he oversaw organisational transformation. Concurrently, he was invited by the then Chief of the General Staff, General Sir Nick Carter, to serve as the civilian Non-Executive Director on both the Army No. 1 Board and the Army Higher Honours Committee, a position he retained until 2019.

While overseas Dakin served as First Secretary (Political) in Nigeria (1998–99) and India (1999–2001) and then as the Political Counsellor in Pakistan (2007–2010) and Afghanistan (2012–2013). He served twice in the British Embassy in Washington DC: first from 2005 to 2007 working with the US Administration of George W. Bush on Iraq, Afghanistan and Counter Terrorism and again between 2016 and 2019 as the Senior National Security Official to the UK Ambassador to the United States.

=== Governor of the Turks and Caicos ===
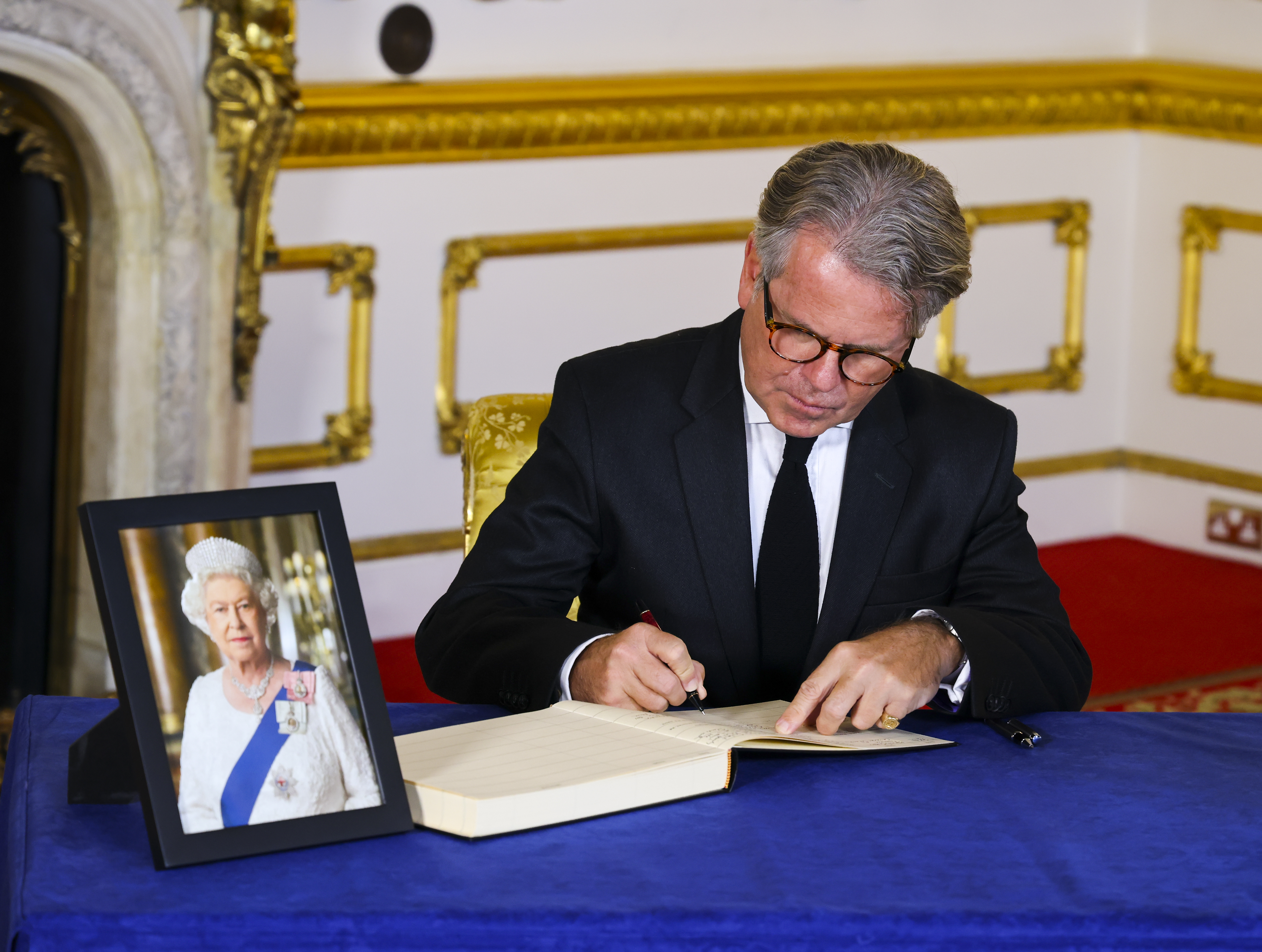
Dakin signing the book of condolence for Queen Elizabeth II at Lancaster House on 17 September 2022

In May 2019, the Foreign and Commonwealth Office announced that Dakin would succeed outgoing Governor John Freeman as Governor of the Turks and Caicos Islands. As such, Dakin was the representative of Queen Elizabeth II and acted as the de facto Head of State responsible for appointing the Head of Government, and senior political positions in the territory. Dakin was also responsible for chairing Cabinet and ensuring the good governance of the territory. The Constitution also reserved to the Governor responsibility for defence, external affairs, the regulation of international financial services and internal security, including the police force.

Dakin's Governorship included: the COVID-19 pandemic, when he held emergency powers; the challenges of mass irregular migration caused by a serious deterioration in the security situation in neighbouring Haiti; a concurrent rise in gang related murder temporarily suppressed following the deployment of armed officers requested from The Bahamas and a package of UK support; an election and resulting change of government during the pandemic; a Royal Visit and the impact of Hurricane Fiona.

Dakin commissioned and oversaw the development of the Turks and Caicos Islands Regiment; the establishment of a National Security Secretariat and accompanying Strategy and the deepening of relationships with the USA and The Bahamas to deliver the inaugural North Caribbean Security Summit and the resulting uplift in regional security co-operation. The decision to combine Immigration and Customs Officers to form a new Border Force was taken. With UK support, the Royal Turks and Caicos Islands Police Force established a 'Guns, Gangs and Drugs' Team to tackle serious organised crime and legislation was passed to provide the Police with a technical intelligence collection capability.

As the Monarch's representative, Dakin proclaimed the accession, in Grand Turk, of His Majesty King Charles III, and attended the funeral of Queen Elizabeth II He left post on 29 March 2023.

== Honours ==
Dakin was appointed Companion of the Order of St Michael and St George (CMG) in the 2020 Birthday Honours for services to British foreign policy.

== Personal life ==
He married Amanda Dakin (née Johnson) in 1987, in her home country of Barbados. They have two children; Charlotte (known as Charlie) and Fraser.

In December 2021, Amanda Dakin was the first woman, and part of the first team including their son Fraser Dakin, to circumnavigate the entirety of the Turks and Caicos Islands using only personal physical power. Over 13 days, either walking, rowing, kayaking, swimming or wading, they traversed 24 Islands and remote Cays, covering 225 miles, including the deep ocean of the Turks Islands Passage. The feat was repeated in October 2022 when Amanda Dakin led a different team. Through the charity Footsteps 4 Good, $80,000 was raised for 20 charities.
