= Alexander Graham Mitchell =

Governor of Turks and Caicos Islands (1923–2010)

- Born: 2 November 1923
- Died: 18 July 2010 (aged 86); Corbridge, Northumberland, England

Alexander Graham Mitchell CBE (2 November 1923 – 18 July 2010) was the first Governor of the Turks and Caicos from April 1973 to May 1975. He had previously served as the last Administrator of the islands from 1971 to 1973. He went on to serve as Bursar of Dame Allan's Schools. He was appointed CBE in the 1973 Birthday Honours.

Mitchell died in Corbridge, Northumberland, England in July 2010 at the age of 86.

| Preceded by Robert Everard Wainwright | Administrator of the Turks and Caicos; 1971–1973 | Succeeded by Position Abolished |
| Preceded by New Position | Governor of the Turks and Caicos Islands; 1973 – 1975 | Succeeded by Arthur Christopher Watson |
