= Constitution of the Turks and Caicos Islands =

The Constitution of the Turks and Caicos Islands, in its present form, was passed in 2011.

== 1962 ==
When Jamaica became independent in 1962, the Turks and Caicos Islands, formerly under Jamaican administration, became a Crown colony in its own right. To this end, an Order in Council was made giving the Turks and Caicos Islands its own constitution appropriate to that status. This was done under the provisions of the West Indies Act 1962. However, as Secretary of State for the Colonies Anthony Greenwood later stated, due to an error the Order (as well as a similar order for the Cayman Islands) was not laid before both Houses of Parliament as required. He stated this did not prevent the orders from coming into effect in 1962, but thought it prudent that they be laid before Parliament as required. The Constitution was then amended twice in 1967 and once each in 1968 and 1969.

== 1976 ==
A new constitution was passed in 1976. 30 August, the date of its passage, is celebrated as a public holiday, Constitution Day. This constitution was suspended in 1986 in response to allegations of malpractice and criminality among both the Government and the Opposition.

== 1988 ==
A new constitution was passed in 1988. It was first amended in 1993, and again in 2002. The September 2002 report of the Constitutional Modernisation Review Body which led to those latest amendments is available online.

== 2006 ==
A new constitution was passed in 2006. It was criticised for giving too much discretion to Cabinet Ministers. The constitution was suspended again in August 2009 when the United Kingdom resumed direct rule over the island in response to allegations of government corruption.

== 2011 ==
The current constitution was passed in 2011. It makes various changes to the 2006 constitution, such as vesting the Attorney-General's powers over criminal prosecutions in a new Director of Public Prosecutions. It came into force on 15 October 2012.
