= Claire Loftus =

Irish Director of Public Prosecutions between 2011 and 2021

Director of Public Prosecutions
- In office 7 November 2011 – 7 November 2021
- Appointed by: Government of Ireland
- Preceded by: James Hamilton
- Succeeded by: Catherine Pierse

Personal details
- Born: 1967 (age 58–59)
- Education: University College Dublin; Law Society of Ireland; Trinity College Dublin

Claire Loftus (born 1967) is an Irish solicitor and civil servant who served as Director of Public Prosecutions from 2011 to 2021.

== Early life ==
Loftus was born in 1967 and is from South Dublin. Her father Dermot was a solicitor. She completed her Leaving Certificate in 1984 and was educated at University College Dublin, where she studied history and politics. She graduated with a BA in 1987 and later obtained a higher diploma in European law. She studied for a year at Rathmines College and received a master's degree in Public Sector Management from Trinity College Dublin in 2002.

== Legal career ==
She undertook an apprenticeship at a family law practice, Marcus A Lynch and Son, and qualified as a solicitor in 1992.

She began her career as a prosecutor in 1993. Working at the Chief State Solicitor's Office, she served in the District Court section for seven years. She was involved in cases involving health and safety law and money laundering. She was the solicitor to Tribunal of Inquiry into the Blood Transfusion Service Board, which was led by retired Chief Justice of Ireland Thomas Finlay. She was involved in the prosecution of former Taoiseach Charles Haughey in 1998 related to obstruction of the McCracken Tribunal.

Between 2001 and 2009, she was the Chief Prosecution Solicitor at the Office of the Director of Public Prosecutions. She was later in charge of the Directing Division at the DPP from 2009.

She served on the Criminal Law Committee of the Law Society of Ireland from 2002 until being appointed DPP, including a term as the chair.

== Director of Public Prosecutions ==
Loftus was appointed as the Director of Public Prosecutions in November 2011, following the retirement of James Hamilton. She is the first woman and the first solicitor to hold the position. Her term was for ten years.

At the beginning of her term, the agency dealt with budget cuts and prosecutions arising out of the post-2008 Irish banking crisis. A decision of the Supreme Court of Ireland in DPP v JC afforded greater flexibility to the DPP on the exclusion of evidence. Criminal Justice (Victims of Crime) Act 2017 gave greater access to the DPP's procedural process to victims of crime.

In 2018, she called for courts to reform how they conducted criminal trials.

She announced the establishment of a sexual offences unit within the DPP to be created in 2020.

She completed her term in November 2021.
