= James Hamilton (barrister) =

Director of Public Prosecutions
- In office 11 July 1999 – 6 November 2011
- Appointed by: Government of Ireland
- Preceded by: Eamonn Barnes
- Succeeded by: Claire Loftus

Personal details
- Born: 20 March 1949 (age 77) Dublin, Ireland
- Education: Trinity College Dublin King's Inns

James Hamilton (born 20 March 1949) is an Irish barrister and administrator who served as the Director of Public of Prosecutions from 1999 to 2011. In September 2010, Hamilton was elected President of the International Association of Prosecutors, succeeding Francois Falletti.

Hamilton became Director of Public Prosecutions in 1999, succeeding Eamonn Barnes. Before becoming Director of Public Prosecutions, Hamilton was a practising barrister and was head of the office of the Attorney General of Ireland.

In 2018, Hamilton was appointed to chair a review into the anti-Fraud and anti-Corruption Measures in the Department of Justice and Equality, instituted by Tánaiste Frances Fitzgerald.

He was appointed as an independent advisor to the Scottish Government on the ministerial code in 2013 by former Scottish First Minister Alex Salmond and was reappointed by his successor First Minister Nicola Sturgeon in 2015. He was also appointed to the same role by the Welsh Government. In 2017, he concluded that Welsh First Minister Carwyn Jones did not mislead the Welsh Assembly over what he knew about bullying allegations at the top level of government. Hamilton also conducted an investigation into the Alex Salmond scandal, namely whether Sturgeon had breached the Scottish ministerial code during the Scottish Government's investigation into sexual harassment complaints made against Salmond. This was paused in 2019 and resumed in August 2020. On 22 March 2021, his report was published, concluding that Sturgeon did not breach the ministerial code. However, he caveated that "It is for the Scottish parliament to decide whether they were in fact misled." A majority of MSPs on the Committee on the Scottish Government Handling of Harassment Complaints concluded that it was "hard to believe" Sturgeon when she told Parliament she had not known about concerns of inappropriate behaviour Mr Salmond before November 2017. It also determined that Sturgeon gave an "inaccurate account" of what happened when she met Mr Salmond at her home on 2 April 2018 and had misled the committee.
