= Michael J. Bradley (colonial administrator) =

Michael John Bradley, CMG, QC (11 June 1933 – 22 February 2010) was Governor of the Turks and Caicos from January 1987 to June 1993. Bradley was succeeded by Martin Bourke in June 1993.

He was born in Belfast. He studied law at the University of London, Trinity College Dublin and Queen's University, Belfast, and practised as a solicitor before entering the colonial service. He was Attorney General of the British Virgin Islands from 1977 to 1978, of the Turks and Caicos in 1980, of Montserrat in 1981, and of the Cayman Islands in 1982. In 1986 he was appointed Governor of the Turks and Caicos, a post he kept until his retirement from the colonial service at the age of 60.

Bradley was appointed Queen's Counsel in 1982, and Companion of the Order of St Michael and St George in 1990.

His wife, Patricia (née Macauley), is an ornithologist.

Preceded by Christopher J. Turner	Governor of the Turks and Caicos Islands; 1987–1993	Succeeded by Martin Bourke
