= Catherine Pierse =

Irish Director of Public Prosecutions since 2021

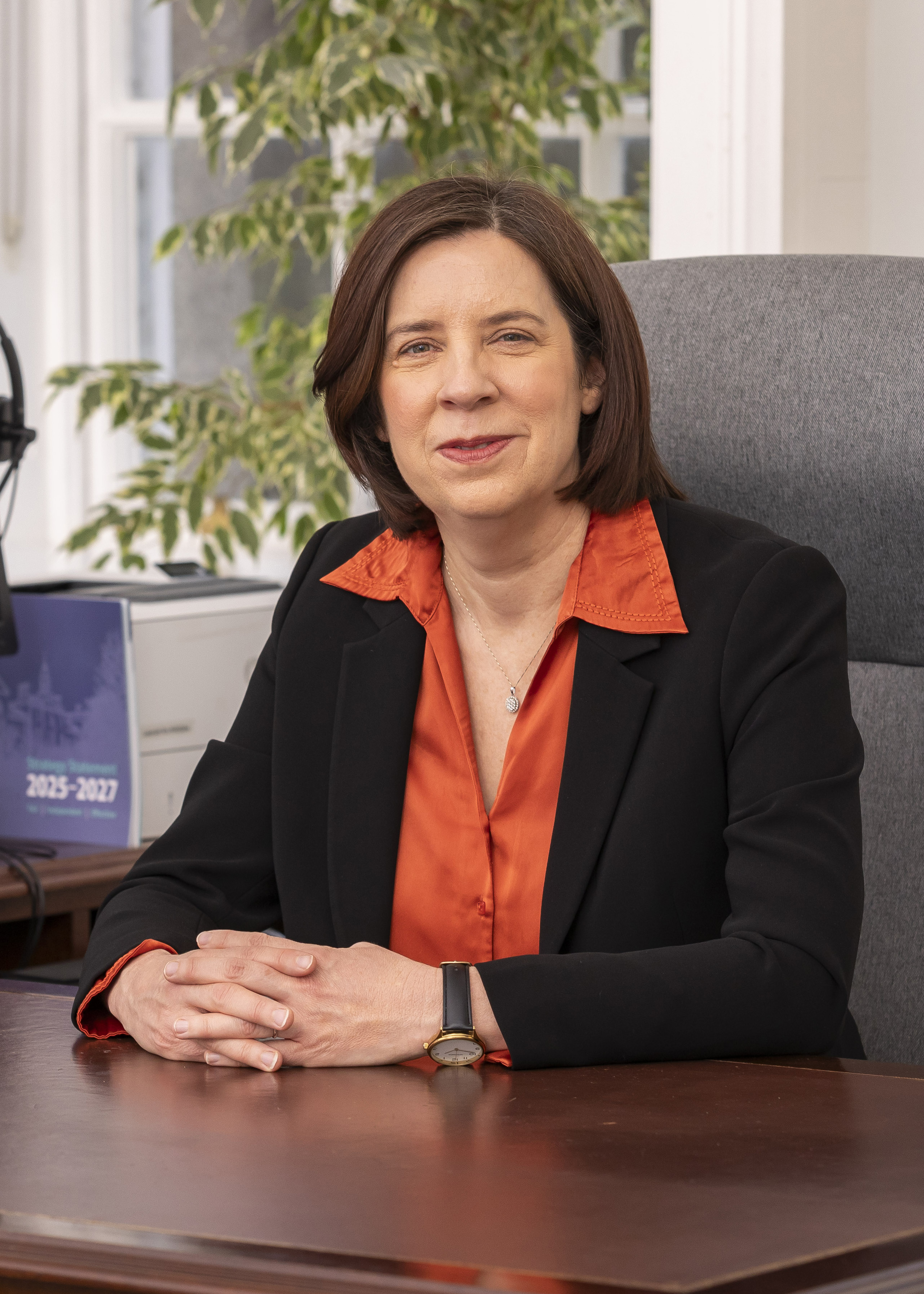
- Pierse in 2025

Director of Public Prosecutions
- Incumbent
- Assumed office 8 November 2021
- Appointed by: Government of Ireland
- Preceded by: Claire Loftus

Personal details
- Education: University College Cork; Law Society of Ireland; Queen's University Belfast

Catherine Pierse is an Irish solicitor who has been the Director of Public Prosecutions since November 2021.

== Early life ==
Pierse comes from Listowel, County Kerry. She studied at University College Cork. She obtained a master's degree in governance from the Queen's University Belfast in 2011.

== Legal career ==
She qualified as a solicitor in 2001. She first worked as criminal defence solicitor, including as a trial lawyer at Kelleher and O'Doherty solicitors. She later worked as a legal adviser to the Garda Síochána Ombudsman Commission and was a lawyer at the Central Bank of Ireland.

She was the head of legal, policy and research at the Policing Authority between 2016 and 2018.

Her final position before becoming Director of Public Prosecutions was head of the agency's prosecution support services division.

== Director of Public Prosecutions ==
Pierse was announced as the successor to Claire Loftus as the Director of Public Prosecutions in October 2021. Her appointment was effective from 8 November 2021.
