= Mervyn Jones =

British diplomat

Mervyn Thomas Jones (born 23 November 1942) is a British diplomat who was Governor of the Turks and Caicos Islands from January 2000 to November 2002. Jones was succeeded by acting Governor Cynthia Astwood on 26 November 2002. Before taking up this posting, Jones spent several years at the British embassy in Brussels, where he concentrated on trade promotion, before being promoted to Deputy Head of Mission (de facto deputy ambassador).

Government offices
Preceded by John Kelly	Governor of the Turks and Caicos Islands; 2000–2002	Succeeded by Cynthia Astwood; Acting Governor
