= Wheeland =

- Town
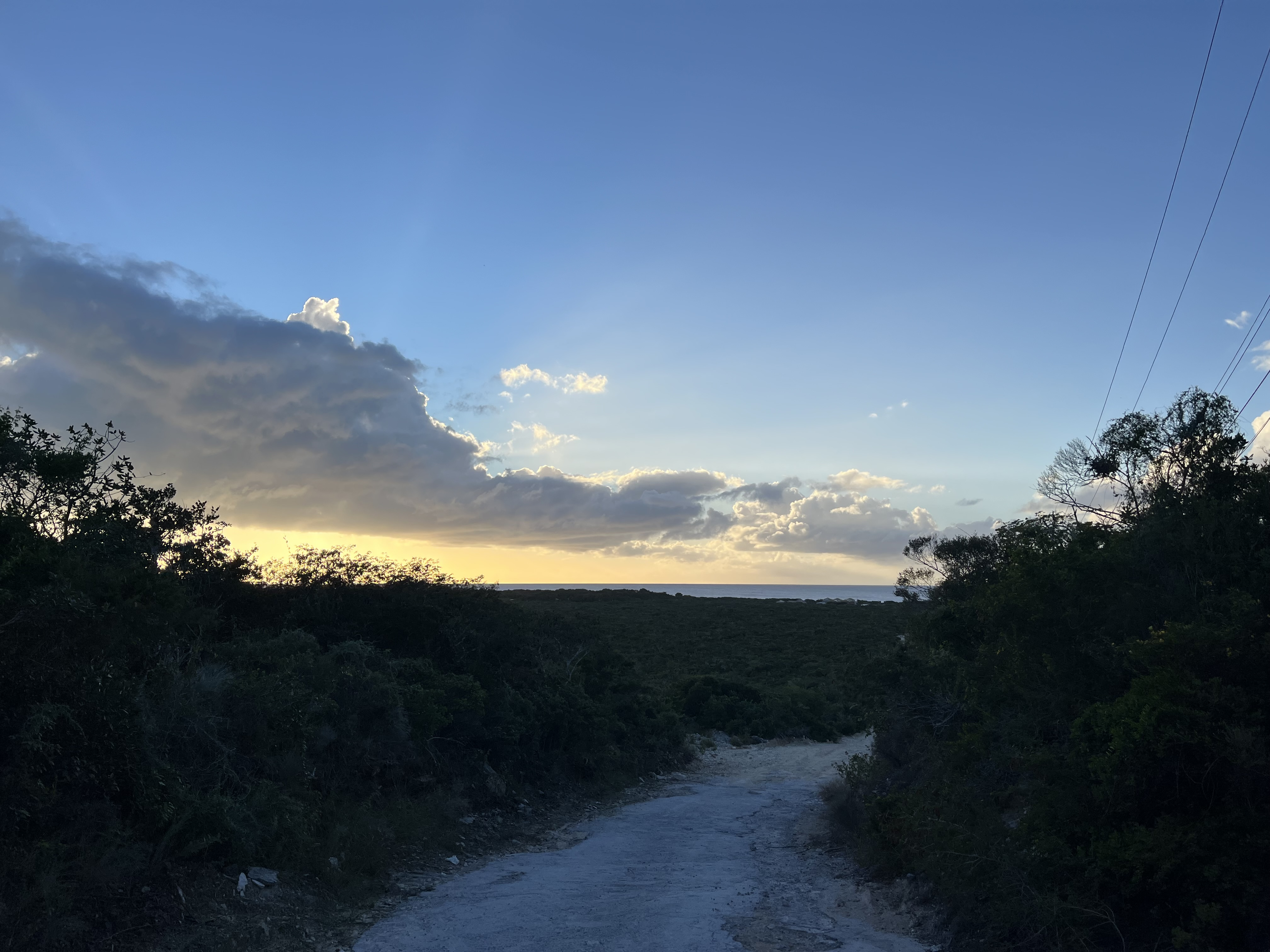

- Location within Turks and Caicos Islands
- Coordinates: 21°50′56″N 72°19′12″W
- Country: United Kingdom
- Overseas territory: Turks and Caicos Islands
- District: Providenciales

Population (2012)
  - Total: 3,210
- Climate: BSh

Wheeland is a town on Providenciales, Turks and Caicos Islands. As of 2012 it had a population of 3,210.

Wheeland is located between Blue Hills and Northwest Point. There are two residential neighborhoods in the area: Millennium Heights and Wheeland Settlement. The Wheeland Pond is the site of a former sand quarry. Traditionally the main industries in Wheeland were lumber harvesting and ship salvaging.
