= Jim Poston =

British diplomat (1945–2007)

James Poston, CBE (19 June 1945 – 13 October 2007) was a British diplomat who was Governor of the Turks and Caicos Islands from 2002 to 2005. Poston succeeded acting Governor Cynthia Astwood on 16 December 2002.

Poston was born in 1945 in St Albans, a city in southern Hertfordshire, England. He was the son of an Anglican priest and a social worker. He was educated at the Perse School in Cambridge before going on to attend Exeter University, where he studied French and history. After graduating in 1970, he joined the Foreign Office.

Poston served as the British consul general to New England from 1995 until 1999. While there, he arranged for the then Unionist leader David Trimble to visit and meet local Irish-Americans. He also served the Foreign Office in Brussels, Israel, Nigeria, and South Africa.

Poston had a wife, Romey, with whom he had two daughters, Izzy and Kate, and a son, James. He died on 13 October 2007 at the age of 62.

Government offices
Preceded by Cynthia Astwood; Acting Governor	Governor of the Turks and Caicos Islands; 2002–2005	Succeeded by Richard Tauwhare
