= Robert Everard Wainwright =

Administrator of the Turks and Caicos Islands

Robert Everard Wainwright CMG (24 June 1913 – 29 November 1990) was the Administrator of the Turks and Caicos in 1965 and from 1967 to 1971. Wainwright was preceded by John Anthony Golding in 1965 and succeeded by Alexander Graham Mitchell in 1971.

Born in 1913 in Winchester, he graduated with a BA from Cambridge (Marlborough and Trinity) in 1933 or 1934 Wainwright joined with the Colonial Service in Kenya Colony (rejecting an offer in the Sudan) as a cadet in 1935 and retired as Chief Commissioner in 1963 due to Kenyan independence. His retirement was brief as he was appointed as Administrator in the Turks and Caicos in 1965. Wainwright was fluent in Swahili.

== Personal life ==
Wainwright married Bridget Doris Alan-Williams in 1939 (b. 7 Aug 1918 Harwich, d. 31 Dec 2000 Dorset). Wainwright died on 29 November 1990, survived by his wife, and son Christopher James (1943).
