= Martin Bourke (diplomat) =

British diplomat

Martin Bourke (born 12 March 1947) is a former British diplomat who was Governor of the Turks and Caicos Islands from June 1993 to September 1996. Bourke was succeeded by John Kelly in October 1996.

He was educated at Stockport Grammar School and at the University of London.

Bourke's governorship of the Turks and Caicos Islands was controversial after he made comments regarding drug trafficking on the islands and corruption in the police force.

Government offices
Preceded by Michael J. Bradley	Governor of the Turks and Caicos Islands; 1993–1996	Succeeded by John Kelly
