= Richard Tauwhare =

British diplomat (born 1959)

- Born: 1 November 1959 (age 66); Woking, Surrey, England
- Education: Abingdon School
- Alma mater: University of Cambridge, England
- Children: 3

Richard Tauwhare (/təˈfɑːri/; born 1 November 1959) was the tenth Governor of the Turks and Caicos Islands, serving from 11 July 2005 to 16 July 2008. He succeeded Governor Jim Poston.

Originally from Woking, United Kingdom, Mr Tauwhare has held several government posts around the world. Educationally, he attended Abingdon School and obtained an MA in History from Cambridge University. He can speak the Swahili language.

Mr Tauwhare is married and has three children.

== See also ==
- List of Old Abingdonians

Government offices
| Preceded by Jim Poston | Governor of the Turks and Caicos Islands; 2005–2008 | Succeeded by Gordon Wetherell |
