= Rhondalee Braithwaite-Knowles =

Turks and Caicos attorney

The Honourable Rhondalee Braithwaite-Knowles OBE, KC

Attorney General of the Turks and Caicos Islands
- Incumbent
- Assumed office 6 March 2014
- Monarch: Charles III
- Governor: Dileeni Daniel-Selvaratnam
- Deputy: Khalilah Astwood
- Preceded by: Huw Shepheard

Personal details
- Born: Rhondalee Moreen Braithwaite Grand Turk Island, Turks and Caicos Islands
- Education: Liberty University; University of the West Indies; Eugene Dupuch Law School
- Occupation: Teacher, attorney

Rhondalee Braithwaite-Knowles, OBE, is an attorney from the Turks and Caicos Islands and the first native-born Turks and Caicos Islander to serve as the territory's Attorney General.

== Early life ==
Rhondalee Moreen Braithwaite was born on Grand Turk Island to Susan (née Fulford) and Frederick Braithwaite, as their second child among six siblings. Her father was a Barbadian, who had immigrated to the Turks and Caicos and worked as a policeman. Her mother was from South Caicos and was employed as the Registrar of Lands.

From an early age, Braithwaite wanted to study law and completed her secondary education at the Turks and Caicos High School.

== Teaching career ==
For two years after finishing high school, Braithwaite taught second grade at the Grand Turk Christian Academy, before deciding to further her education. She went on to study at Liberty University in Lynchburg, Virginia, earning a degree in government and history and then returned to Grand Turk to teach forth grade for an additional two years.

== Legal career ==
=== Education and training ===
Deciding she did not want to be a teacher, she continued her studies, enrolling in law school at the University of the West Indies (UWI), Cave Hill Campus. Braithwaite earned her Bachelor of Laws at UWI before pursuing a certificate for legal education from the Eugene Dupuch Law School in Nassau.

=== Crown counsel ===
In 2000, Braithwaite-Knowles returned to the Turks and Caicos and began working for the government as a Crown Counsel. Within four years, she was appointed as a Senior Crown Counsel and by 2006, she had been promoted as Principal Crown Counsel with a responsibility for commercial transactions, overseeing development documents, leases, licenses, and other business agreements.

=== Attorney-General ===
Braithwaite-Knowles became Deputy Attorney-General in 2008 and, in 2013, she was made an officer of the Order of the British Empire (OBE) for her contributions to public service reform.

After Huw Shepheard stepped down as Attorney-General in 2013, Braithwaite-Knowles applied for the position. After a recruitment process that included numerous overseas candidates, Braithwaite-Knowles was selected as the first native born Attorney-General of the Turks and Caicos, simultaneously becoming the first woman and youngest person to hold the job.

== Personal life ==
Braithwaite is married to husband, Gary Knowles, and the couple have one son.
