= Deputy Governor of the Turks and Caicos Islands =

Deputy Governor of Turks and Caicos Islands
- Coat of Arms of the Turks and Caicos Islands

- Flag of the Turks and Caicos Islands
- Incumbent; Anya Williams since 15 October 2012
- Government of the Turks and Caicos Islands
- Style: Her Excellency
- Status: Head of Civil Service
- Member of: Cabinet
- Reports to: Governor
- Term length: At His Majesty's pleasure
- Inaugural holder: Mahala Wynns
- Website: https://gov.tc/deputy-governor

The Deputy Governor of the Turks and Caicos Islands is a gubernatorial official who acts as Governor under a dormant commission when the latter is absent from the territory.

The Deputy Governor must be a resident of the Turks and Caicos Islands. They are appointed by the Governor in pursuance of instructions formally given by the monarch through the Foreign Secretary. The Deputy Governor holds office during His Majesty's pleasure.

== Responsibilities ==
In addition to acting in place of the Governor when needed, the Deputy Governor has a wide portfolio of other responsibilities within the Government of the Turks and Caicos Islands. As of 2022, this extends to:

- Heading the public service
- Being the line manager of the Permanent Secretaries
- Chairing a Permanent Secretaries’ committee that reviews legislation and decisions for Cabinet.

In addition, the Deputy Governor’s office has direct responsibility for:

- The Human Resources Management Division of the Government
- Democratic Services
  - House of Assembly
  - Directorate Services
- Contracts & Corporate Performance Management
- The government’s Press Office

== Office-holders ==
Name	Period
Mahala Wynns	2006–2013
Anya Williams	2013–present
