= Gordon Wetherell =

British diplomat (born 1948)

Gordon Wetherell CMG
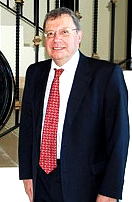
- Gordon Wetherell in 2010

Governor of the Turks and Caicos Islands
- In office 5 August 2008 – 21 August 2011
- Preceded by: Richard Tauwhare
- Succeeded by: Ric Todd

Personal details
- Born: 11 November 1948 (age 78) Addis Ababa, Ethiopia
- Education: New College, Oxford; University of Chicago

Gordon Geoffrey Wetherell CMG (born 11 November 1948) is a British diplomat who was the former governor of the Turks and Caicos Islands. He was appointed on 5 August 2008, replacing Richard Tauwhare in the position. On 14 August 2009, he assumed direct political control when the British government imposed direct rule on the islands in response to a Foreign Office inquiry which found "information in abundance pointing to a high probability of systematic corruption or serious dishonesty" in the islands' administration under former premier, Michael Misick.

He was educated at Bradfield College (in Bradfield, Berkshire), at New College, Oxford and at the University of Chicago. His Foreign Office career has included service in East Berlin, Geneva, New Delhi, and Warsaw. From 1997 to 2000 he was the British ambassador to Ethiopia (and concurrently non-resident ambassador to Eritrea and Djibouti). He served as ambassador to Luxembourg from 2000 to 2004, and High Commissioner to Ghana from 2004 to 2007.

He was appointed Companion of the Order of St Michael and St George (CMG) in the 2011 Birthday Honours.

Governor Wetherell's last official meeting in office was with the advisory council on 11 August 2011, in Grand Turk. Wetherell departed the Providenciales, Turks and Caicos, on Sunday, 21 August 2011, ending his term as governor.

Diplomatic posts
Preceded by Robin Christopher	British Ambassador to Ethiopia; 1997–2000	Succeeded by Myles Wickstead
Preceded by William Ehrman	British Ambassador to Luxembourg; 2000–2004	Succeeded by James Clark
Preceded by Roderick Pullen	British High Commissioner to Ghana; 2004–2007	Succeeded by Nicholas Westcott
Government offices
Preceded by Richard Tauwhare	Governor of the Turks and Caicos Islands; 2007–2011	Succeeded by Ric Todd
