= Anya Williams =

Turks and Caicos Islander politician

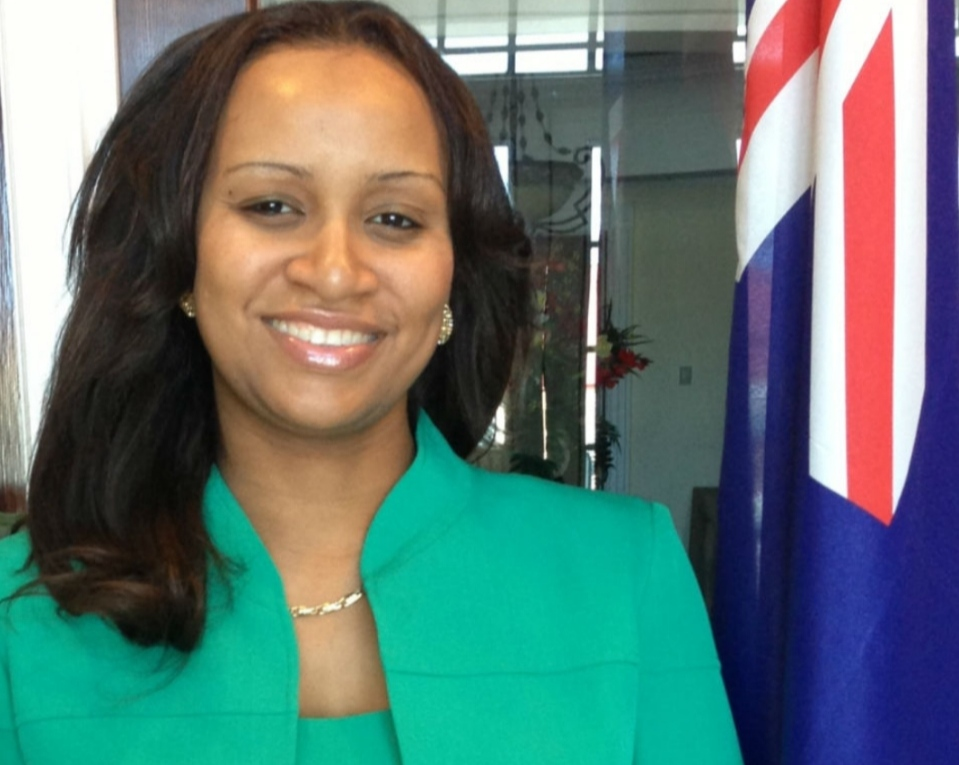

Deputy Governor of the Turks and Caicos Islands
- Incumbent
- Assumed office 15 October 2012
- Governor: Nigel Dakin; John Freeman; Peter Beckingham; Ric Todd
- Preceded by: Mahala Wynns

Acting Governor of the Turks and Caicos Islands
- In office 29 March 2023 – 29 June 2023
- In office 10 October 2016 – 17 October 2016
- In office 15 September 2013 – 9 October 2013

Personal details
- Born: 8 October 1980 (age 45) Grand Turk Island, Turks and Caicos Islands
- Education: Florida International University (MS)

Anya Williams (born 8 October 1980) is a Turks and Caicos Islander politician who is currently serving as Deputy Governor of the Turks and Caicos Islands since 15 October 2012.

Williams has a Master of Science in accounting from Florida International University. She has worked as Permanent Secretary in the government's finance office.

Williams was born on Grand Turk Island. Secretary of State for Foreign and Commonwealth Affairs William Hague appointed Williams to her position, effective 15 October 2012.
