= John Anthony Golding =

John Anthony Golding CVO (25 July 1920 – 18 April 2012) was a British colonial administrator who served as Administrator of the Turks and Caicos Islands from 1965 to 1967. He was awarded a Commander of the Royal Victorian Order (CVO) personally by Queen Elizabeth II on her visit to the islands in February 1966. He was educated at Bedford School. He died in April 2012 at the age of 91.
