= Princess Alexandra Hospital, Anguilla =

Hospital on Anguilla

Princess Alexandra Hospital
- Health Authority of Anguilla

Geography
- Location: The Valley, Anguilla
- Coordinates: 18.2203°N 63.04825°W

Services
- Emergency department: Yes
- Beds: 32

Links
- Website: www.haa.ai/page/medical-services

The Princess Alexandra Hospital is a small hospital on Anguilla.

It has a pharmacy, wards and a dialysis section.

It suffered considerable storm damage as a result of Hurricane Irma, losing its roof, equipment and bed space. The British government and charitable donations have contributed towards the rebuilding program. Tim Foy says "The United Kingdom government is committed to the full rehabilitation of the Princess Alexandra Hospital". £4 million from the British Government is earmarked for the hospital.

The rebuilding programme is intended to include a computed tomography scanner and a new maternity wing, increasing the capacity from 4 to 8 patients. The maternity wing was opened in November 2018 by Blondel Cluff CBE, who is the Anguilla government’s representative in the United Kingdom and the chief executive officer of the West India Committee that raised funds for the rebuilding.
