= Blue Hills, Turks and Caicos Islands =

Blue Hills
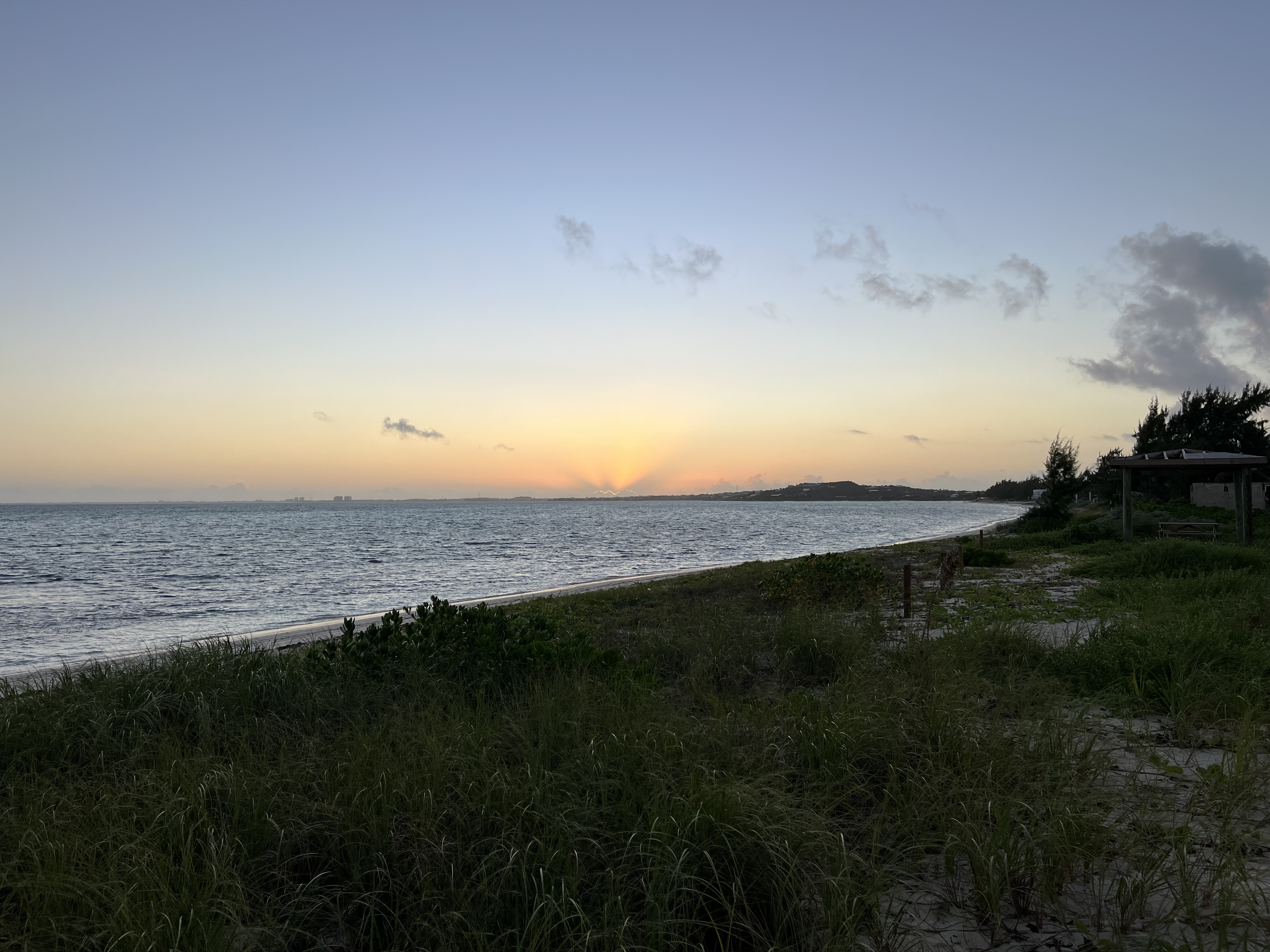

Highest point
- Elevation: 49 m (161 ft)
- Prominence: 49 m (161 ft)
- Coordinates: 21°48′N 72°17′W

Geography
- Location within Turks and Caicos Islands
- Location: Providenciales, Turks and Caicos Islands

Blue Hills are the highest point of Turks and Caicos Islands, a British Overseas Territory located in the Caribbean, with an elevation of 49 metres (161 ft).
