= Attorney-General of the Turks and Caicos Islands =

Legal advisor to the Government of Turks and Caicos Islands

The Attorney-General of the Turks and Caicos Islands is the legal adviser to the Government and House of Assembly of the Turks and Caicos Islands. Previously administered indirectly via Bermuda, Jamaica and the Bahamas, the islands received their own governor and became a separate autonomous British Overseas Territory when Bahamas became independent in 1973.

== Appointment and remuneration ==
The Attorney-General is appointed by the Governor under Section 91 of the 2011 Constitution. Under the 1988 Constitution, appointment and dismissal of the Attorney-General was in the sole discretion of the Governor. The 2006 Constitution added the requirement the Governor must consult with the Premier before appointing the Attorney-General, and may only remove the Attorney-General with the prior approval of the Secretary of State, for inability to discharge the functions of his or her office, or for misbehaviour. The 2011 constitution removed the requirement to consult with the Premier before appointment, but retained the requirement to obtain approval of the Secretary of State for removal. The Turks and Caicos Islands Constitutional and Electoral Reform Project (CER) had initially suggested that the 2011 Constitution provide for the Attorney-General to be appointed by the Premier or the Cabinet (as in other British Overseas Territories and Commonwealth countries) instead of the Governor, but in the end the CER decided to avoid recommending drastic changes to the appointment process, leaving the issue open instead for a potential future constitutional amendment.

Section 125 of the 2011 Constitution newly provides that the remuneration of the Attorney-General should be prescribed by Ordinance, that such remuneration should be paid out of the Consolidated Fund, and that the level of remuneration shall not be altered to the disadvantage of the Attorney-General save through an Ordinance which makes an equivalent reduction to the remuneration of all members of the public service.

== Legal powers ==
=== Current powers ===
The power of the Attorney-General to act as legal adviser to the Government and the House of Assembly arises from Section 41 of the 2011 Constitution. The Attorney-General also has a variety of powers with regards to elections:

- The power, in common with any registered elector and partially in common with members of the House of Assembly, to make an application to the Supreme Court to determine the question of the validity of any member's election to the House of Assembly, or whether such a member has vacated his or her seat;
- The sole power to file suit in the Supreme Court to recover a fine of $1000 per day from any person who sits or votes in the legislature without reasonable belief that he or she is entitled to do so;
- Newly in the 2011 Constitution, the power, in common with any registered elector, to challenge the veracity of a declaration made by a candidate for election to the House of Assembly that the said candidate "is qualified for election under section 46 and that no disqualification mentioned in section 49 applies to him or her".

=== Historical powers ===
The 1988 and 2006 Constitutions gave the Attorney-General broad powers with regards to criminal proceedings. These were, namely, the powers:

- to institute and undertake criminal proceedings against any person before any court in respect of any offence against any law in force in the Islands;
- to take over and continue any such criminal proceedings that have been instituted by any other person or authority; and
- to discontinue at any stage before judgment is delivered any such criminal proceedings instituted or undertaken by himself or herself or any other person or authority.

Exercise of these powers was "not subject to the direction or control of any other person or authority". However, the CER raised the concern about the "many hats" worn by the Attorney-General resulting in confusion over the proper functions of the role, and also pointed out that in other parts of the Commonwealth the functions with regards to criminal proceedings were typically vested in a separate Director of Public Prosecutions. As a result, the 2011 Constitution created the new position of Director of Public Prosecutions of the Turks and Caicos Islands and handed these powers over to that officer.

== Other functions ==
Aside from powers in legal proceedings, the Constitution gives other powers to the Attorney-General as well. The Attorney-General is a member of the Cabinet and one of five unelected members of the House of Assembly. The Attorney-General first became a member of the legislature (then, the Legislative Council) under a 1993 amendment to the 1988 constitution, which was continued under the 2006 Constitution. The CER initially recommended that the Attorney-General should be removed entirely as a member of the House of Assembly, though he or she would retain the right to speak in person or appoint a delegate to speak at Assembly meetings. In the end, the 2011 Constitution continued the Attorney-General's membership in the House of Assembly, but stripped him or her of the right to vote.

When both the Governor and Deputy Governor are absent from the country or unable to perform the functions of their offices, the Attorney-General becomes the Acting Governor. Similarly, when both the Governor and Deputy Governor are absent from a meeting of the Cabinet, the Attorney-General presides over the meeting.

The 2006 Constitution made the Attorney-General a member of the newly established five-member Advisory National Security Council. The 2011 Constitution made the Attorney-General of the newly established four-to-six person Mercy Committee (with which the Governor consults on pardons), and provided that the Mercy Committee may only transact business in the presence of the Attorney-General.

== List of attorneys-general ==
- Michael Jennings (1976-1980) [Ena Joyce St. Clare Collymore-Woodstock, 1977–1978 (acting)]
- Michael Bradley (1980)
- Terence Donegan (1980–1982) (deported, 1987)
- David Geoffrey Lang (1982-1987)
- Ian Stuart Lamb (1987-1991)
- Glen Dale Gatland (1991-1993)
- David Ferguson Ballantyne (1993-1998)
- David John Jeremiah (1998-2004)
- Kurt de Freitas (2004–2010)
- Huw Shepheard (2010–2014)
- Rhondalee Braithwaite-Knowles (2014–present)

== See also ==
- Justice ministry
- Politics of the Turks and Caicos Islands
