= Five Cays =

Settlement in Turks and Caicos Islands, United Kingdom

- Settlement
- Location within Turks and Caicos Islands Location within the Caribbean
- Coordinates: 21.764°N 72.260°W
- Country: United Kingdom
- Overseas territory: Turks and Caicos Islands
- District: Providenciales

Population (2012)
  - Settlement: 3,592
- Climate: BSh

Five Cays is a settlement on the island of Providenciales (known locally as Provo) in the Turks and Caicos Islands, a British Overseas Territory. It is located on the south coast of the island, adjacent to the Providenciales International Airport. Along with The Bight and Blue Hills, Five Cays is one of the three original settlements on Provo.

Five Cays is named for the five small limestone islands (cays) that can be seen offshore from the settlement, guarding Cooper Jack Bay. The five cays include: Middle Cay, Bay Cay, Sim Cay, Pusey Cay, and William Cay.
