= Middle Caicos =

Caribbean island in the Turks and Caicos Islands

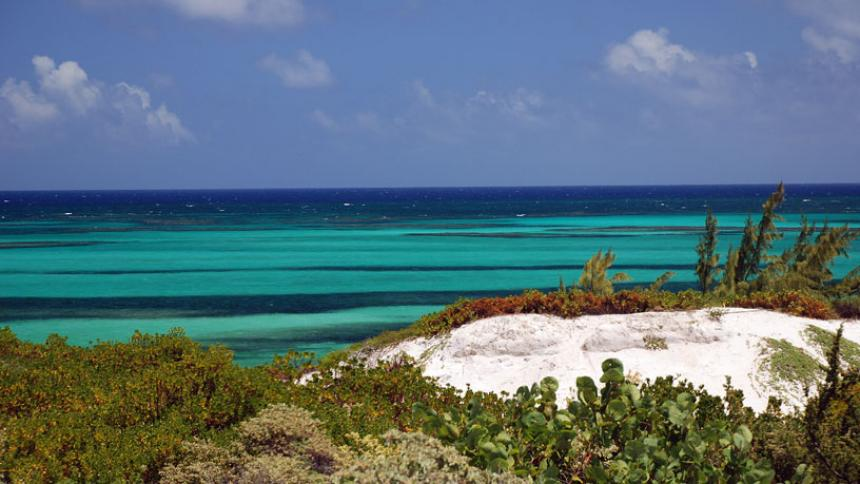
- A view of the Caribbean from Middle Caicos

- Location of Middle Caicos within the Turks and Caicos Islands

- Location within Turks and Caicos Islands Location within the Caribbean

Geography
- Location: Atlantic Ocean
- Coordinates: 21°47′17.49″N 71°44′4.35″W
- Archipelago: Lucayan Archipelago
- Area: 144.2 km^{2} (55.7 sq mi)

Administration
- United Kingdom; Turks and Caicos Islands
- British Overseas Territory: Turks and Caicos Islands

Demographics
- Population: 168 (2012)
- Pop. density: 1.9/km^{2} (4.9/sq mi)

Additional information
- Time zone: EST (UTC-5)
  - Summer (DST): EDT (UTC-4)
- ISO code: TC

Ramsar Wetland
- Official name: North, Middle & East Caicos Islands
- Designated: 27 June 1990
- Reference no.: 493

Middle Caicos is the largest island in the Turks and Caicos Islands. To the west, it is separated from North Caicos by Juniper Hole, and to the east, from East Caicos by Lorimer Creek, both narrow passages that can accommodate only small boats. The island is known for its extensive system of caves and its significant Lucayan Indian archaeological sites. The island is connected to North Caicos via a causeway. Middle Caicos was previously called Grand Caicos, although this name is not used today.

== Geography ==
The island has an area of 144.2 square kilometres (55.7 sq mi) within the high water mark, and of 294.1 square kilometres (113.6 sq mi) within the shoreline. The difference between the two values is not accounted for as land area. It is part of the North Caicos and Middle Caicos District.

Notable natural areas are the scenic Mudjin Harbour, located on the northern shore, and Conch Bar Caves. On the eastern part of the islands are the ruins of Haulover Plantation. There are at least 38 Lucayan sites on Middle Caicos. Recent excavation has revealed that Middle Caicos was likely the principal settlement of Lucayan people in the subtropics. Evidence of Lucayan settlements date back to 750 AD and archaeologists believe that as many as 4,000 Indians once lived on the island.

The Fish Ponds and Crossing Place Trail Important Bird Area lies in the northwestern part of the island.

== Population ==
The resident population of Middle Caicos is estimated to be 118 in 2022.

== Middle Caicos Settlements ==
=== Lorimers ===
Located at the northeastern middle end the Island, this inland village is situated along Lagoon Inlet. It is the smallest of three villages on Middle Caicos.

=== Bambarra ===
Located east of Conch Bar about half a mile inland, this village is the second largest settlement on Middle Caicos. It is notable as the only town in the Turks and Caicos Archipelago that has a name of African derivation. The village was reputedly first settled by survivors of the Spanish slave ship Trouvadore that sank off Middle Caicos in 1842.

=== Conch Bar ===
The largest of the three villages on Middle Caicos, Conch Bar is the home of a primary school and government offices. The nearby Conch Bar Caves National Park hosts one of the largest cave systems in the Caribbean region. The karst limestone caves were used as a guano mine during the 1880s. Lucayan Indian artifacts and the skeletal remains of animals were reportedly uncovered by the digging, but were not preserved.
