= Ministerial ranking =

Ranking of senior ministers in the UK

The ministerial ranking, Cabinet ranking, order of precedence in Cabinet or order of precedence of ministers is the "pecking order" or relative importance or order of authority of senior ministers in the UK government.

== Use ==
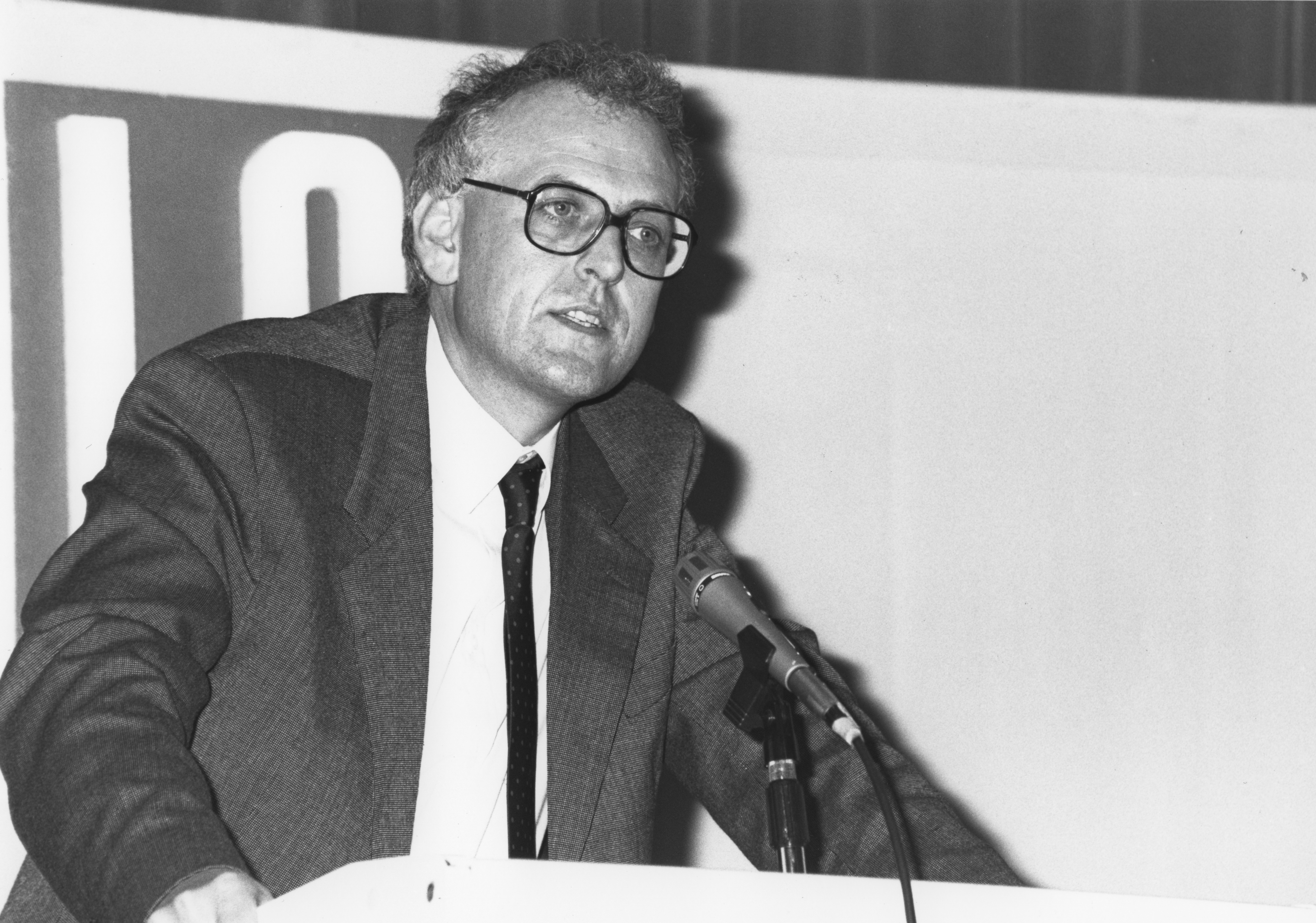
Lord Hennessy of Nympsfield wrote about the ministerial ranking, in his 2000 book The Prime Minister: The Office And Its Holders Since 1945.

The ministerial ranking is said by Peter Hennessy to be decided by the Prime Minister alone and the Cabinet Office Precedent Book notes it is wholly decided by the Prime Minister, "guided partly by tradition and partly by political and personal considerations". In his autobiography, David Cameron said that the ranking exercise "... combines seniority of post and the length of time as a cabinet minister to determine the rank of everyone present".

The Cabinet Manual states that when the Prime Minister is unable to attend Cabinet, or the chair and deputy chair of a Cabinet committee are absent, the next most senior minister in the ministerial ranking should take the chair. Thus the ranking does have real consequence in the administrative practice of the government of the UK.

One constitutional law academic, Rodney Brazier, has suggested that if the Prime Minister were to die suddenly, the monarch could ask the Deputy Prime Minister, or if there was no such person available, the next most senior MP in the ministerial ranking to take temporary charge of the government.

== Importance ==
Hennessy says that it "... matters more than one thinks in establishing the power of a Prime Minister in relation to his most senior colleagues" and Harold Wilson has been noted to be one prime minister to take the ranking seriously. It has been noted that it was through the ministerial ranking rather than being first secretary that George Brown was able to exercise "deputising duties". It has also been reported that, upon his 1995 appointment as deputy prime minister and first secretary, Michael Heseltine also insisted that he became number two on the ministerial ranking.

However, David Cameron has stated that it was "something we had never bothered with" and Harold Macmillan has reportedly said that he would have preferred an order based on the traditional dignity of offices, deeming it "all rather nonsense".

Additionally, in April 2020, when Boris Johnson was moved into intensive care with COVID-19, a government press release stated that he had asked First Secretary of State Dominic Raab "to deputise for him where necessary", but the ministerial ranking on the parliament.uk website around the time showed Rishi Sunak technically ranking above Raab.

== See also ==
- Orders of precedence in the United Kingdom
- Great Offices of State
- Cabinet of the United Kingdom
