= Dileeni Daniel-Selvaratnam =

British territorial governor

Her Excellency Dileeni Daniel-Selvaratnam
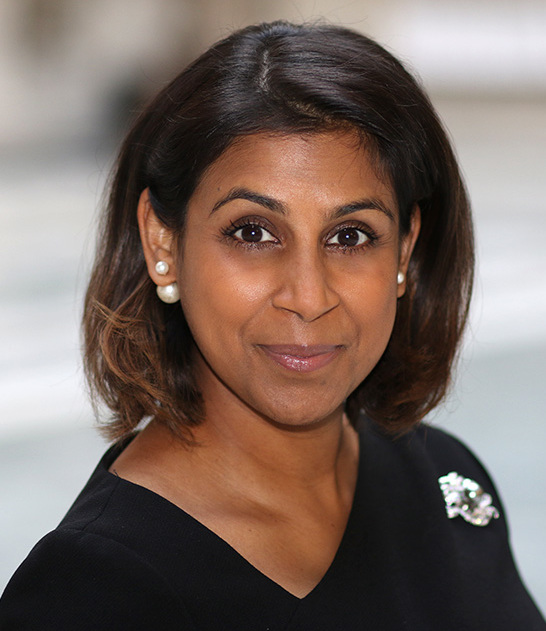

16th Governor of the Turks and Caicos Islands
- Incumbent
- Assumed office 29 June 2023
- Monarch: Charles III
- Premier: Washington Misick
- Preceded by: Nigel Dakin

14th Governor of Anguilla
- In office 18 January 2021 – 1 June 2023
- Monarchs: Elizabeth II; Charles III
- Premier: Ellis Webster
- Preceded by: Tim Foy
- Succeeded by: Perin Bradley (acting); Paul Candler (acting); Julia Crouch

Personal details
- Education: University of London

Dileeni Daniel-Selvaratnam is a British lawyer and civil servant who has served as Governor of the Turks and Caicos Islands since 29 June 2023. She served as Governor of Anguilla between 2021 and 2023.

== Civil service ==
Daniel-Selvaratnam is of Sri Lankan Tamil descent. She was called to the bar in 1999, and earned an LL.M. in Public International Law from the University of London in 2000. She completed her pupillage during 2000–2001 at 9 King's Bench Walk and 1 Inner Temple Lane.

From 2004 to 2007, Daniel-Selvaratnam was a policy advisor at the Department for Constitutional Affairs. She worked in different capacities at the Ministry of Justice from 2007 to 2015: Private Secretary to the Minister of State for Justice (2007–2010), Secretary to the Omand Review (2010), Deputy Head of Offender Management Strategy (2010–2011), and Deputy Director of Strategy and Change for HM Courts and Tribunals Service (2011–2015). Changing departments, she served for two years as Director of Strategy and Change for the Insolvency Service. In 2017, she joined the Cabinet Office as a Director for the Grenfell Tower Inquiry.

== Governor ==
Daniel-Selvaratnam's appointment as Governor of Anguilla was announced on 28 November 2020; she would be the second female governor of the territory after Christina Scott. She arrived in Anguilla on 15 January 2021, and began her duties remotely due to the 15-day quarantine mandate. She attended her swearing-in ceremony over video link on 18 January 2021. On 21 January 2021, she addressed a meeting of the Executive Council, and later met the opposition members of the House of Assembly. On 26 January 2021, she swore in a new magistrate, Piyumini Weeratunga, who had previously served as a magistrate in Montserrat.

After completing her quarantine, Daniel-Selvaratnam toured the Princess Alexandra Hospital and the "hotel belt". She followed up these visits with an island-wide tour. In each district, she met with the representing MP and local residents; she also discussed the upcoming COVID-19 vaccine rollout.

On 15 December 2022, the Foreign, Commonwealth, & Development Office (FCDO) announced that Daniel-Selvaratnam would be succeeding Nigel Dakin as Governor of the Turks and Caicos Islands in June 2023.

Government offices
Preceded by Tim Foy	Governor of Anguilla; 2021–2023	Succeeded by Julia Crouch
