= Governor of the Turks and Caicos Islands =

- Flag of the governor of the Turks and Caicos Islands

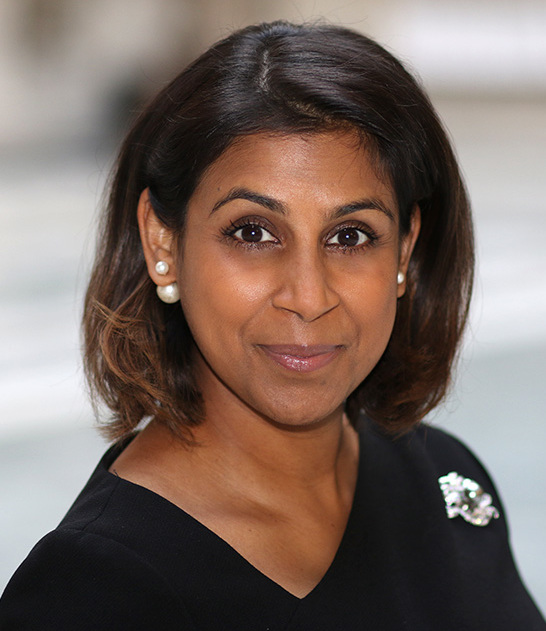
- Incumbent; Dileeni Daniel-Selvaratnam since 29 June 2023
- Viceroy
- Style: Her Excellency
- Appointer: Charles III as King of the United Kingdom
- Term length: At His Majesty's pleasure
- Formation: 1973; 53 years ago
- First holder: Alexander Graham Mitchell

The Turks and Caicos Islands are a British Overseas Territory governed through the Turks and Caicos Islands Constitution Order 2011, amended in 2024, that provides for a Governor, an elected Government consisting of a Ministerial Cabinet and an elected Parliament.

The Governor is appointed by the British monarch, to be his representative and to carry out key duties to support the people of the Islands, such as chairing Cabinet and ensuring the good governance of the Territory. The Constitution also reserves to the Governor responsibility for defence, external affairs, the regulation of international financial services; and internal security, including the police force. The Monarch also has the power to legislate for the Islands by Order in Council and to instruct the Governor through the British Government's Secretary of State for Foreign & Commonwealth Affairs.

Following elections, the Governor appoints the Premier of the Turks and Caicos Islands and on the Premier's advice, Government Ministers. The Governor chooses to appoint the Deputy Governor and Attorney General, who both sit in Cabinet and, on advice, senior officials such as the Commissioner of the Royal Turks and Caicos Islands Police Force and the Commanding Officer of the Turks and Caicos Islands Regiment. The Governor appoints the Chief Justice, Judges and other Judicial Officers on advice from the Turks and Caicos Islands Judicial Service Commission.

In August 2009, the United Kingdom suspended the islands' self-government after allegations of ministerial corruption. The prerogative of the ministerial government and the then House of Assembly were vested in the Governor until self-government was restored in 2012. In March 2020 the Governor, at the request of Cabinet, used his emergency powers to respond to the COVID-19 pandemic, which allowed the Governor to make laws and regulations without immediate reference to the legislature, although Cabinet consensus was maintained throughout.

The official residence of the Governor is 'Waterloo', on Grand Turk, named after the British defeat of Napoleon at the Battle of Waterloo in 1815, the year the residence was built. The Governor has their own flag in the Turks and Caicos Islands, the Union Flag with the territory's coat of arms superimposed.

== History ==
The islands were a dependency of Jamaica until that colony received independence in 1962. Afterwards the governor of the Bahamas oversaw affairs from 1965 to 1973. With Bahamian independence, the islands received a separate governor in 1973.

== Governors of the Turks and Caicos Islands ==
Image	Name	Term
	Alexander Graham Mitchell	1973–1975
	Arthur Christopher Watson	1975–1978
	John Clifford Strong	1978–1982
	Christopher J. Turner	1982–1987
	Michael J. Bradley	1987–1993
	Martin Bourke	1993–1996
	John Kelly	1996–2000
	Mervyn Jones	2000–2002
	Cynthia Astwood (acting)	2002
	Jim Poston	2002–2005
	Mahala Wynns (acting)	2005
	Richard Tauwhare	2005–2008
	Mahala Wynns (acting)	2008 – 5 August 2008
	Gordon Wetherell	5 August 2008 – 22 August 2011
	Martin Stanley (acting)	22 August – 12 September 2011
	Ric Todd	12 September 2011 – 15 September 2013
	Anya Williams (acting)	15 September – 9 October 2013
	Peter Beckingham	9 October 2013 – 10 October 2016
	Anya Williams (acting)	10–17 October 2016
	John Freeman	17 October 2016 – 15 July 2019
	Nigel Dakin	15 July 2019 – 29 March 2023
	Anya Williams (acting)	29 March 2023 – 29 June 2023
	Dileeni Daniel-Selvaratnam	29 June 2023 – present
