= Royal Marine Depot, Deal =

Barracks in Deal, UK

Royal Marine Depot, Deal
- Deal, Kent
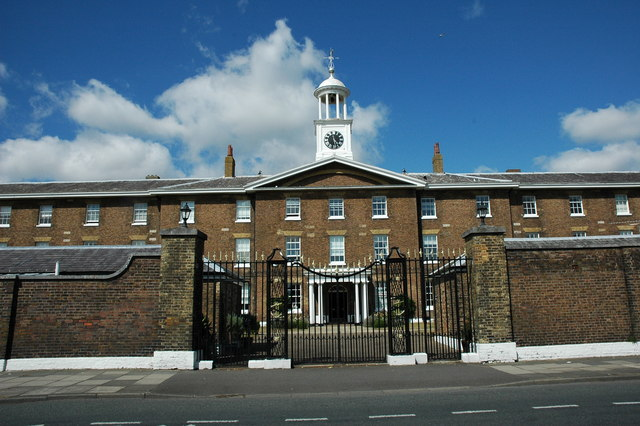
- Admiralty Mews (formerly East Barracks)

Site information
- Type: Royal Marines Base

Location
- Location within Kent
- Coordinates: 51.2175°N 1.4022°E

Site history
- Built: 1793
- Built for: War Office
- Architect: James Johnson, John Sanders, Edward Holl et al.
- In use: 1793-1996

Garrison information
- Occupants: Royal Marines

The Royal Marine Depot, Deal was a military installation occupied by the Royal Marines and located in an area between Lower Walmer and South Deal in Kent. The Depot (for training Royal Marine recruits) was first established in 1861, occupying part of the Royal Naval Hospital (which was linked to H.M. Naval Yard, Deal). In 1868 the Depot expanded and took over Walmer Barracks (the nearby 18th-century Army barracks); it was then generally referred to as the Royal Marine Depot, Walmer, but by the early 20th century it was officially listed as the Royal Marine Depot, Deal.

From 1930, Deal served as the headquarters of the Royal Naval School of Music (founded in 1903 to provide Royal Marines bands for ships of the Royal Navy). Renamed the Royal Marines School of Music after the Second World War, it expanded to provide musical training for both junior and senior recruits for all 36 Royal Marines bands.

In 1977 the training Depot closed; the site then became the headquarters of the newly re-formed 41 Commando and was renamed Royal Marines, Deal (however 41 Commando was disbanded just four years later). In 1988 parts of the site were demolished and sold for housing, leaving only the Royal Marines School of Music, which remained at Deal until 1996 whereupon it relocated to HMNB Portsmouth.

== History ==
What later became the Royal Marine Depot began as a complex of Army barracks: Cavalry Barracks, South Infantry Barracks and North Infantry Barracks (which began as an Army hospital), together with a separate Royal Naval Hospital. All had been established in the wake of the French Revolution, alongside what was Britain's nearest Naval station to the coast of France. In the early 1800s both hospitals were, in part, converted to provide additional barracks. The whole site was given over to the Royal Marines in the 1860s.

=== The Army (1794-1869) ===
Army links to the local area long predate the building of Walmer Barracks in the 1790s. As well as the nearby Device Forts (Walmer Castle, Deal Castle and Sandown Castle), there are records of an 'Old Barracks' in Queen Street, Deal, and it is likely that the Army used the area around Walmer for encampments from time to time.

In about the year 1789 a certain George Leith Esq purchased the Walmer Court Estate (his family having made money from, among other things, contracting to provide hospital services for the Admiralty - including in his home town of Deal). On 16 April 1794, Leith and his son (George Leith, junior) sold a portion of meadow land in Lower Walmer to the Board of Ordnance for the building of new barracks for the cavalry and infantry; work on the cavalry barracks was completed that same year, and the infantry barracks the year after.

==== Cavalry Barracks ====
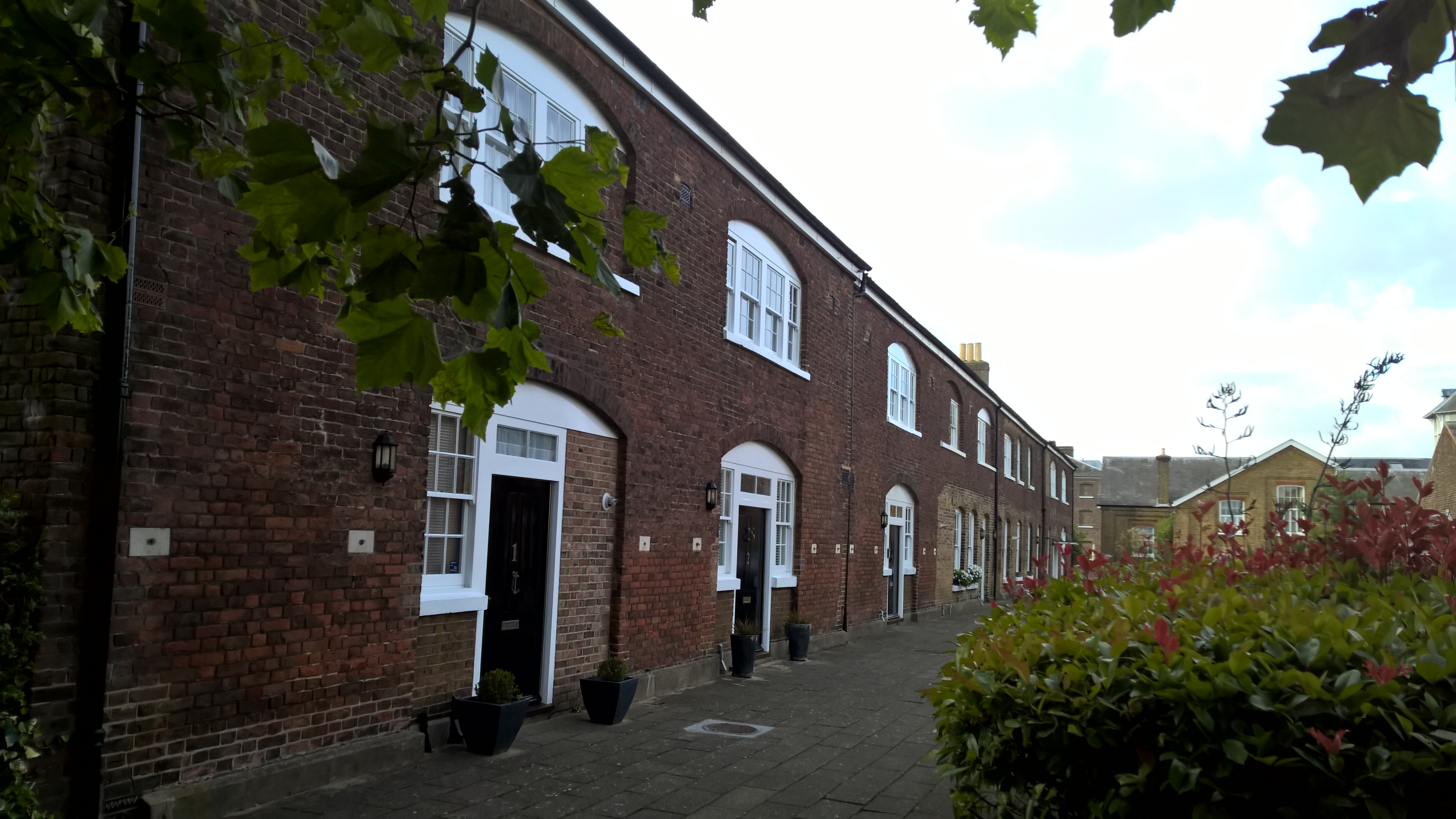
The earliest building on site: the original Cavalry Barracks of 1794.

The cavalry barracks (a single block dating from 1794) housed a single troop of 51 cavalrymen on the first floor with their horses stabled below and officers accommodated in the end sections; it was one of a number of similarly-sized cavalry barracks built around the south and east coast at this time. The 15th Light Dragoons were accommodated there from 1792 to 1815 - a convenient base during the Napoleonic Wars.

By 1848 Cavalry Barracks had expanded and accommodated 7 officers, 114 NCOs and privates, and 90 horses.

==== South Infantry Barracks ====
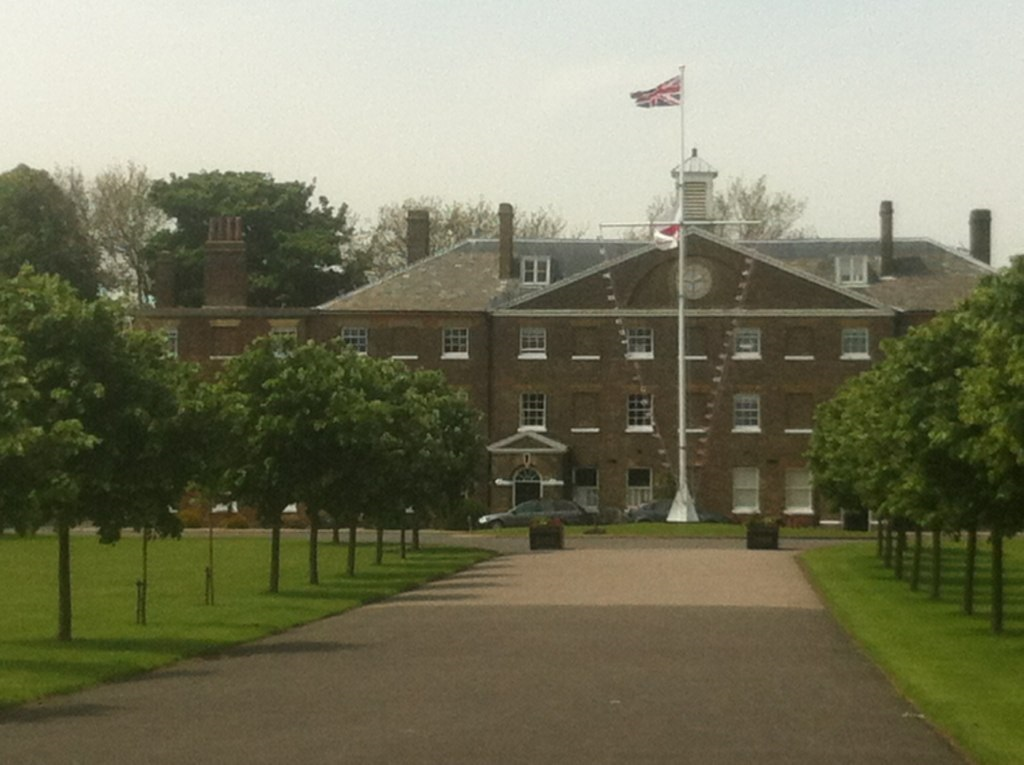
South Infantry Barracks: the former Officers' Quarters of 1795 (the quarter-chiming clock by J. W. Benson was added in the 19th century).

South Infantry Barracks (dating from 1795) were built in line with the cavalry barracks, on the same NE-SW axis, and consisted of three blocks: the central officers' accommodation (housing 7 field officers, 22 captains and 55 subalterns, together with their staff), flanked by a pair of soldiers' barrack blocks for the soldiers and NCOs (each holding over 900 men). These three buildings, together with the nearby cavalry barracks (all of which were designed by James Johnson and John Sanders) are clearly shown on William Mudge's 1797 map of Deal; still in situ, they are said to form "one of the most complete late 18th century barracks in the country".

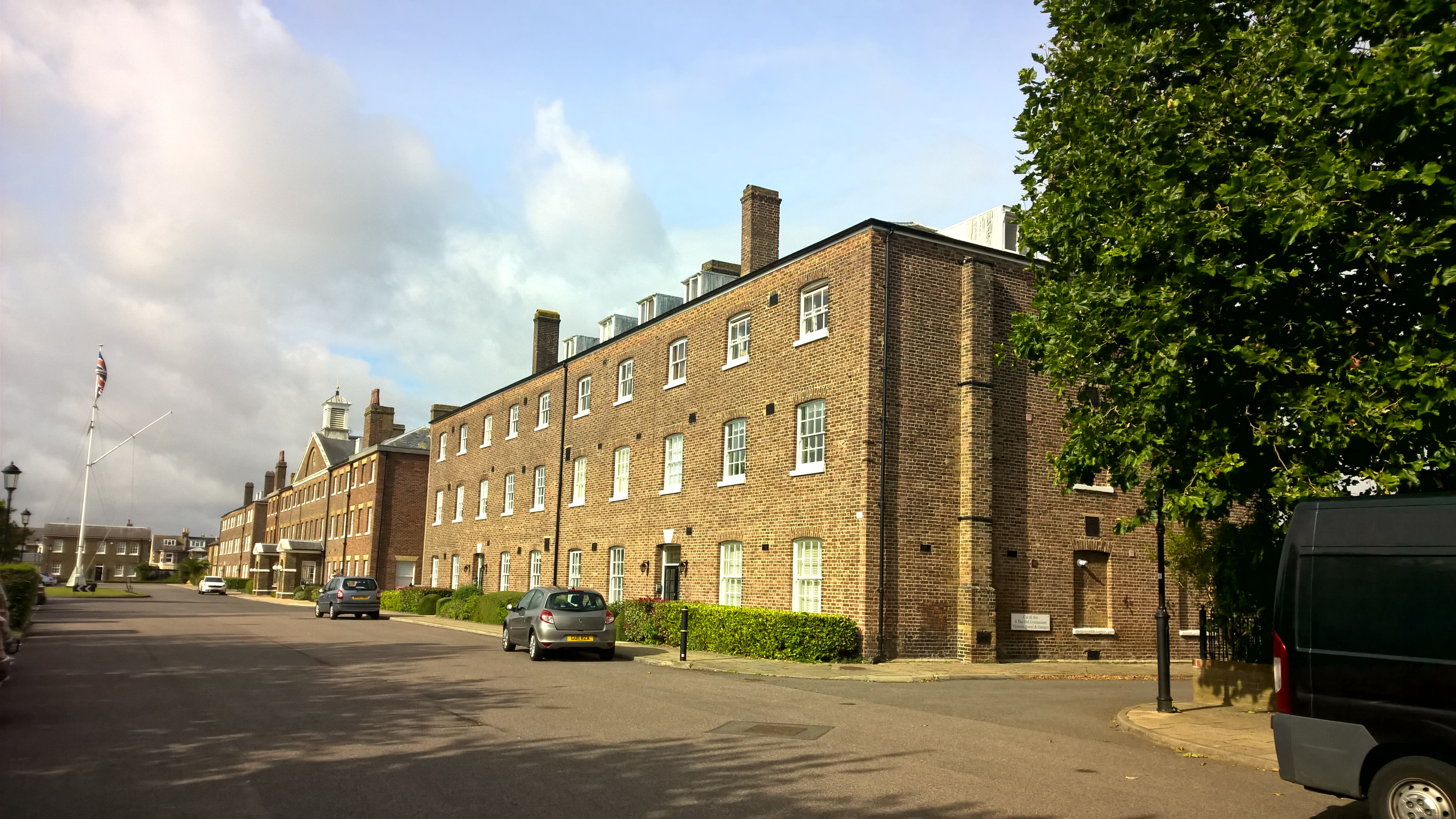
South Infantry Barracks: one of the soldiers' barracks flanking the officers' block.

Army units occupied the barracks from 1795; but following the end of the Napoleonic Wars their requirements decreased, and in 1816 part of the South barracks was instead used as quarters for 'blockade men', who were drafted against a threat of local smuggling (Deal was 'a hot-bed for smugglers' at that time). In 1831 the Coast Blockade for the Suppression of Smuggling was merged into the Coast Guard service; South barracks then became a coastguard station, and this duty continued until 1840. (During this time the Coastguard was akin to a reserve force for the Royal Navy.) Thereafter, the South Infantry Barracks accommodated various Line Infantry regiments until 1869, when the Royal Marines arrived; in 1848 it is described as having accommodation for 33 officers, 688 NCOs and privates, and 16 horses.

==== North Infantry Barracks ====
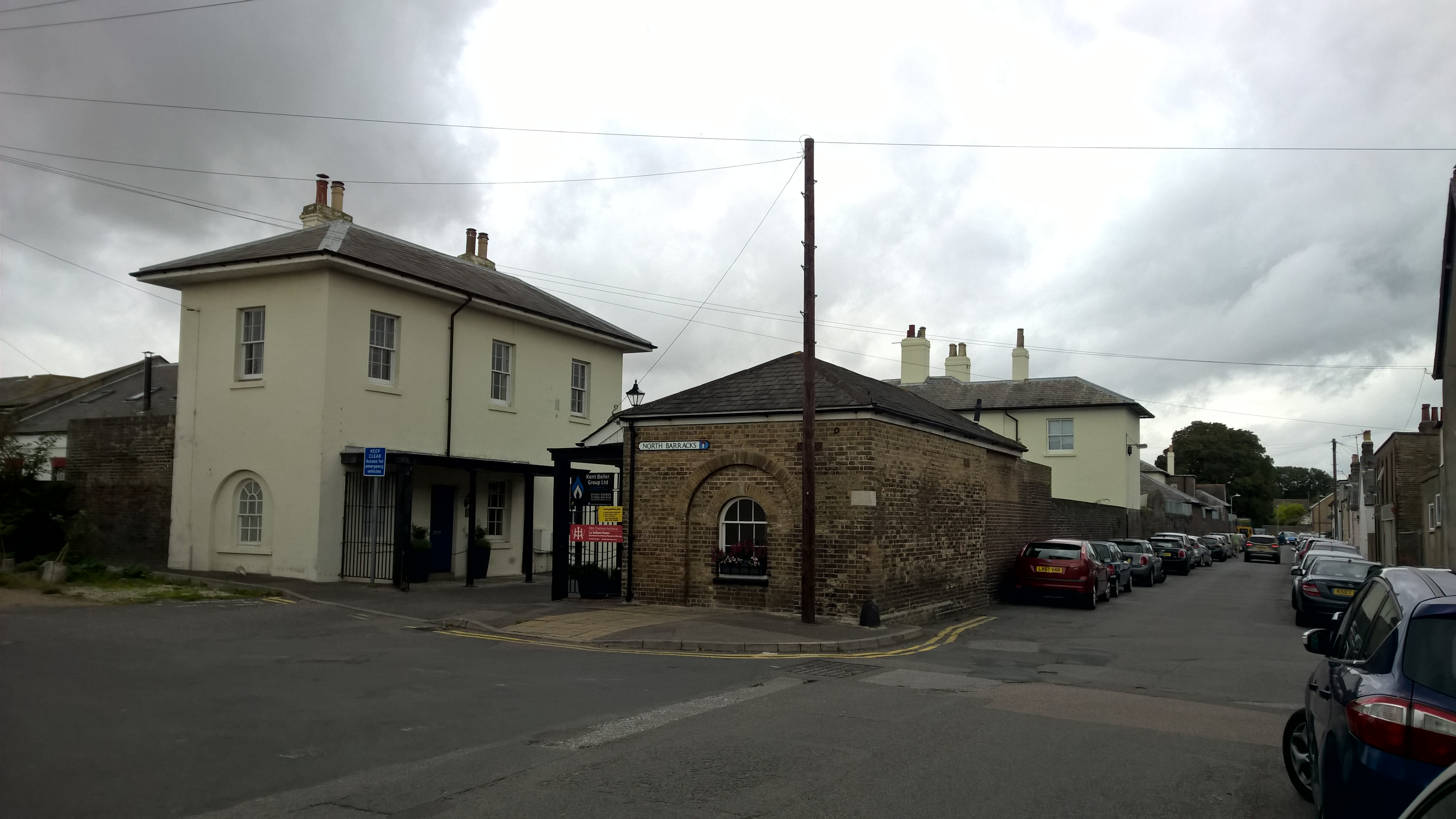
North Infantry Barracks: Georgian former guard house and gateway.

North Infantry Barracks, which opened in 1797, was originally built as an Army hospital, one of the first military hospitals in the United Kingdom. Its design (similar to that of the exactly contemporary Stoke Military Hospital in Stonehouse, Plymouth and Forton Military Hospital in Gosport) consisted of three ward blocks connected by an arcaded passage.

Over time, it began to be used as general barracks accommodation and a sizeable parade ground was laid out in front of the main range, flanked by houses for senior officers and others. By 1848 it is described as having accommodation for 27 officers and 418 NCOs and privates, along with a hospital for 120 patients. In 1858, a barracks school and chapel were built on Canada Road.

=== The Navy (1796-1869) ===
Again, the Navy' links to Deal long predate the 1790s, when the Royal Naval Hospital was established (which later formed part of the Depot). Deal was the nearest settlement to the Downs, a crucially important anchorage frequented by the Navy from its beginnings. In the course of the 17th century a Naval Yard was established, and subsequently expanded along the shoreline to the north of Deal Castle, to serve the vessels anchored off the shore.

In 1652, during the Commonwealth period, the Admiralty Committee hired a house in Deal to serve as a naval hospital (run under contract and staffed from Surgeons' Hall). In the mid-18th century, the aforementioned George Leith Esq. contracted to provide a naval hospital in the town.

==== Royal Naval Hospital ====
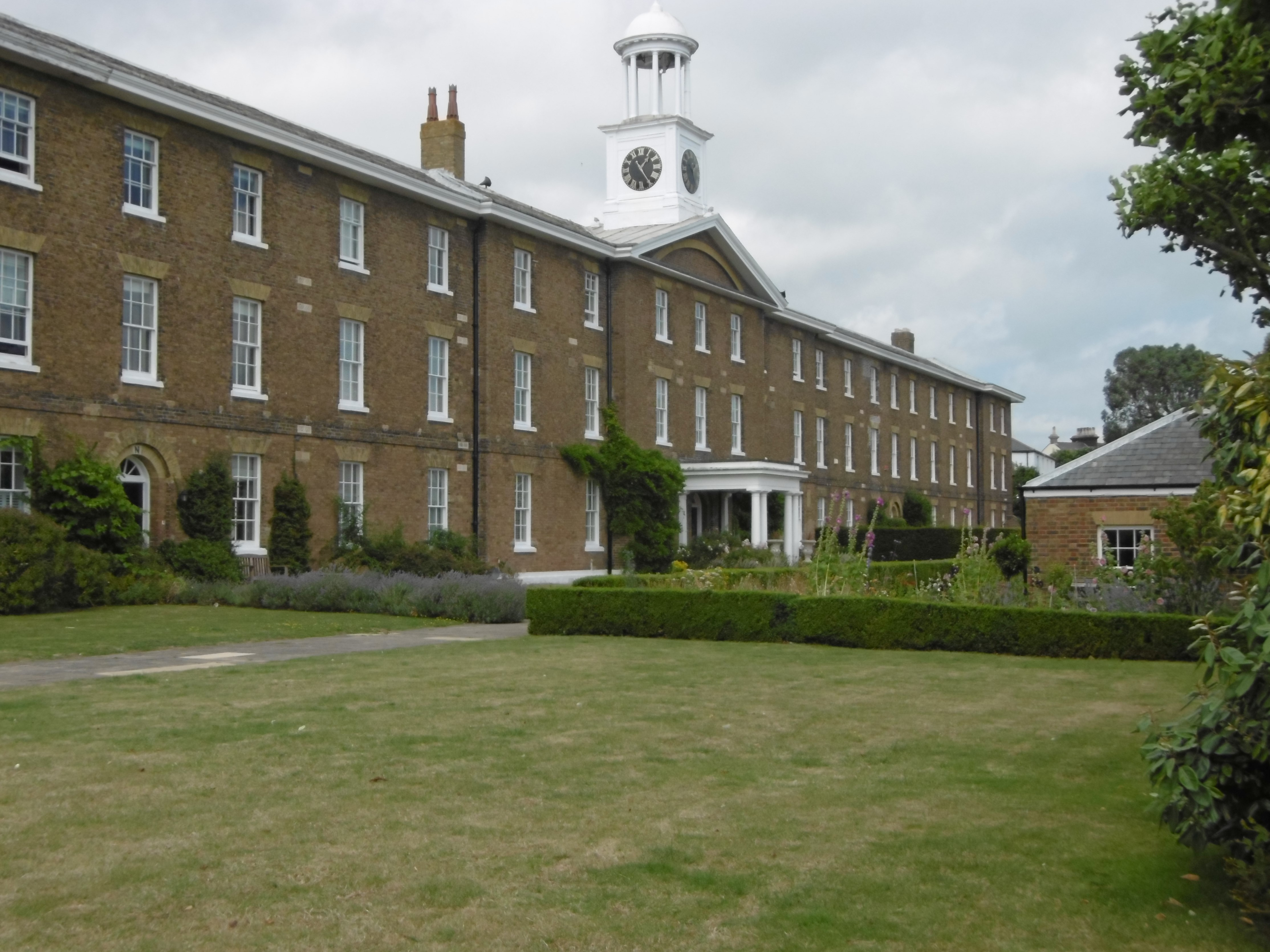
A view of the Royal Naval Hospital (later East Barracks); the clock was installed by Thwaites & Reed in 1812, when the hospital was rebuilt.

The Leith family opened a new hospital on the Strand in the late 1780s, and this was purchased by the Navy in 1796. A few years later plans were drawn up for its improvement and expansion: it was to have accommodation for 300 patients in wards arranged across all three floors. Wings extended behind the main frontage at either end; the longer wing to the south contained a laundry and wash house. The apsidal room to the rear of the main entrance was the operating theatre, which also served as a chapel. Separate buildings to the west included a cookhouse, the dispensary, 'rooms for insane patients' and a dead house (behind which was laid out a small cemetery). The new hospital was completed in 1804; however in 1812 a substantial part of the main block had to be rebuilt after the original structure was struck by lightning. Later, additional land was purchased and two pairs of large semi-detached houses were built, for the Governor, Physician, Surgeon and Agent of the hospital.

In 1864 HM Naval Yard, Deal was closed and the Admiralty sold the land to the Conservative Land Society, which demolished the remaining buildings and built 'first-class lodging-houses' on the site.

=== The Royal Marines (1869-1996) ===
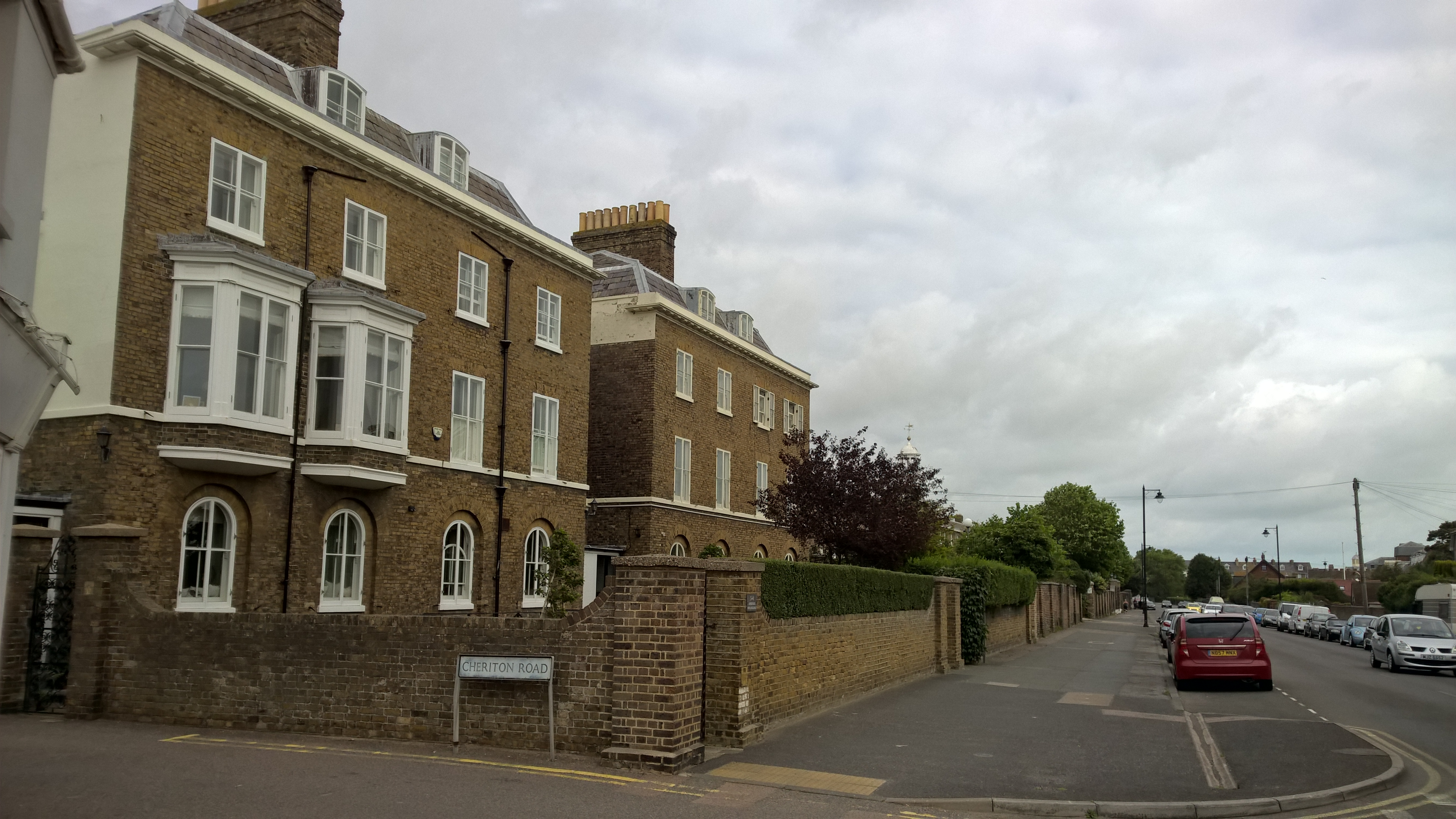
The officers' dwellings by the hospital later housed the Commandant and other senior officers of the RM Depot.

In 1861, the Royal Marine Depot, Deal was established within the hospital complex (to train recruits for the Royal Marine Light Infantry). Initially staffed by 2 officers, 12 NCOs and 33 privates, it welcomed its first 100 recruits on 10 May that year; by August it was fully operational with 400 recruits in training.

In 1869, the Royal Marine Depot expanded into North Infantry Barracks and South Infantry Barracks, which the Admiralty received in exchange for the Royal Marine Barracks, Woolwich, which were handed over to the War Office following the closure of Woolwich Dockyard. These were then re-named Royal Marine Barracks (North) and Royal Marine Barracks (South), while the Royal Naval Hospital complex was renamed Royal Marine Hospital Barracks (the hospital itself being classed as a Royal Marine Infirmary from the 1870s onwards). The Cavalry Barracks for the time being remained a separate entity, with a wall delineating its boundary with the South barracks. Later, a new row of buildings was built along the line of the boundary, on what is now Wilkinson Drive, providing an Armoury, recreation rooms and a Sergeants' Mess.

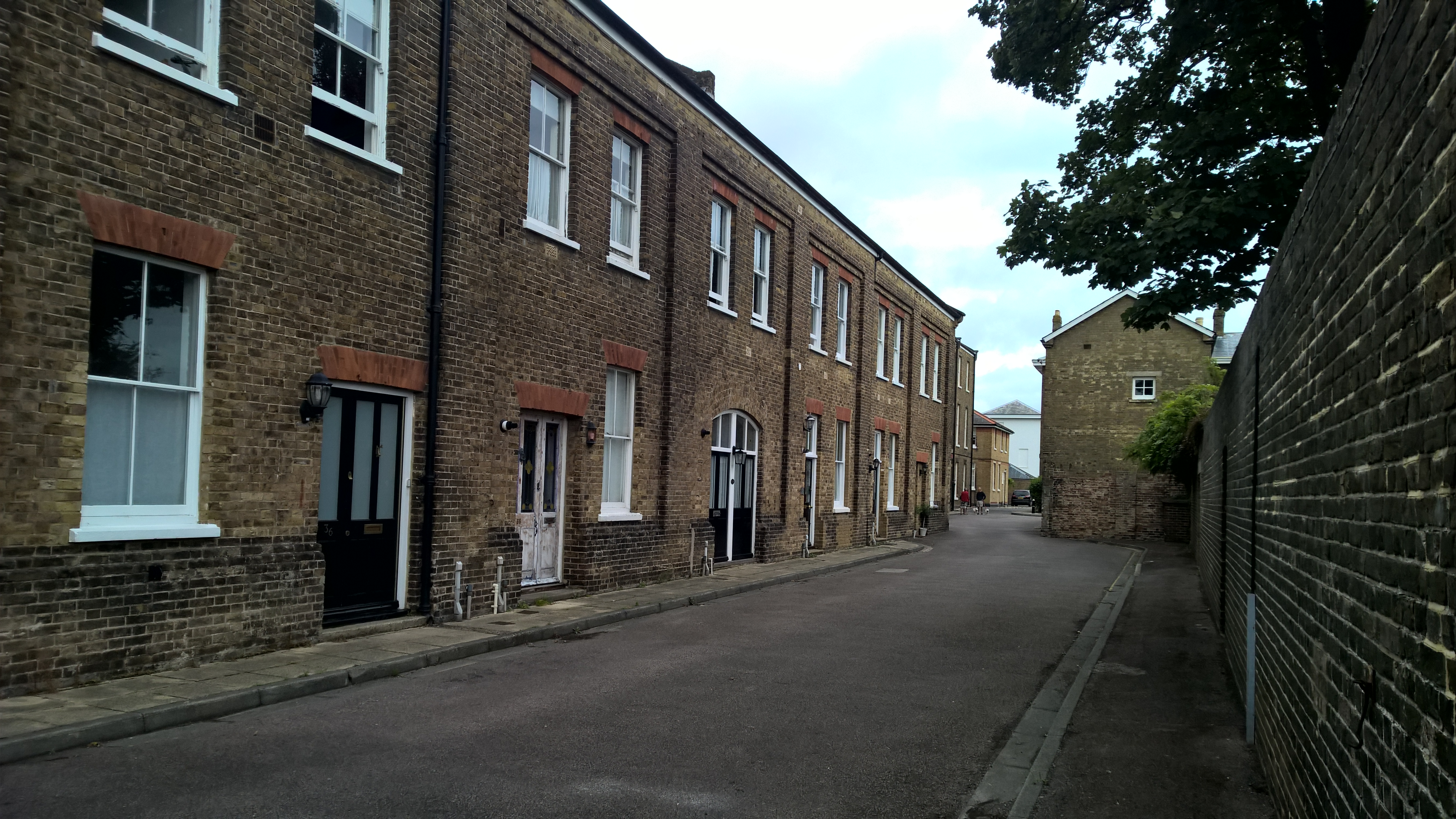
Barrack blocks built behind the RN Hospital in 1869-72 to accommodate the new and expanding RM Depot.

To accommodate the expanding depot, additional two- and three-storey blocks were added to the Hospital Barracks site, alongside the old cemetery at the back. RM Barracks (South) also had new buildings added, including a canteen (opposite the Cavalry barracks) and a gymnasium (built in connection with the RM Physical Training Instruction School, which was established in the Depot in 1871). In the late 19th century an iron-frame drill shed was added to the original Cavalry Barracks, which now backed on to its own three-sided quadrangle of buildings.

==== Expansion ====
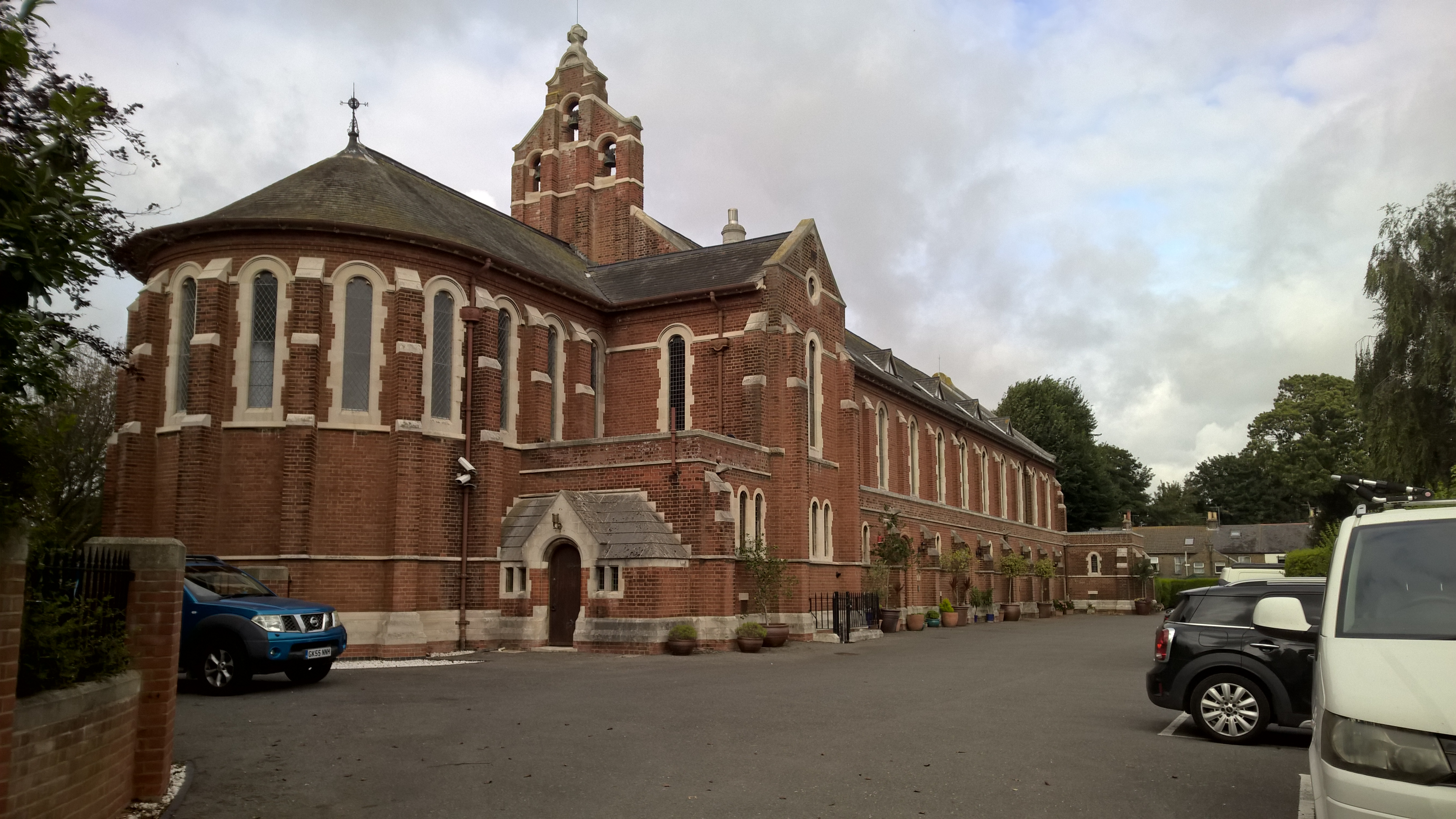
RM Depot Church of St Michael and All Angels (consecrated in 1907).

The barracks were extended in 1895-6 to provide much-needed additional accommodation: three new barrack blocks were added to RM Barracks (North), along with a drill hall behind the main block. In 1896, a parcel of land was purchased behind South Barracks to serve as a new, larger Drill Field.

In spite of these additions the Depot was still short of space. 2,871 young men were recruited in 1898; they were expected to do nine months' initial training at Walmer/Deal, before being despatched to their division (Chatham, Portsmouth or Plymouth) for further training, which was then followed by their initial sea service training. To help ease the overcrowding at Deal, the decision was taken that those destined for the Royal Marine Artillery division would instead be accommodated at Eastney for their initial training.

In 1899 on what had been the old Drill Field, west of the RM Hospital Barracks, a completely new Hospital was built for the Depot (later referred to as Infirmary Barracks); this enabled the old hospital to be given over entirely to barrack accommodation. The following year, what had been the 'Hospital Barracks' were re-named 'East Barracks', to avoid confusion with the new hospital, with the other areas referred to similarly as North Barracks and South Barracks (the latter now incorporated the old Cavalry Barracks, which served as married men's quarters and Depot offices). In 1905, work was begun on building a new Depot Church (similar in design to those at Eastney and Chatham) on a site alongside the new Drill Field; it was consecrated in January 1907 and dedicated to St Michael and All Angels.

In 1923 the Royal Marine Artillery (which had previously had its depot at Eastney) amalgamated with the RM Light Infantry to form a unified Royal Marines; thenceforward all recruits came to Deal for their basic training. In 1930 the Royal Naval School of Music relocated from Eastney into the East Barracks. In 1937 the Officers' Quarters in South Barracks was extended, with new wings added on either side.

During the Second World War, the RN School of Music was evacuated away from Deal and much training activity also moved elsewhere; however, a Non-Commissioned Officers' School was located in the East Barracks from 1940-1946. On 29 October 1940, the Royal Marines Depot was attacked from the air. The Battle of Britain campaign diary records: Army Stations 29 October 1940, Deal: At 1640 hours, three HE bombs were dropped in the barracks, the casualties being 1 Officer and 7 other ranks killed, 6 Officers and 6 other ranks wounded. In 1942, volunteers for the first Royal Marine Commando unit were assembled at Deal, where they undertook initial training and testing.

==== Rebuilding ====
After the war, Deal continued to be used for initial training of recruits (who would then move elsewhere for their commando training or other subsequent training). The (newly-renamed) Royal Marines School of Music returned to Deal in 1950; at the same time the old Divisional Bands of Portsmouth, Plymouth and Chatham were amalgamated to form the Royal Marines Band Service, which had its headquarters in the East Barracks. Boy Musicians (recruited from the age of 14) were accommodated in East Barracks, where they also received general schooling; SNCOs and trained musicians lived in North Barracks (or in the married accommodation by the old Cavalry Barracks). During the 1950s most of the old North Barracks buildings were demolished: the row of officers' houses on the south-west side of the parade ground were replaced in 1951 with a new Dining Hall and Naafi, and on the other side of the parade ground a striking new concrete shell-roofed Drill Hall was opened in September of that year (providing an interior space measuring 225 ft (69 m) long by 90 ft 9 in (27.66 m) wide, with no supporting columns). The original Georgian hospital/barrack blocks were demolished and replaced by a new accommodation block (containing 96 8-man dormitories and 12 single rooms for SNCOs), which was opened in 1956 by HM Queen Elizabeth The Queen Mother. At the same time the adjacent Victorian barrack blocks were updated. The old chapel and school in Canada Road now served as a Concert Hall and music theory rooms.

==== Withdrawal ====
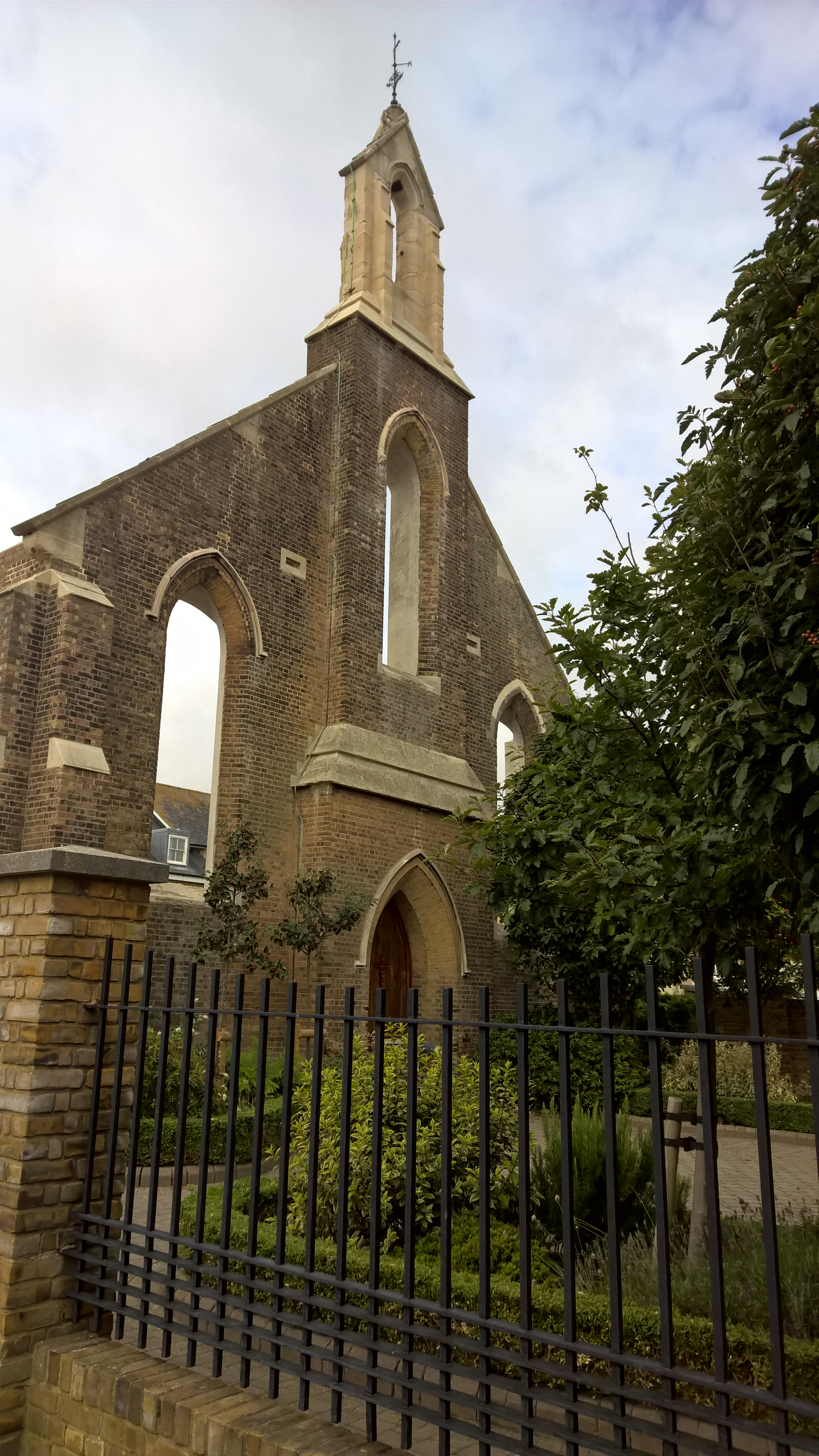
Remains of the RMSM Concert Hall alongside the 1989 memorial garden.

In 1977 the Royal Marines Depot, Deal closed as a training base, with all Phase 1 commando training now taking place at Lympstone. The following year, the Physical Training Wing (established in Deal in 1871) was also relocated to Lympstone. Most of the barracks accommodation was then filled by 41 Commando; but after it was disbanded in 1981 the Royal Marines School of Music was left in sole occupancy.

At approximately 8:20 am on 22 September 1989, a recreation centre in the North Barracks, part of the Royal Marines School of Music, was bombed by the IRA; the three-storey building was flattened, resulting in the deaths of 11 musicians, and injuries to 22 other marines. In 1989 a memorial garden was established, close to the site of the bombing, in the grounds of the former chapel and school. In 1993 a memorial bandstand was erected on Walmer Green. No one has ever been convicted over the deaths.

The depot was largely withdrawn from service in 1991 although the Royal Marines School of Music remained on site in the East barracks until 1996, when it relocated to HMNB Portsmouth.

== Redevelopment ==
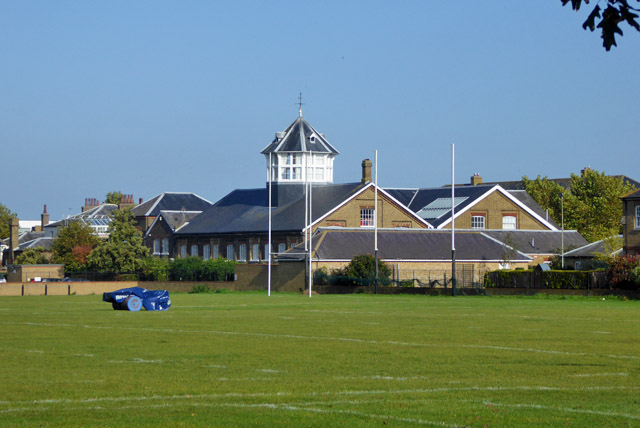
In 2005, the Old Gymnasium in the South barracks was renovated and it won the Building Renovation category in the Kent Design Awards.

The Depot site has largely been redeveloped to provide housing, though a large number of historic buildings remain (several of which are Grade II listed). South Barracks, which were converted to residential apartments in the early 21st century, are now known as the "Cavalry Barracks"; the East barracks were converted into private housing in 1997 and are now known as "Admiralty Mews". The modern North Barracks buildings were demolished; very little survives of the Georgian barracks here, except along the north-east boundary of the site: buildings flanking the main gate (including the former guard house), and a row of houses built to accommodate officers and surgeons; this area is now known as "The Churchills". Infirmary Barracks closed in 1988 and the buildings were demolished to make way for a private housing development now known as "Marine Mews".

In 2003 the former Concert Hall was destroyed in a fire. One wall has been left standing and the adjacent memorial garden has been preserved in place.

== See also ==
- Royal Marines Band Service
- History of the Royal Marines

== Publications ==
- Lane, Andrew, 2000. Royal Marines Deal. A pictorial history, Halsgrove Publishing, ISBN 1841140813
