= Gillingham Fair fire disaster =

1929 fire in Gillingham, England

Coordinates: 51.377°N 0.554°E

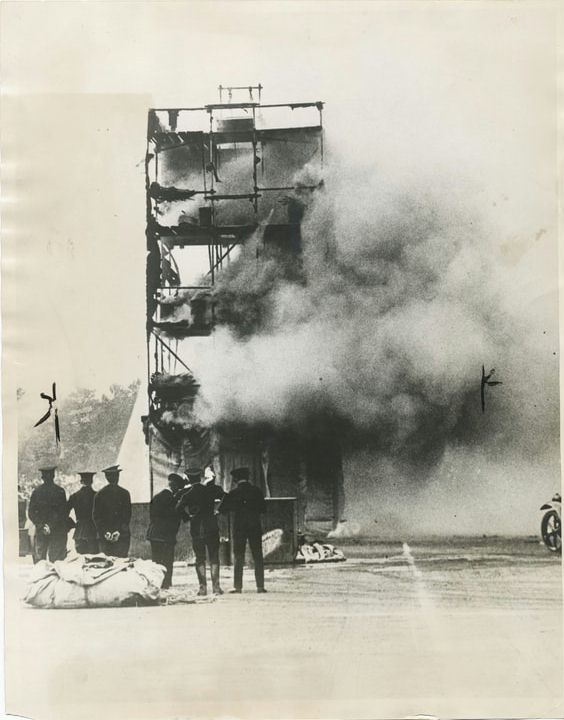
- Fire rescue demonstration structure, Gillingham Park, 1929
- Date: 11 July 1929
- Location: Gillingham, Kent, England
- Cause: Accident
- Deaths: 15

The Gillingham Fair fire disaster (also known as the Fireman's Wedding disaster) occurred on 11 July 1929 in Gillingham, Kent, England, when a firefighting demonstration went wrong, and resulted in the deaths of 15 men and boys.

== Background ==
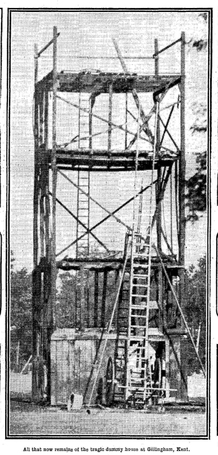
A fire rescue demonstration structure, Gillingham Park (undated)

Each summer in the 1920s, a fair was organized in Gillingham Park to raise funds for the local St Bartholomew's Hospital. The traditional highlight of the event, which took place at the end of the festivities, was a demonstration of firefighting and rescue by the Gillingham Fire Brigade.

Each year, a house of wood and canvas three storeys, or about 40 feet (12 m), high, was built in the park as the venue for a mock wedding reception at which two firemen, costumed as a bride and groom, would be entertaining their "guests": other firemen, Royal Naval Cadets from the nearby Chatham unit of the Volunteer Cadet Corps, and Sea Scouts.

The display would involve the simulated break out of a small fire necessitating the rescue of the occupants from the upper levels of the building. Flares and smoke bombs were used to give the illusion of the structure being ablaze, and after everybody had been "rescued" from the building, a real fire was set to enable the fire brigade to demonstrate their firefighting skills.

== Disaster ==
After the mock wedding, the six men and nine boys aged between 10 and 14 were ready to enact their staged rescue when the real fire was accidentally lit; the cause is unknown.

Flames instantly took hold and spread the full height of the structure, trapping the occupants inside. Other firefighters were immediately aware that they were now dealing with a genuine emergency rather than a demonstration, but initially most of the spectators did not realize anything was amiss, taking the cries for help they heard to be part of the performance, and reportedly cheering and applauding what they believed to be realistic and spectacular effects until they witnessed two boys with their clothing ablaze jump to their deaths from the top of the structure.

The fire was extinguished within a few minutes, but had been of such intensity that 13 people died at the scene. Two victims were rescued alive, but both died of their injuries in the hospital, St Bartholomew's, for which they had been intending to raise funds, bringing the final death toll to 15.

Funerals were held on 17 July; all shops in Gillingham remained closed on that day and thousands of people lined the two-mile funeral route. Over the years the graves became neglected. Canadian Lori Oschefski campaigned for the graves to be restored, and for a memorial to be erected. On 10 July 2011 a memorial to the fifteen people who lost their lives in the disaster was unveiled in Gillingham Park.

== Victims ==
(Sources:)

- Scout Reginald Henry Lewis Barrett (13).
- Cadet David Stanley Brunning (12).
- Cadet Eric Edward Cheesman (12).
- Fireman Francis Bull Cokayne (52).
- Royal Marine and former Fireman Royal George (Ronald) Mitchell (37).
- Leslie George Neale (13).
- Fireman Albert Joseph Nicholls (56).
- Petty Officer John Thomas Nutton (37).
- Cadet Leonard Charles Searles (10).
- Cadet and Scout Ivor Douglas Weston Sinden (11).
- Scout William Herbert Jack Spinks (13).
- Fireman Arthur John Tabrett (40).
- Robert Dennis Usher (14).
- Scout Leonard Gordon Winn (13).
- Frederick Arthur Worrall (30).

== See also ==
- 1951 Gillingham bus disaster – 24 boys killed in a later disaster in the same area
- Volunteer Cadet Corps
