= Martin Golightly =

English footballer

Personal information
- Full name: Martin Golightly
- Date of birth: October 9, 1891
- Place of birth: Gateshead, England
- Date of death: 1953 (aged 61–62)
- Place of death: Cleethorpes, England
- Position: Inside forward

Senior career*
Years	Team	Apps	(Gls)
1910–1911	Fatfield Albion		
1911–1912	Gateshead		
1912–1913	Exeter City		
1913–1914	Bideford		
1914–1919	Durham City		
1919–1920	Grimsby Town	9	(0)
1920–192?	Charlton's		
- * Club domestic league appearances and goals

Martin Golightly (1891 – 1953) was an English professional footballer who played as an inside forward. Before becoming a professional player, Golightly was a fireman on the North Eastern Railway. He began playing for St. Vincent College before he moved before signing for Gateshead in the North Eastern League where he scored 19 goals in 1911. He played for Exeter City in the Southern League from 1912-13. He later became player-manager of Bideford in 1920.
