= Volunteer Cadet Corps =

National youth charity

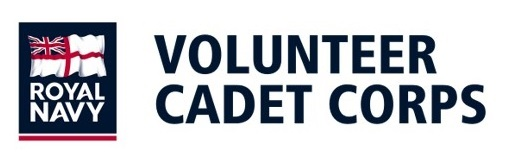
- Founded: 14 February 1901
- Country: United Kingdom
- Role: Volunteer Youth Organisation supported by the Royal Navy
- Size: 470 Cadets (as of 2023)
- Units: Headquarters (Whale Island, Hampshire); Plymouth (RM Stonehouse); Chivenor (Commando Logistic Regiment); Lympstone (Commando Training Centre RM); Portsmouth (HMS Excellent); Arbroath (RM Condor); HMS Excellent; HMS Collingwood; HMS Sultan; Band of the Royal Marines Volunteer Cadet Corps Gosport; Band of the Royal Marines Volunteer Cadet Corps Plymouth; Band of the Royal Marines Cadet Corps Scotland (HMS Caledonia); Volunteer Cadet Corps Training Centre
- Mottos: Latin: Occursum Provocatio; English: Meet the Challenge
- Website: www.volunteercadetcorps.org

Commanders
- Commander VCC: Lt Cdr Adam Hearn RN
- Deputy Commander VCC: Maj (VCC) Louis Colpitts

The Volunteer Cadet Corps (VCC) is a national youth organisation managed by the United Kingdom's Royal Navy and sponsored by the UK's Ministry of Defence.

== History of the VCC ==
The VCC traces its history back to the formation of the Royal Marines Artillery Cadet Corps (RMACC) in the Mission Hall, Prince Albert Street, Eastney on 14 February 1901. The new Cadet Corps was then based at the now closed Royal Marines Eastney Barracks in Portsmouth. It was formed, so the story goes, to "gainfully occupy the spare time of sons of senior Non-Commissioned Officers (SNCOs)" after an occasion when the colonel's office window was broken by a ball kicked by an SNCO's son playing outside.

The RMACC was initially formed with the motto 'Manners Maketh Man', and re-titled as the Royal Marines Volunteer Cadet Corps in the mid-20th century. Girls were accepted and the current title was adopted by all units in the 1970s. However, RMVCC Portsmouth only accepted girls from the mid-1990s.

Since 1901, units were also formed at the Royal Marine Barracks, Chatham, Deal, Kent, Forton Barracks, Gosport and Stonehouse Barracks, Plymouth. Later on, another unit was formed at Lympstone, Devon (Commando Training Centre Royal Marines). RMVCC Deal closed when the Royal Marines School of Music left the town and moved to HMNB Portsmouth; RMVCC Chatham transferred to the Sea Cadet Corps when Pay & Records Royal Marines left Chatham in the 1960s, and RMVCC Gosport was disbanded and then re-formed as a non-MOD cadet marching band in the 1970s following the traditions of the Royal Marines Light Infantry but closed again in 2006. Cadets from the RMVCC have appeared at Navy Days and the Royal Tournament as well as in the 1955 film The Cockleshell Heroes.

As of 6 July 2014, following a tri-partite RMC parade at Buckingham Palace in the presence of The Duke of Edinburgh (then Captain General Royal Marines) and in celebration of the 350th anniversary of the formation of the Royal Marines, all cadets from the RMVCC, RMSCC and RMCCF can be titled as Royal Marines Cadets.

The Royal Naval Volunteer Cadet Corps was formed in 1904 when the officer in charge of HMS Victory barracks in Portsmouth, now known as HMS Nelson, requested permission from Commander-in-Chief, Portsmouth to form a cadet corps unit similar to the Royal Marines Artillery Cadets in Eastney. The Admiralty granted permission and soon units were also established at HM Dockyard Devonport, HM Dockyard Chatham, HMS Dryad, HMS Daedalus, HMS Dolphin and HMS Vernon, as well as the three RNVCC units that still exist today. Entry was originally restricted to the sons of serving ratings but was later opened up to boys and girls from the general public. The date of the request, 29 July 1904, is regarded as the birthday of the Royal Naval Cadets.

Tragedy struck the RNVCC in 1929 when four Royal Naval Cadets were killed during the Gillingham Fair in what is now known as the Gillingham Fair fire disaster. There was equally a sad occasion in the Medway area when 24 Royal Marines Cadets from RMVCC Chatham were killed in the Gillingham bus disaster in December 1951.

Former Commander VCC, Lt Col (VCC) Ret’d Chris Spratt has been recognised by His Majesty The King in the 2024 New Years Honours List and is awarded an MBE for Services to the Volunteer Cadet Corps.

The Volunteer Cadet Corps made history on 21 Apr 2026, becoming the first youth organisation to conduct the Ceremony of the Constable’s Dues at the Tower of London, as part of the 125th anniversary celebrations. A tradition that dates back over 700 years.

== Structure and Organisation ==
The VCC comprises:

- Headquarters VCC. Based at HMS Sultan in Portsmouth.
- VCC Training Centre. Based at HMS Collingwood.
- Royal Naval VCC. Units in HMS Collingwood, HMS Excellent and HMS Sultan.
- Royal Marines VCC. Units (Divisions) in Arbroath, Chivenor, Lympstone, Portsmouth, Gosport and Plymouth. plus the Band of the RMVCC Plymouth, the Band of the RMVCC Gosport and the band of the RMVCC Scotland

The VCC is not part of the Sea Cadet Corps but exists alongside it as part of the Royal Navy's 'Navy Cadets' organization, which also includes CCF(RN) and RN Recognised Sea Scouts. The Royal Marines Volunteer Cadet Corps are part of the Royal Marines Cadets family alongside the Royal Marines Cadets of the [Sea Cadet Corps and Combined Cadet Force.

Each VCC unit is staffed by unpaid adult volunteers, some with former military service, and sometimes with current serving personnel helping the Cadet Corps in addition to their duties. The units are under the command of their own Commanding Officers (usually a cadet force adult volunteer (CFAV)) who report into HQVCC. The VCC is led by Commander VCC who is assisted by Deputy Commander VCC, Executive Officer (Training) and Executive Officer (Support). There are also a Regional Officer (South) and a Regional Officer (West.) The VCC as a whole does not have charitable status but each unit is either a charity or in the process of applying.

Each VCC unit is either based within or provided support from a designated Royal Navy parent establishment. The CO of the parent establishment (COPE) acts as the President of each unit and appoints a senior officer from their staff to act as the Parent Establishment Liaison Officer (PELO) to ensure that the CO is running their unit in accordance with the VCC Regulations.

Sponsorship within the Royal Navy is provided by HQ Royal Navy Cadet Forces (HQRNCF) (branded as 'Navy Cadets') under the command of the Head of Youth & Cadets and STEM who in turn reports to the Director of Strategy and Policy via the Naval Regional Commander NE England. The support provided to the VCC is governed by a Memorandum of Arrangements (MOA) approved by the Second Sea Lord. The VCC does not have an associated civilian charity or association and has always been under the command of the Royal Navy. In this way the VCC is very much 'owned' by the Royal Navy.

The RMVCC shares the Colonel Commandant Royal Marines Cadets (CCRMC), currently Brigadier Ged Salzano MBE, with the Royal Marines Cadets elements of the SCC and CCF.

The VCC's slogan is 'Meet The Challenge!' (which appears in its Latin form on the VCC Crest) whilst the motto is 'Be Worthy'. The former motto of the RMVCC was 'Manners Maketh Man' and whilst it not known when this changed to 'Be Worthy' the new motto has been in use for at least 50 years.

== Funding ==
The VCC receives a modest capitation grant from central government each year, but otherwise is self-funding apart from the logistical support each unit receives from their parent establishments. Additional funding is usually self-raised through events and display groups, plus donations and subscriptions/joining fees paid by the cadets.

== Membership ==
The VCC will accept boys and girls between the ages of 9 and 16 who can serve until their 18th birthday. The VCC is not a pre-service organisation, although any older cadets who show an interest in joining any branch of the British Armed Forces will be given appropriate support and guidance. Many cadets go on to equally rewarding civilian careers. Adult volunteers may join from age 18 to 60 (65 for non-uniformed support staff) subject to application, interview, references, enhanced DBS check and a probationary period (during which time they will undergo an induction programme).

== Activities and Training ==
Cadets can take part in a variety of activities including:

- Drill.
- Camps including Weekends and Summer Camp.
- Fieldcraft.
- Military skills (i.e.: camouflage and field exercises).
- Navigation (including Ten Tors on Dartmoor).
- Seamanship.
- Band.
- Sports and gymnastics.
- Target shooting.
- Parades.

Boys and girls join their chosen VCC unit as 'recruits' and undergo a 4 to 5 month basic training period before 'passing out' for duty during a ceremonial parade in front of family and friends. Where a unit has a band cadets can choose either to become a musician or drummer, or proceed to Naval General Training (RNVCC) or General Duties Training (RMVCC). Cadets then follow the VCC's Cadet Common Military Syllabus (CCMS) and progress through a number of phases and command courses to achieve promotion.

Each unit usually meets on two training nights per week, and some unit offer extra activities such as evening swimming lessons. There are also many weekends away and a week long annual summer camp.

The VCC also provides Display Teams that appear at public events in the South West and South East of England, and sometimes further afield. In recent times, the VCC has appeared at the Castle Combe Steam Rally, Cumbria Steam Rally, Attleborough Tattoo, Kirkcudbright Tattoo and the Battle of the Flowers in Jersey. The Display Teams generally provide a 20 to 25 minute display and are ideal for fetes, fayres, tattoos, carnivals and other such public events. A modest donation is asked for, which is put towards the cost of attending, and any funds left over are put back into the VCC to fund its other activities.

== Ranks ==
=== VCC Rates and ranks ===
Boys and girls enter as a Recruit, and having 'passed out' at the end of their basic training become a cadet. Command Courses allow the cadets to progress up through the rates:

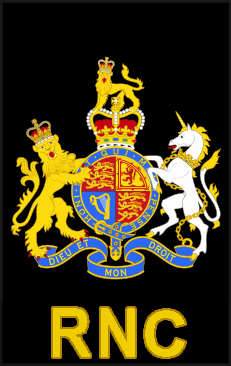
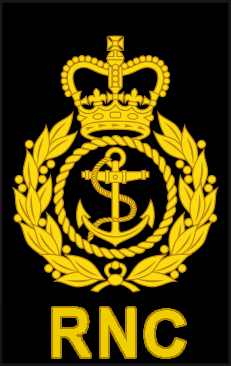
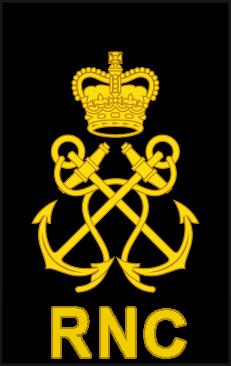
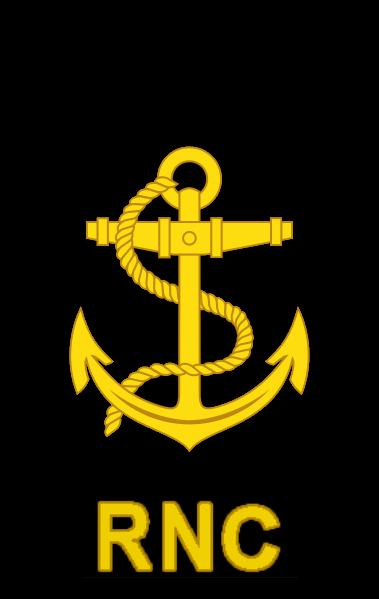
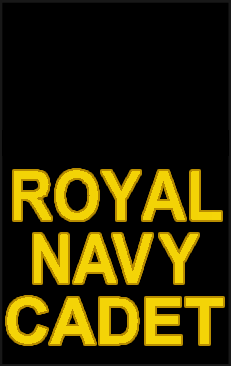
Royal Navy Volunteer Cadet Corps								No insignia
Royal Navy Volunteer Cadet Corps	Warrant officer cadet		Chief petty officer cadet	Petty officer cadet	Leading cadet	Able cadet	Naval cadet	New naval entry
Royal Navy Volunteer Cadet Corps	WOCDT		CPOCDT	POCDT	LCDT	ACDT	NCDT	NNE
Royal Marine Volunteer Cadet Corps							No insignia	No insignia
Royal Marine Volunteer Cadet Corps	Cadet warrant officer first class	Cadet warrant officer second class	Cadet colour sergeant	Cadet sergeant	Cadet corporal	Cadet lance corporal	Cadet	Recruit
Royal Marine Volunteer Cadet Corps	CDTWO1	CDTWO2	CDTCSGT	CDTSGT	CDTCPL	CDTLCPL	CDT	RCT

== Adult Volunteers ==
All uniformed and non-uniformed staff (cadet force adult volunteers or CFAVs) undergo enhanced DBS (formerly CRB) checks and a 3 to 6 month probationary period before being confirmed as a CFAV. Training is offered to all staff, including safeguarding, both locally and through RN, RM and SCC shared resources. Applications are welcomed from all walks of life (subject to intended level of involvement) and previous military experience is not a basic requirement; a willingness to learn and be an example to the cadets very much is however. CFAVs follow the same ranks as cadets above Petty Officer and Sergeant respectively but with VCC added. Some CFAVs may be awarded a Cadet Forces Commission subject to selection and approval by the Royal Navy.

Uniformed staff may serve until their 65th birthday (with annual extensions at CO's discretion) and non-uniformed staff may serve until their 70th birthday (again, with annual extensions at CO's discretion).

=== Chief Cadet VCC ===
In November 2019 Ant Middleton was appointed as Chief Cadet in the Volunteer Cadet Corps. He left the position nine months later amidst controversy surrounding a comment he made on Twitter, which appeared to compare Black Lives Matter protesters with the English Defence League as extremists and "scum", though he later said he was not equating the two groups.

== See also ==
Elements of the Community Cadet Forces

- Sea Cadet Corps
  - Royal Marines Cadets
- Army Cadet Force
- Air Training Corps

Other MoD sponsored cadet forces

- Combined Cadet Force

Related articles

- Cadets (youth program)
- Cadet Vocational Qualification Organisation (CVQO)
- Reserve Forces and Cadets Association
- 1929 Gillingham Fair fire disaster
- 1951 Gillingham bus disaster
