= Forton Barracks =

Military building in Hampshire, England

Forton Barracks
- Gosport, Hampshire
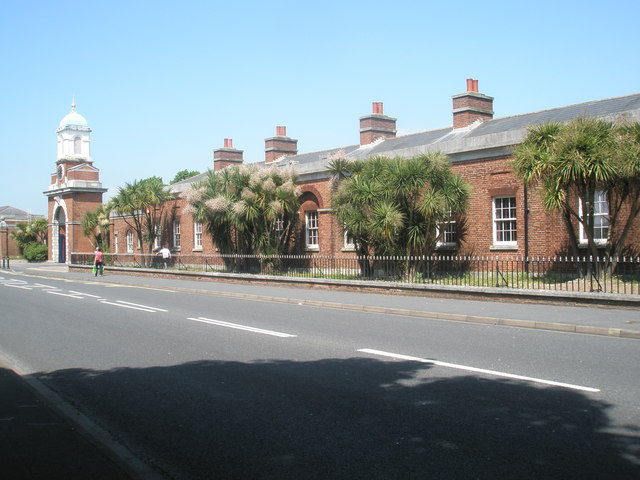
- Forton Barracks

Site information
- Type: Royal Marines Base

Location
- Location within Hampshire
- Coordinates: 50.800°N 1.136°W

Site history
- Built: 1807
- Built for: Admiralty
- In use: 1807-1923

Garrison information
- Occupants: Portsmouth Division, Royal Marines

Forton Barracks was a military installation near Gosport in Hampshire, which served first as an Army barracks and then as a divisional headquarters for the Royal Marines. It subsequently served as a Royal Navy training establishment. Today, the site is occupied by St Vincent College.

== History ==
Towards the end of the 18th century the owner of Forton Mill sold an adjacent parcel of land to the Board of Ordnance, to serve as the site for an Army General Hospital. Forton Military Hospital was begun in 1797; by 1800, however, soldiers were being treated at the nearby Naval hospital at Haslar, so the decision was taken to alter the proposed hospital buildings to serve as a barracks instead. The Barracks opened in 1807, consisting of four tall pavilions connected by arcades (an arrangement very similar to that of the contemporary military hospitals at Plymouth and Deal). The pavilions faced the main entrance gate (which was flanked by officers' quarters) across a sizeable parade ground, believed for a time to have been the largest in the country. Over the next forty years the barracks housed a succession of different regiments. The pavilions were capable of accommodating 832 men plus 48 sergeants; however by the 1840s one pavilion was still serving as a hospital, another had had its ground floor converted into the officers' mess and elsewhere space was taken up by school rooms, workshops and stores.

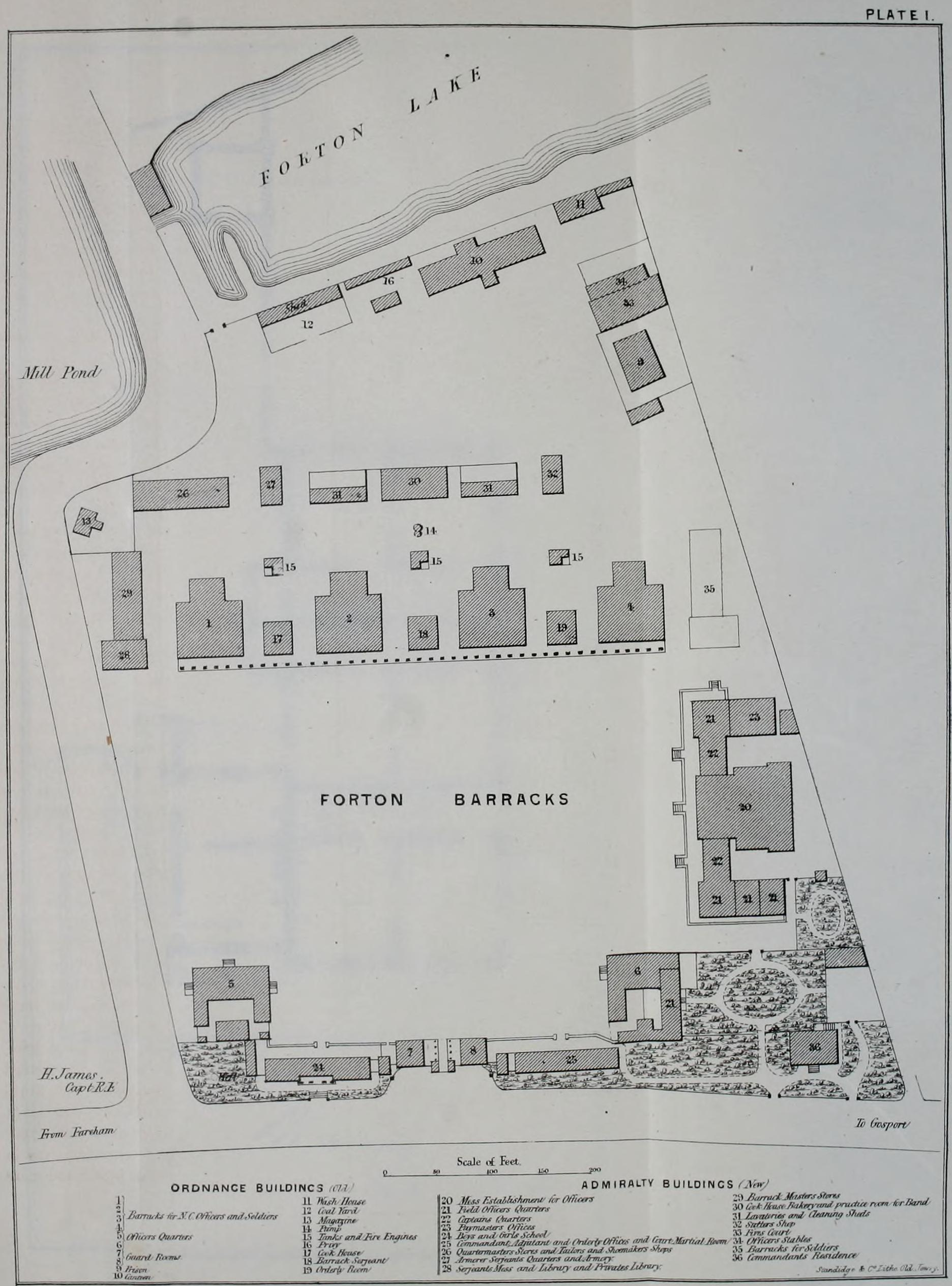
1852 Map of the barracks, including new additions, by Capt. Henry James.

At this time the Portsmouth Division of the Royal Marines resided in Old Portsmouth in premises which had formerly been a 17th-century brewery and cooperage: Clarence Barracks. Fast outgrowing their accommodation there, an arrangement was reached whereby the Board of Ordnance exchanged Forton Barracks for Clarence (which was adapted to accommodate troops of the garrison Artillery), allowing the Marines to move into Forton. To accommodate a full Royal Marine division, the barracks needed to expand: Captain Henry James R.E. oversaw the project, which included provision of a large officers' mess, along with additional officers' accommodation, to the east of the parade ground and a sergeants' mess west of the pavilions. The officers' mess included space upstairs for 80 diners plus a 30-piece orchestra, with a library and breakfast room provided downstairs along with kitchens to the rear. James also built two long single-storey blocks (to serve as a school and as offices) either side of the main gate, which he expanded with the addition of a clock tower, and he provided various buildings for stores and other amenities behind the main barrack blocks.

The Royal Marines took possession of the barracks in 1848. Shortly afterwards they were retitled the Royal Marine Light Infantry (to distinguish them from the Royal Marine Artillery, who had their own separate barracks alongside the Gunwharf on the other side of the harbour). In 1858 the mill and millpond were purchased by the Admiralty; the millpond was drained became part of the site. By 1862 additional barrack blocks had been built between the old pavilions so as to accommodate the full complement of over 1000 men; further expansion, with the construction of married quarters for officers, took place in the 1890s. A 400-seater theatre was built within the site in 1893.

In 1922 defence cuts meant that Portsmouth Division of the Royal Marine Light Infantry and the Royal Marine Artillery were amalgamated. The newly created Portsmouth Division of the Royal Marines moved to Eastney Barracks in August 1923 leaving the site empty.

In 1927 the Barracks were recommissioned as HMS St. Vincent creating a Royal Naval training establishment for boy seamen and juniors. It continued as a shore establishment with the Royal Navy until 1969.

== Cadets ==
In 1904 a division of the Royal Marines Light Infantry Cadet Corps was established. This was based on the successful Royal Marines Artillery Cadet Corps at Eastney Barracks and was part of the Royal Navy's Volunteer Cadet Corps. The Forton Division RMLI Cadet Corps closed some years later but today's Gosport Division Royal Marines Volunteer Cadet Corps carries on its traditions albeit based at HMS Sultan.

== Gallery ==
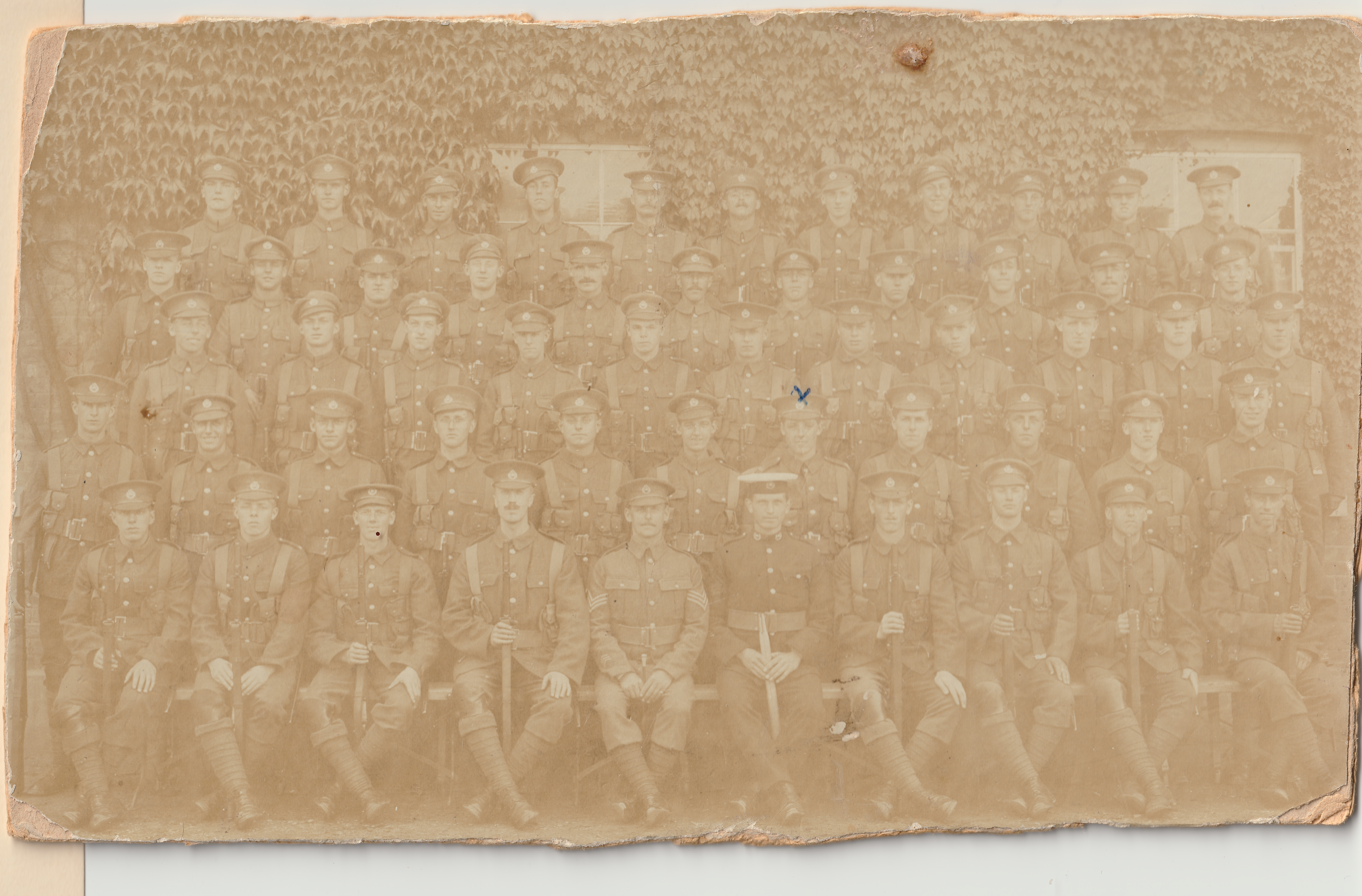
Royal Marines Squad M23 at Forton Barracks in 1917

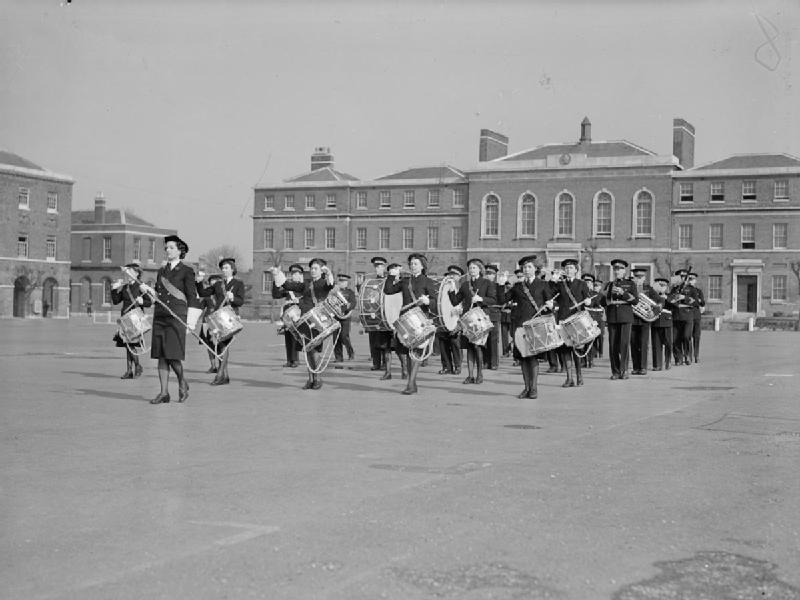
Wartime parade at HMS St Vincent; in the background is the Officers' Mess of 1848

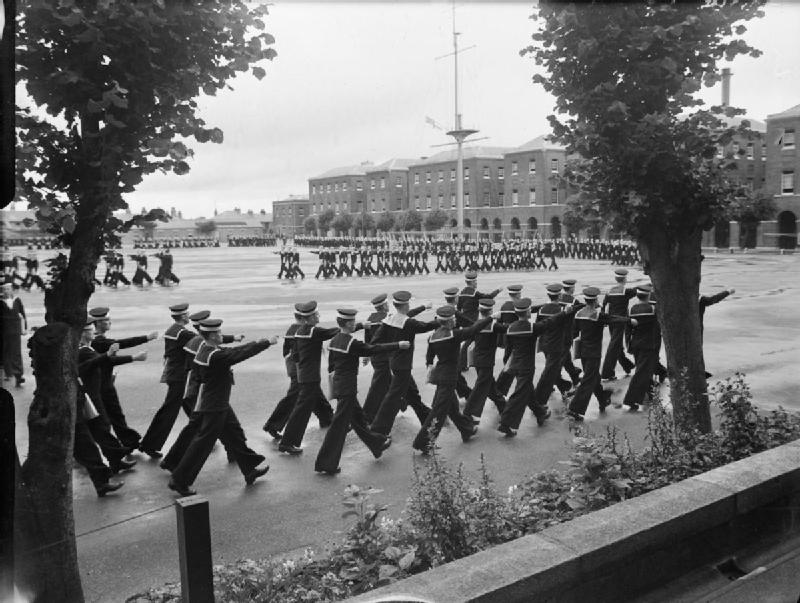
Parade ground, HMS St Vincent; beyond it, the original pavilions of 1807

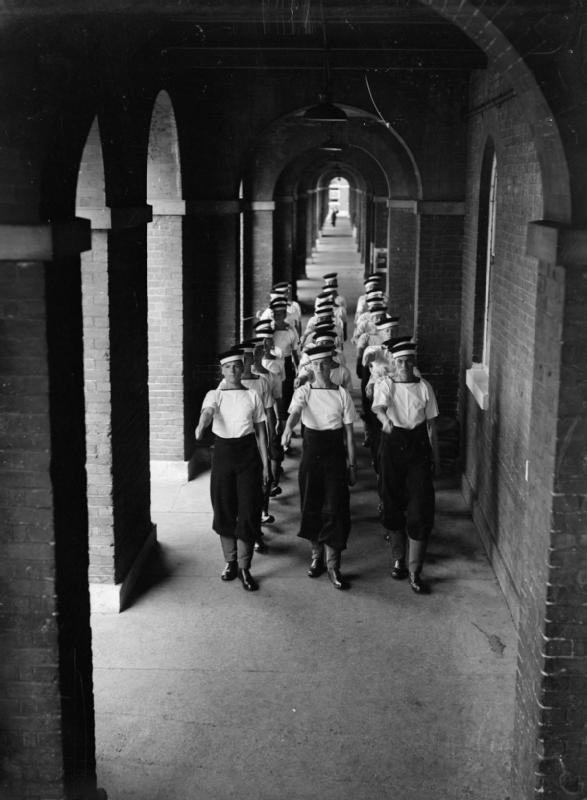
The 1807 arcade linking together the pavilions of the old barracks

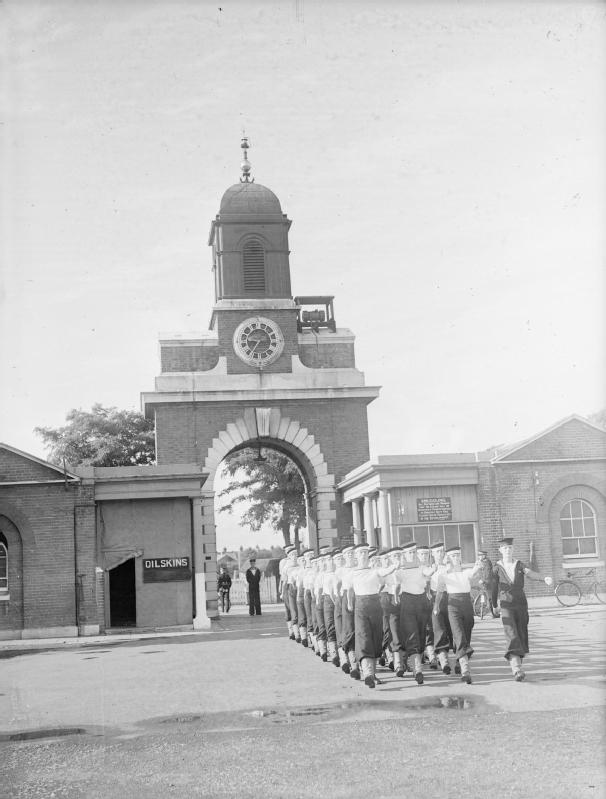
HMS St Vincent: inside the main gate
