= Royal Marines Volunteer Cadet Corps =

- Royal Marines Volunteer Cadet Corps
- Founded: 14 February 1901
- Country: United Kingdom
- Role: Volunteer Youth Organisation
- Size: 300 Cadets
- Unit locations: Plymouth; Lympstone; Portsmouth; Arbroath; Gosport; Chivenor
- Motto: Be Worthy
- Website: www.volunteercadetcorps.org

Commanders
- Commander VCC: Lt A J Hearn RN
- Adjutant RMVCC: Lt (VCC) G Langworthy

The Royal Marines Volunteer Cadet Corps (RMVCC) is part of the Royal Navy's Volunteer Cadet Corps. There are units (Divisions) in Arbroath, Chivenor, Gosport, Lympstone, Portsmouth, and Plymouth.

The RMVCC exists alongside the Royal Marines Cadets of the Sea Cadets and Royal Marines Section Combined Cadet Force, and is part of the Royal Navy Cadet Forces. The RMVCC is the oldest of the Royal Marines Cadets organisations.

== History ==
The RMVCC traces its history back to the formation of the Royal Marines Artillery Cadet Corps in the Mission Hall, Prince Albert Street, Eastney on 14 February 1901 by the Admiralty. The new Cadet Corps was based at the now closed Royal Marines Eastney Barracks in Portsmouth. It was formed, so the story goes, to "gainfully occupy the spare time of sons of senior Non-Commissioned Officers (SNCOs)" after an occasion when the colonel's office window was broken by a ball kicked by an SNCO's son playing outside. The RMACC was the first cadet corps in the Royal Navy (the Sea Cadet Corps not being recognised by the Admiralty until 1919).

The RMACC was initially formed with the motto 'Manners Maketh Man', and re-titled as the Royal Marines Volunteer Cadet Corps in the mid-20th century (sometimes also known as the RM Volunteer Boys Corps). Royal Marines Girl Cadet Corps (also known as the Royal Marines Volunteer Girls Corps) and the Girl Ambulance Corps units existed alongside RMVBC units for some time, and these were merged with the RMVBC after the Second World War, with the current title being adopted by all units in the 1970s. However, Portsmouth Division RMVCC only accepted girls from the mid-1990s. The RMVCC is also the first military cadet organisation to be titled 'Royal'; indeed, its cadets were 'Royal Marines Cadets' from the date of the organisation's formation (the Marine Cadets of the SCC and CCF have only recently been given this distinction).

Since 1901, units were formed at:

- Portsmouth Division RMVCC: originally at Eastney Barracks, then HMS Nelson but now at HMS Excellent in Portsmouth.
- Chatham Division RMVCC: Royal Marine Barracks, Chatham (now part of the Sea Cadet Corps).
- Deal Division RMVCC: Royal Marines School of Music in Deal, Kent.
- Gosport Division RMVCC: Forton Barracks, Gosport (now based at HMS Sultan).
- Plymouth Division RMVCC: RM Stonehouse in Plymouth.
- Lympstone Division RMVCC: Commando Training Centre Royal Marines, Lympstone, near Exeter in Devon.
- Arbroath Division RMVCC: RM Condor in Arbroath in Angus, Scotland.
- Chivenor Division RMVCC: RM Chivenor near Barnstaple in Devon (new in December 2020).
- Band of the RMVCC Plymouth: RM Stonehouse in Plymouth.
- Band of the RMVCC Gosport: HMS Sultan in Gosport, Hampshire.

Deal Division RMVCC closed when the Royal Marines School of Music left the town and moved to HMNB Portsmouth; Chatham Division RMVCC transferred to the Sea Cadet Corps when Pay & Records Royal Marines left Chatham in the 1960s, and Gosport Division RMVCC was disbanded and then re-formed as a non-MOD cadet marching band in the 1970s following the traditions of the Royal Marines Light Infantry but closed again in 2006. However, Gosport Division RMVCC was stood up again in HMS Sultan in 2018.

Cadets from the RMVCC have appeared at Navy Days in Portsmouth and Plymouth, the Royal Tournament and in the 1955 film The Cockleshell Heroes. As of the 6 July 2014, following a tri-partite RMC parade at Buckingham Palace in the presence of the Duke of Edinburgh (Captain General Royal Marines) and in celebration of the 350th anniversary of the formation of the Royal Marines, all marine cadets in the UK can be titled as Royal Marines Cadets.

The RMVCC were casualties in the 1951 Gillingham bus disaster when 24 RM Cadets were killed on a foggy December evening whilst marching to watch a boxing tournament.

== Cadet Ranks ==
Boys and girls enter as a Recruit, and having 'passed out' at the end of their basic training become a cadet. Cadets follow the VCC Training Syllabus and progress through 'phases', similar to how the Army Cadets achieve stars. Command Courses allow the cadets to progress up through the ranks:

Royal Marine Volunteer Cadet Corps							No insignia	No insignia
Royal Marine Volunteer Cadet Corps	Cadet warrant officer first class	Cadet warrant officer second class	Cadet colour sergeant	Cadet sergeant	Cadet corporal	Cadet lance corporal	Cadet	Recruit
Royal Marine Volunteer Cadet Corps	CDTWO1	CDTWO2	CDTCSGT	CDTSGT	CDTCPL	CDTLCPL	CDT	RCT

== See also ==
- Volunteer Cadet Corps
- Community Cadet Forces

=== Other Marines Cadets ===
- Royal Marines Section Combined Cadet Force
- Royal Marines Cadets (Sea Cadet Corps)
- Young Marines
