= HMS St Vincent (Gosport shore establishment) =

Coordinates: 50.7997°N 1.1359°W

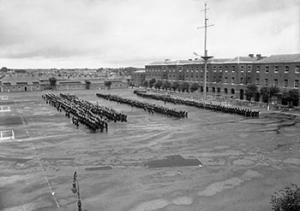
- Pilots and observers of the Fleet Air Arm on the parade ground of HMS St Vincent in 1943

History

United Kingdom
- Name: HMS St Vincent
- Commissioned: 1 June 1927
- Decommissioned: 2 April 1969
- Fate: Decommissioned and duties dispersed to other establishments

General characteristics
- Class & type: Stone frigate

HMS St Vincent was a shore establishment of the Royal Navy, located in Gosport, Hampshire.

The name was given to the Forton Barracks site in Gosport in 1927, after the one that been set up aboard the old first rate HMS St Vincent in 1862. The new HMS St Vincent was commissioned on 1 June 1927, originally like its predecessor as a training establishment for boys and juniors. On the outbreak of the Second World War, the boys were evacuated to the Isle of Man, where they merged with those evacuated from HMS Caledonia to form HMS St George, which was formally established in 1939. HMS St Vincent meanwhile became a training establishment for officers of the Fleet Air Arm and an overflow for the Royal Navy barracks. A signal school was also established. A torpedo training section was opened on 22 July 1940.

St Vincent reverted to being a boy's training establishment after the end of the war, and reopened as such on 1 December 1945. It continued to function as such until 1968, when it was decided to close St Vincent. The official closing ceremony was held on 8 December 1968, with the White Ensign being lowered for the last time on 2 April 1969. The base was then handed over to the land agent the following day, 3 April 1969.

St Vincent College now stands on the site.

== Publications ==
- Warlow, Ben, Shore Establishments of the Royal Navy, Liskeard : Maritime, 2000. ISBN 978-0-907771-73-9
- Cushley, John "www.hmsstvincentassociation.com"
