= St Vincent College =

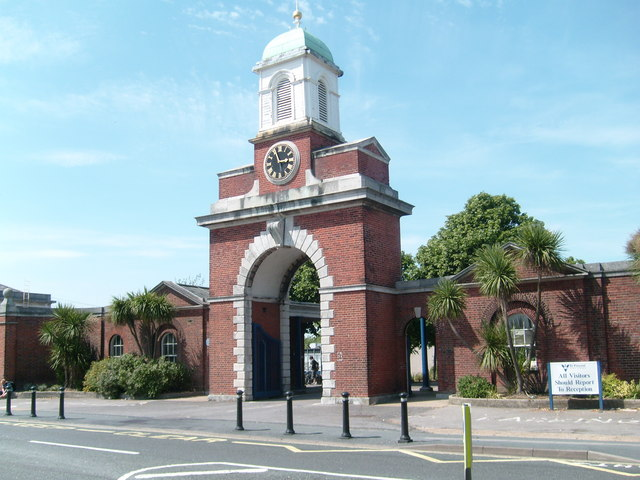

Location
- Mill Lane; Gosport, Hampshire, PO12 4QA; England; 50.800°N 1.136°W

Information
- Type: Sixth Form College
- Established: 1987; 39 years ago
- Local authority: Hampshire County Council
- Department for Education URN: 145229 Tables
- Ofsted: Reports
- Principal: Andy Grant
- Gender: Mixed
- Age: 16 to 18
- Enrolment: 700
- Publication: Clocktower
- Website: www.stvincent.ac.uk

St Vincent College is a co-educational sixth form (16–18) college located in Gosport, Hampshire, England. The majority of students come from the surrounding towns including Gosport, Fareham, Stubbington and Winchester. The nearby Gosport Ferry link with Portsmouth also allows students from that city to attend.

In December 2023 there were around 700 students aged 16–18 studying at the college. The college caters for students with high needs and also adult learners. It is part of the Lighthouse Learning Trust.

== History ==
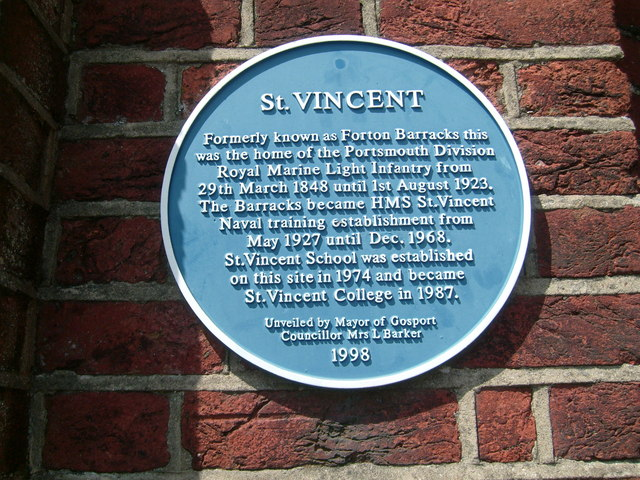
Blue plaque

St Vincent Secondary School opened in 1975 on the site of Forton Barracks, known after 1927 as HMS St. Vincent, with most of the historic buildings of its former Naval existence having been subsequently demolished. In 1987 Gosport Sixth Form College opened as part of the re-organisation of secondary education in the town. Initially the college shared the site with St Vincent Secondary School, but when the school's final Year 11 left in 1990, the present title was adopted.

There is a small museum on the site that has a number of artefacts and pictures of the site's time as a naval establishment, although it opens only on the last Friday of each month during term time.

== Sports ==
The college is represented by a hockey team, football team, netball team and an ultimate frisbee team named Thundercatch. Sports facilities include a full-sized Astro turf-based pitch. The campus hosts a gym for the use of the students and local community.

== Proposed merger with Fareham College ==
It was announced in November 2008 in the local press that St Vincent will remain an independent sixth form college. The Gosport community and Principal, staff and students of the college fought hard to keep the college open. The initial Learning and Skills Council (LSC - Government Quango) proposal was on the basis of a consensual merger between the two institutions. Merger talks broke down in the late summer of 2007 when significant differences of opinion over the suitability of the former HMS Daedalus site for a £40 million 'super college' for the Gosport and Fareham area emerged. Consequently, St Vincent pulled out of the proposed merger, but the local LSC decided to pursue a forced merger between the two colleges. St Vincent fought a high-profile local and national campaign to fight this. By the early summer of 2008 it became apparent that the LSC did not have the necessary powers required to secure a forced merger and the plan was scrapped in the autumn. In November 2008 both colleges were inspected by Ofsted and each was given an overall 'good' grade.

== See also ==
- Richard Taunton Sixth Form College, part of the same trust
