= Eastney Barracks =

Military building in Hampshire, England

Eastney Barracks
- Eastney, Hampshire
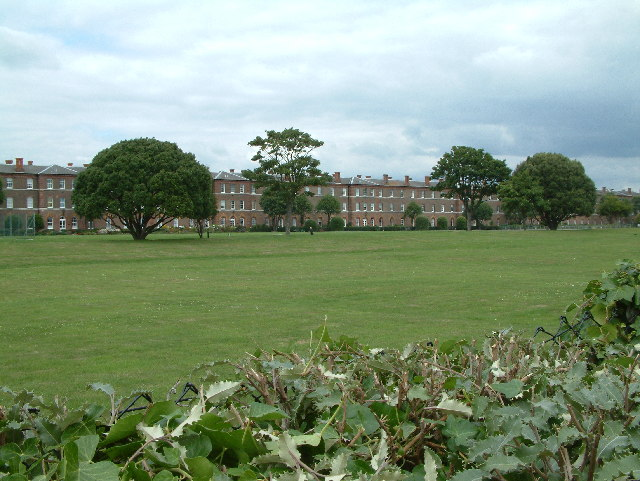
- Gunners Row - the former barracks

Site information
- Type: Royal Marines Base

Location
- Location within Hampshire
- Coordinates: 50.7855°N 1.0547°W

Site history
- Built: 1867
- Built for: Admiralty
- In use: 1867-1995

Garrison information
- Occupants: Portsmouth Division, Royal Marines

Eastney Barracks was a military installation occupied by the Royal Marines and located at Eastney near Portsmouth.

== History ==
Eastney Barracks, designed by William Scamp (assistant director, Admiralty Works Department), was built as headquarters for the Royal Marine Artillery, who moved in from Fort Cumberland in 1867. After the amalgamation of the Royal Marine Light Infantry and Royal Marine Artillery in 1923, Forton Barracks was closed and Eastney Barracks served as headquarters for the Portsmouth Division of the Corps. The series of seven linked blocks facing the sea forms the second longest barracks frontage in the country (after the Royal Artillery Barracks, Woolwich). The ensemble has been called "the best and most complete barracks of the post-Crimean War period". Eastney Barracks remained the Corps Headquarters until 1995, when it was sold and converted to private housing.

The Royal Marines Museum, established there in 1958, was accommodated in the former officers' mess at Eastney Barracks from 1972 to 2017. Having deemed the building 'unsuitable' the National Museum of the Royal Navy put the collections into storage, and in December 2020 the former officers' mess was sold to Grand Hotel Excelsior International for conversion into a "luxury hotel".

== Cadets ==
The first cadets established by the Admiralty (now the Royal Navy) were started at Eastney Barracks on 14 February 1901. The Royal Marines Artillery Cadet Corps was set up to gainfully occupy the spare time of Royal Marines Artillery men's sons, with entry later widened to all services and then civilian children. The RMACC eventually became the Royal Marines Volunteer Boy Corps and then, from the 1980s, the Royal Marines Volunteer Cadet Corps, part of the Royal Navy's Volunteer Cadet Corps. The VCC vacated Eastney Barracks in 1991 and moved to HMS Nelson in Portsmouth. It is now based at HMS Excellent.

== Local folklore and legend ==
The Barracks are reportedly home to two ghosts. One is a young girl, seen around the main steps to the entry, who according to local legend was crushed to death when she ran in front of a horse-drawn carriage. The other is the smell of burning and a depressing atmosphere, experienced by staff in the attic, which has been linked to the local legend of a 19th-century officer called Colonel Wolf who burnt his love letters and shot himself there after the end of a love affair. It was therefore the location for an episode of the Antix Productions series Most Haunted Live! broadcast on 7 May 2006 as part of its Panic In Portsmouth strand, which included episodes from Wymering Manor and Southsea Castle.

== Gallery ==
=== Listed buildings ===
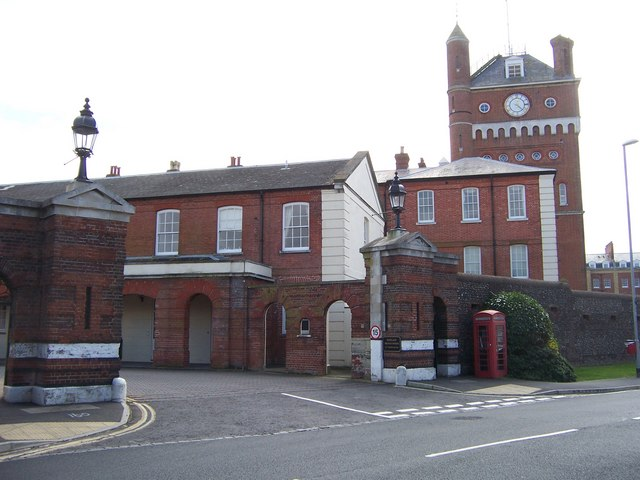
Main gate, guardroom, offices and clock tower

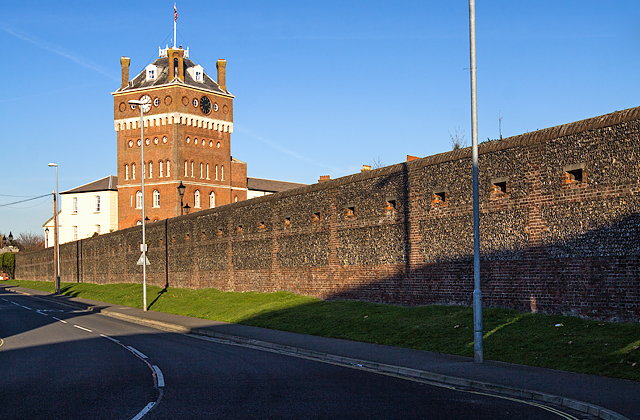
Part of the boundary wall

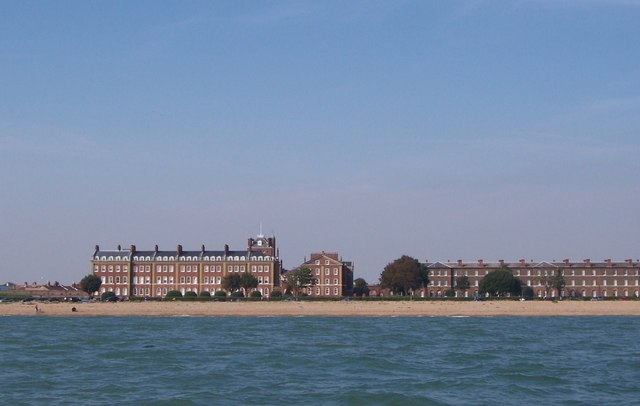
Officers' quarters: Eastney House and Terrace (left)

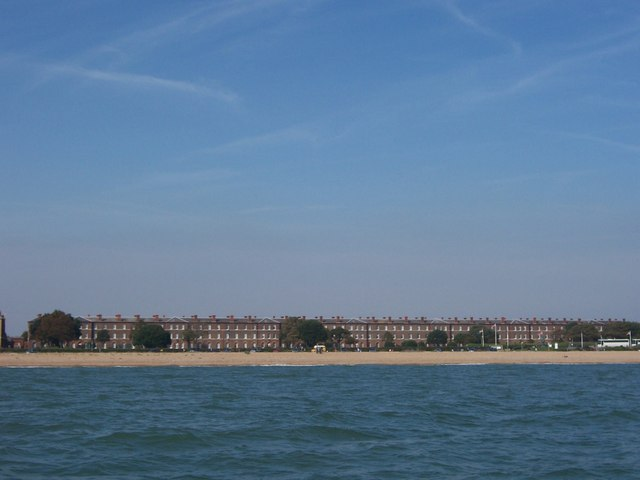
The Long Barracks

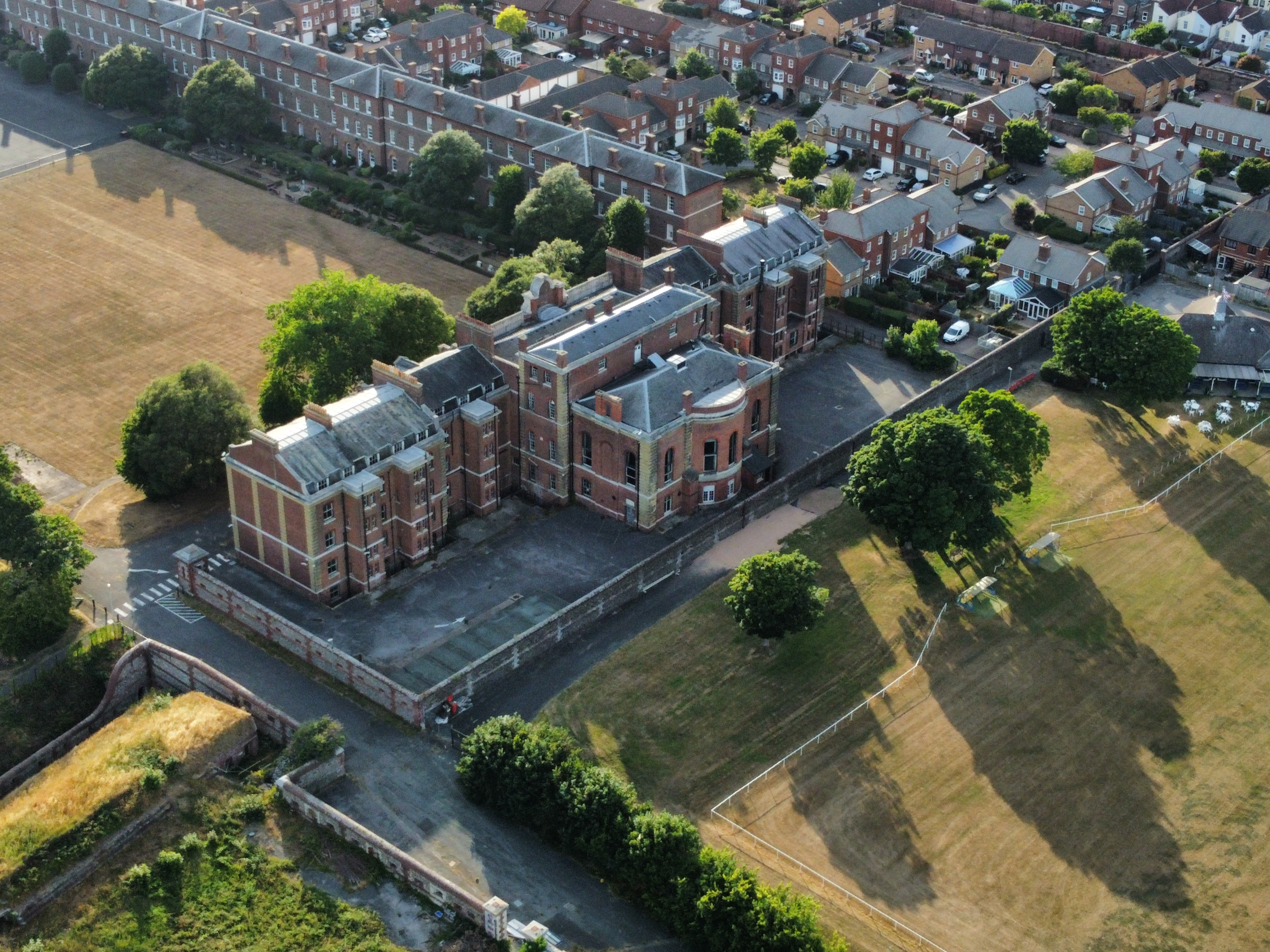
The Officers' Mess

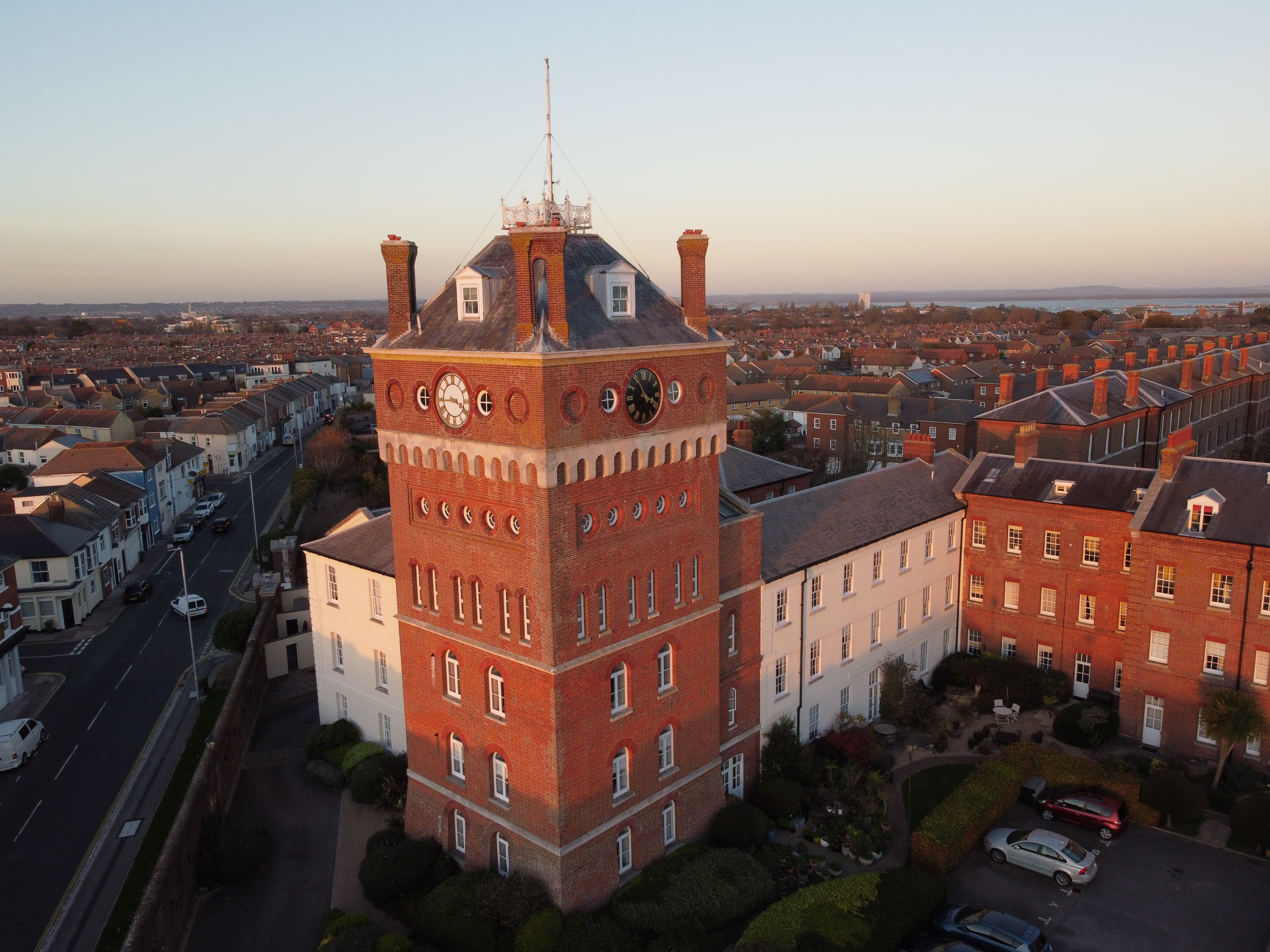
Former Clocktower

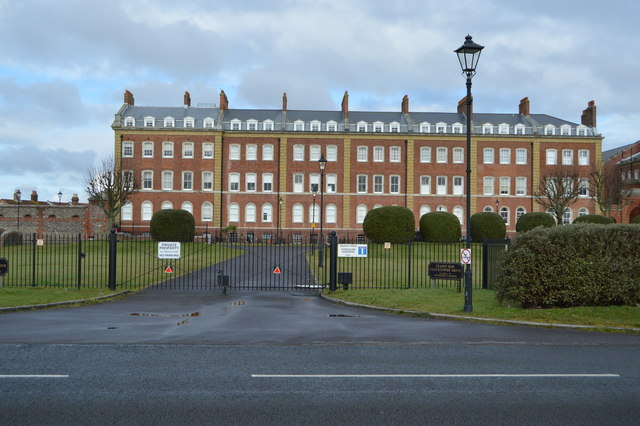
Former Eastney House

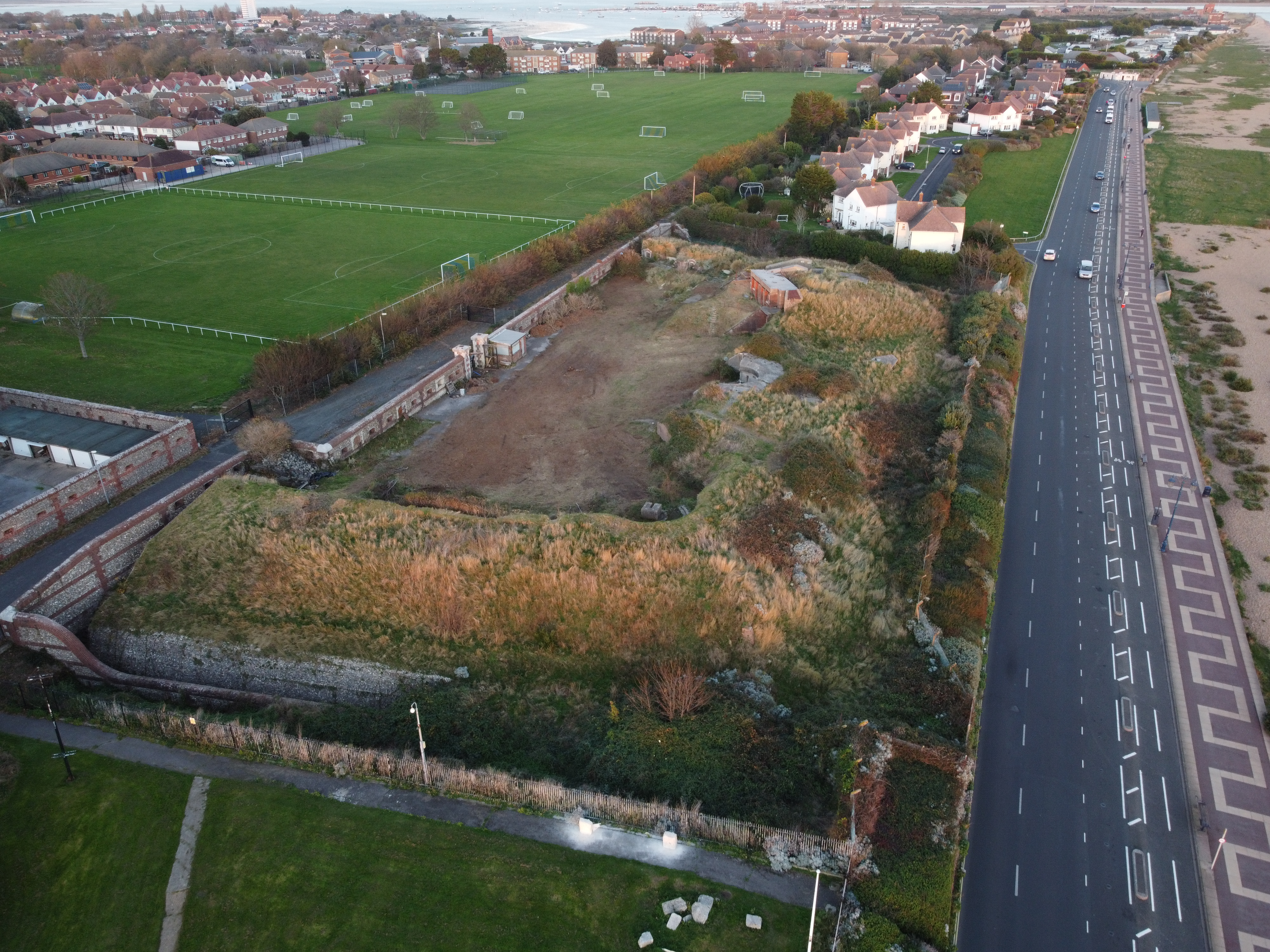
Eastney Fort East

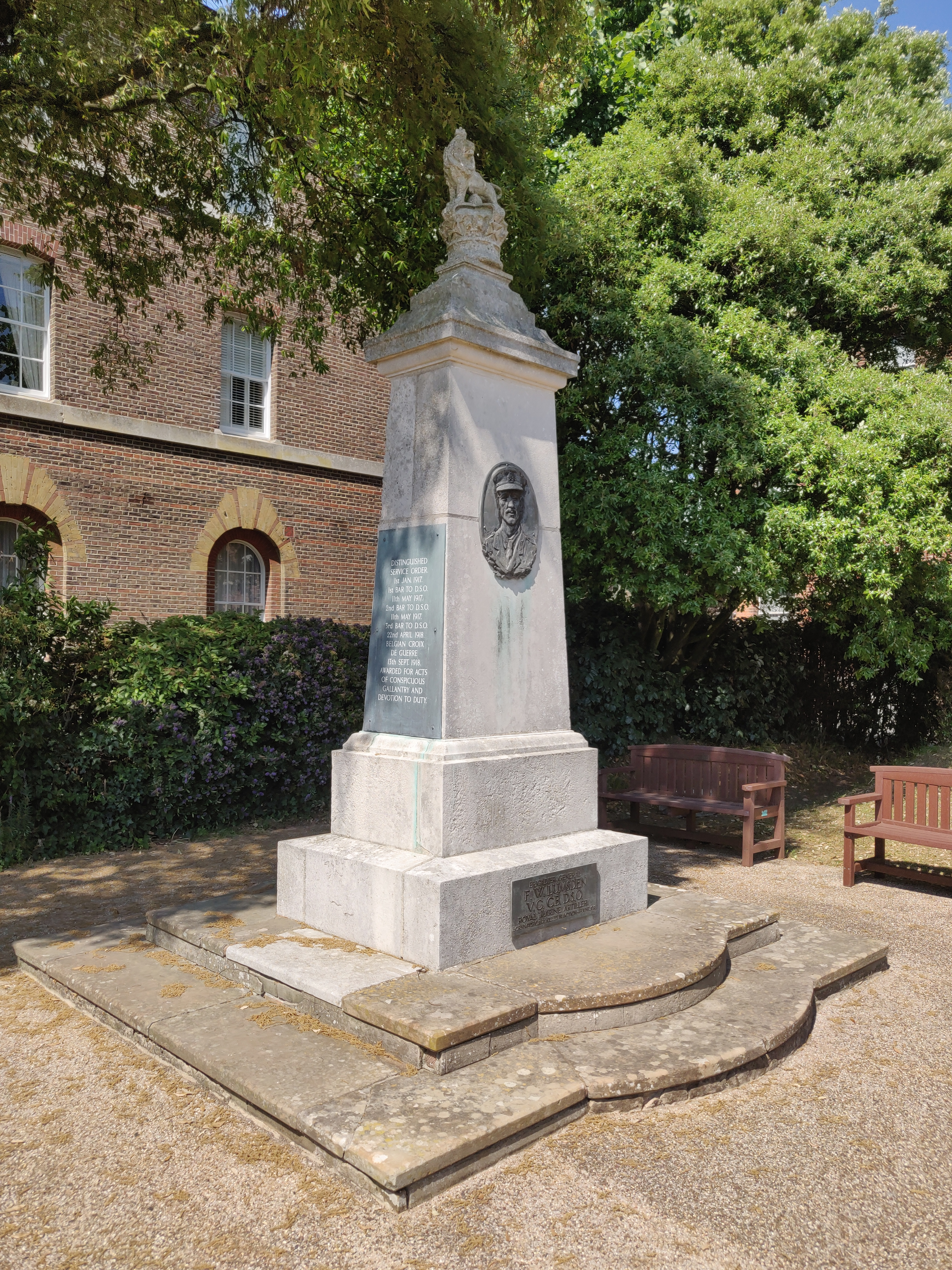
Lumsden Memorial

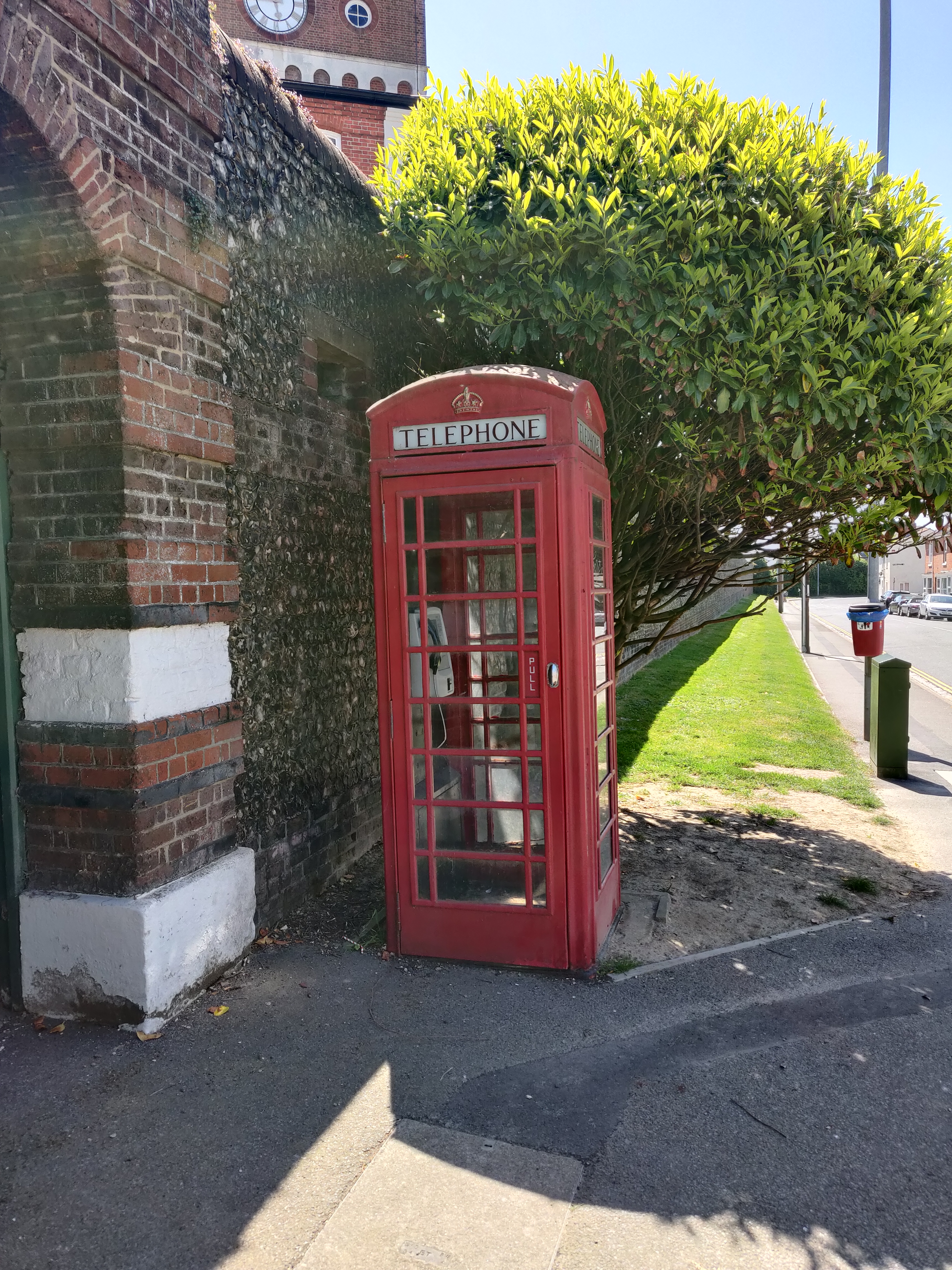
K6 telephone kiosk

=== Other structures ===
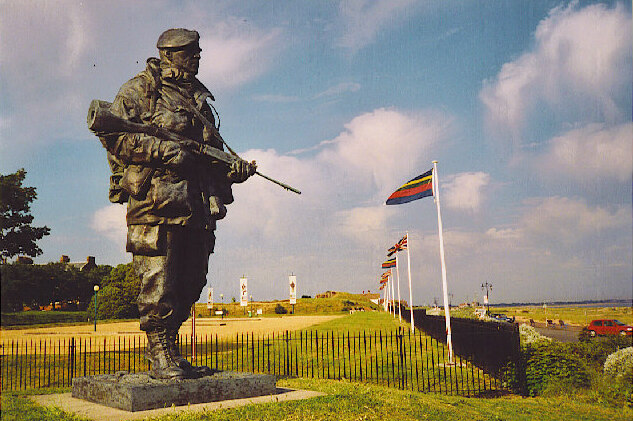
The Yomper statue

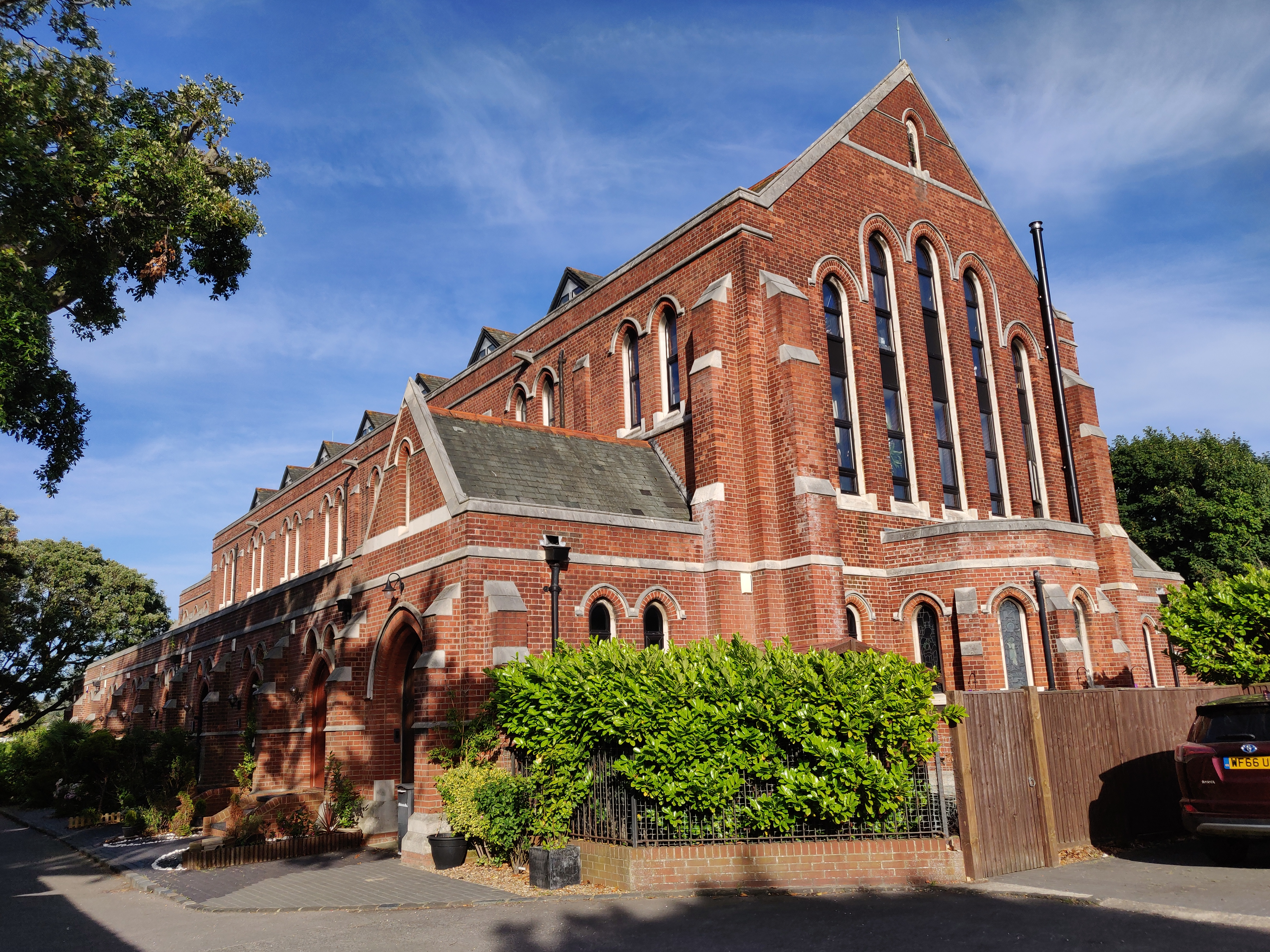
St Andrew's (the Royal Marine Artillery Church)

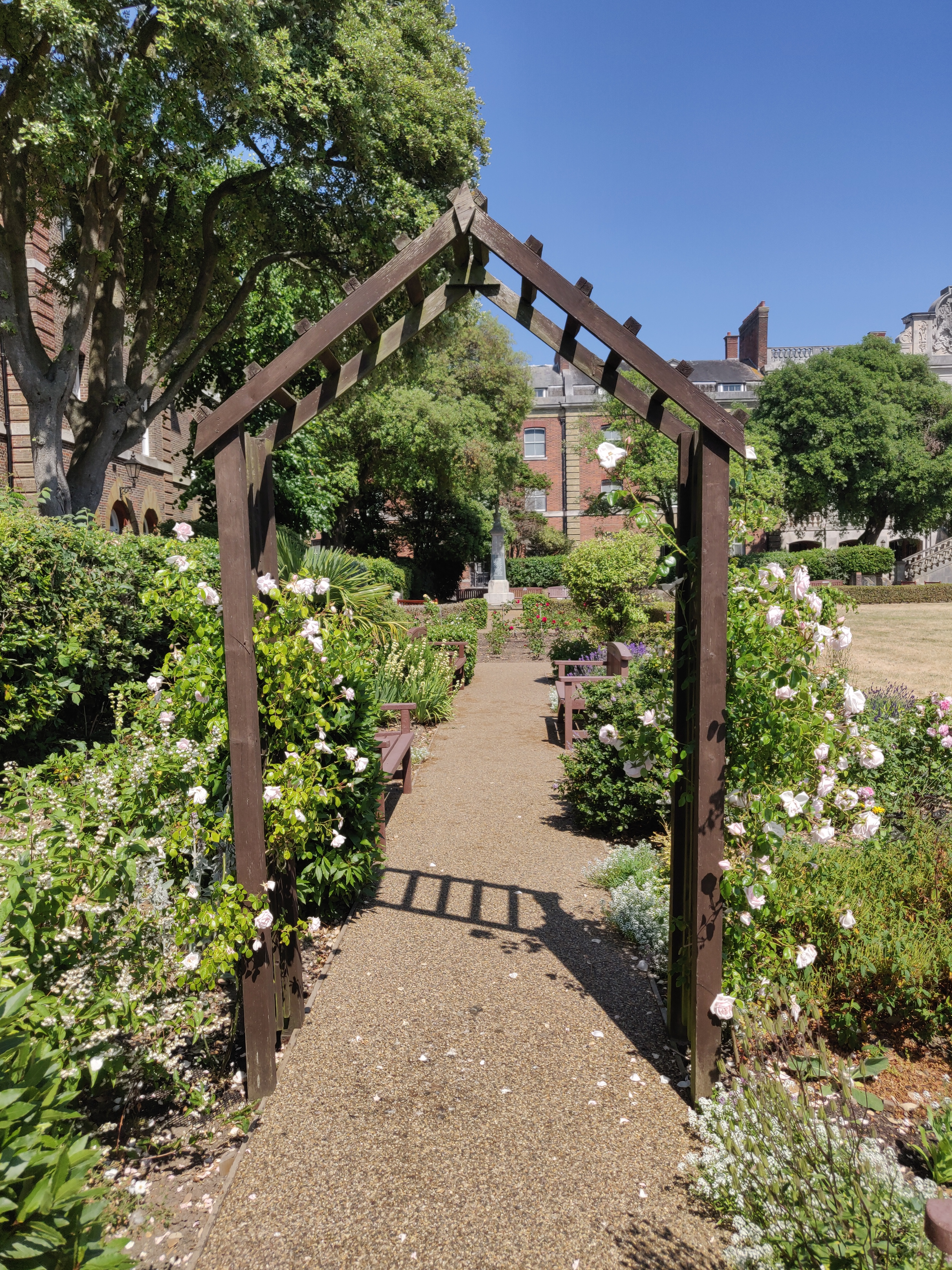
Royal Marines Memorial Garden

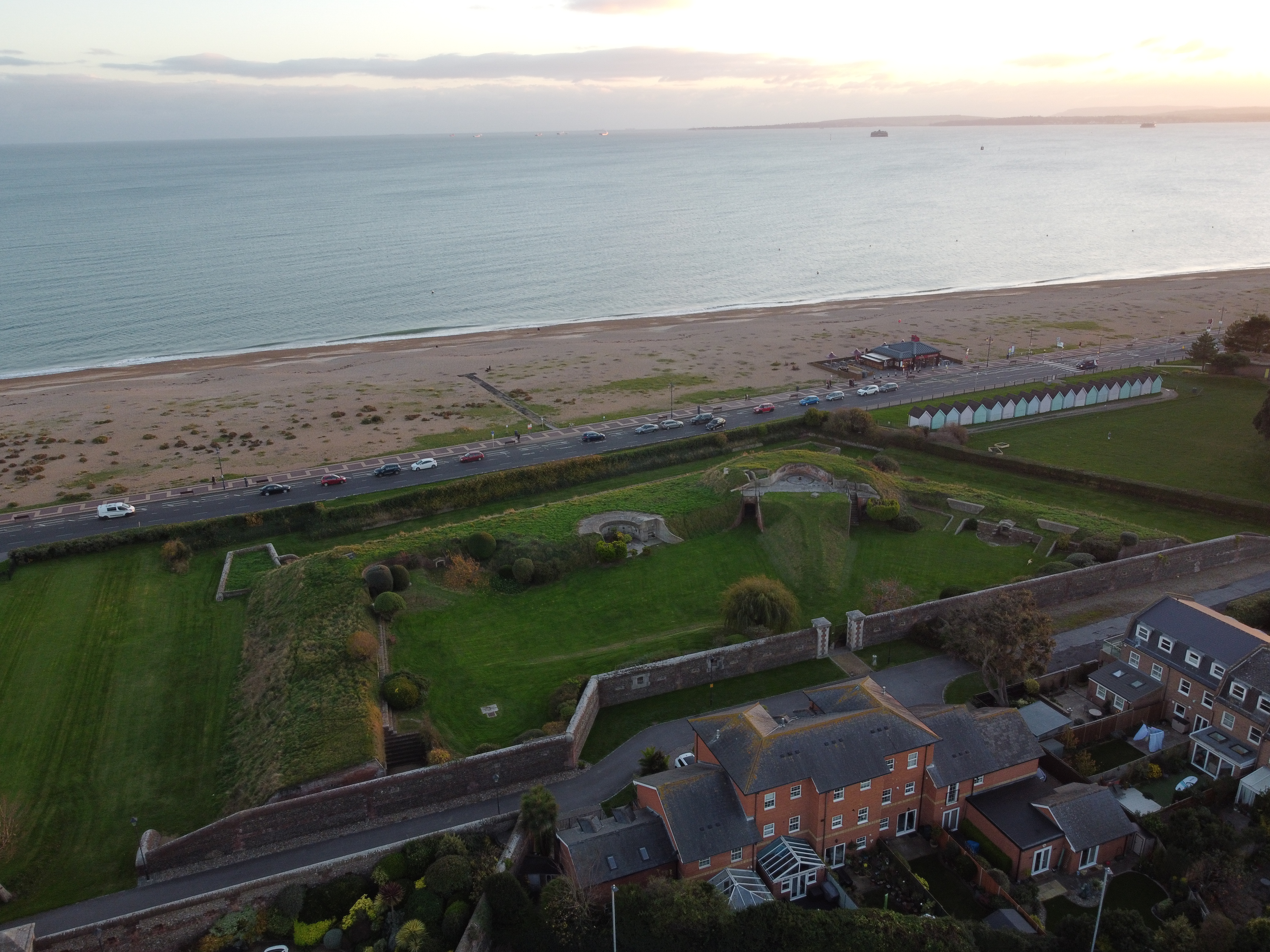
Eastney Fort West

== Publications ==
- Ambler, John and Little, Matthew, 2008. Sea Soldiers of Portsmouth. A pictorial History of the Royal Marines at Eastney and Fort Cumberland, Halsgrove, Somerset, ISBN 978-1841147437
- Lane, Andrew, 1998. The Royal Marines Barracks Eastney. A pictorial history, Halsgrove Publishing, ISBN 1874448922
