= Gillingham bus disaster =

1951 road accident in Kent, England

Coordinates: 51°23′43″N 0°31′54″E

1951 Gillingham bus disaster
- Royal Marines Volunteer Cadet Corps

Details
- Date: 4 December 1951
- Location: Gillingham, Kent
- Incident type: Bus-pedestrian crash
- Cause: Poor lighting.

Statistics
- Deaths: 24
- Injured: 18

The Gillingham bus disaster occurred outside Chatham Dockyard, Kent, England, on the evening of 4 December 1951. A double-decker bus ploughed into a company of fifty-two young members of the Royal Marines Volunteer Cadet Corps, aged between nine and thirteen. Twenty-four of the cadets were killed and eighteen injured; at the time it was the highest loss of life in any road accident in British history, until it was surpassed by the 1975 Dibbles Bridge coach crash which killed 33.

== Accident ==
The company was marching from Melville Barracks to the Royal Naval Barracks, Chatham, to attend a boxing tournament. It was divided into three platoons; the rear platoon consisted of new recruits who had not yet received uniforms. They were generally under the command of cadet non-commissioned officers (NCOs); the only adult present was the contingent adjutant, Lieutenant Clarence Murrayfield Carter, a regular Royal Marines officer. The column was about fifteen yards long and was marching three abreast on the left-hand side of the road. It was showing no lights, there being no official requirement to do so, and the boys in uniform were wearing Royal Marines standard-issue dark blue battledress and berets, although they had white belts and white lanyards on their shoulders.

The cadets left Melville Barracks at about 5.40 pm. At about 5.57 or 5.58 pm the column was marching down Dock Road, just past the gates of the Chatham Royal Naval Dockyard. The street lighting was very poor and it was allegedly a very dark/foggy night (although Carter denied this).

As the column passed the municipal swimming pool, a particularly dark part of the street (since a street lamp had failed), it was hit from behind by a bus belonging to the Chatham & District Traction Company. The bus was allegedly travelling at 15–20 mph (25–30 km/h), although Carter and another witness estimated its speed as 40–45 mph (65–70 km/h). The bus driver, John William George Samson, 57, had worked for the company for forty years, twenty-five of them as a driver. He was very familiar with the route. He had his sidelights on, but not his headlights; this was perfectly legal and considered to be normal practice at the time. Other bus drivers said that they were using headlights that night and in that location as it was particularly dark. Other drivers defended Samson's decision not to use his headlights.

Lieutenant Carter, who was moving up and down the flanks of the column, told the inquest that he saw the bus coming and told the boys to move into the kerb as far as they could, assuming the bus would move around them. Samson told the inquest that he did not see the cadets at all and was only aware he had driven into something when the bus started to wobble as though it "had run over a lot of loose stones or something", although it was also reported that he felt bumps and heard the high-pitched screams of the cadets. At that point he braked immediately. His conductress, Dorothy Dunster, called out "What's happened?", and Samson got out to see what had happened. Carter, who was knocked over and dazed but not injured, said the bus continued about fifty yards before braking and another witness said he thought about twenty-five yards. Once the bus had come to a stop, Carter raced to the front where he found driver John Samson having exited the bus, pale-faced after having seen just what he had hit, repeating over and over, "I didn't see them, I didn't see them!". When the stricken cadets began screaming in pain, he fell to the ground and shouted "My God, what've I done?!"

== Victims ==
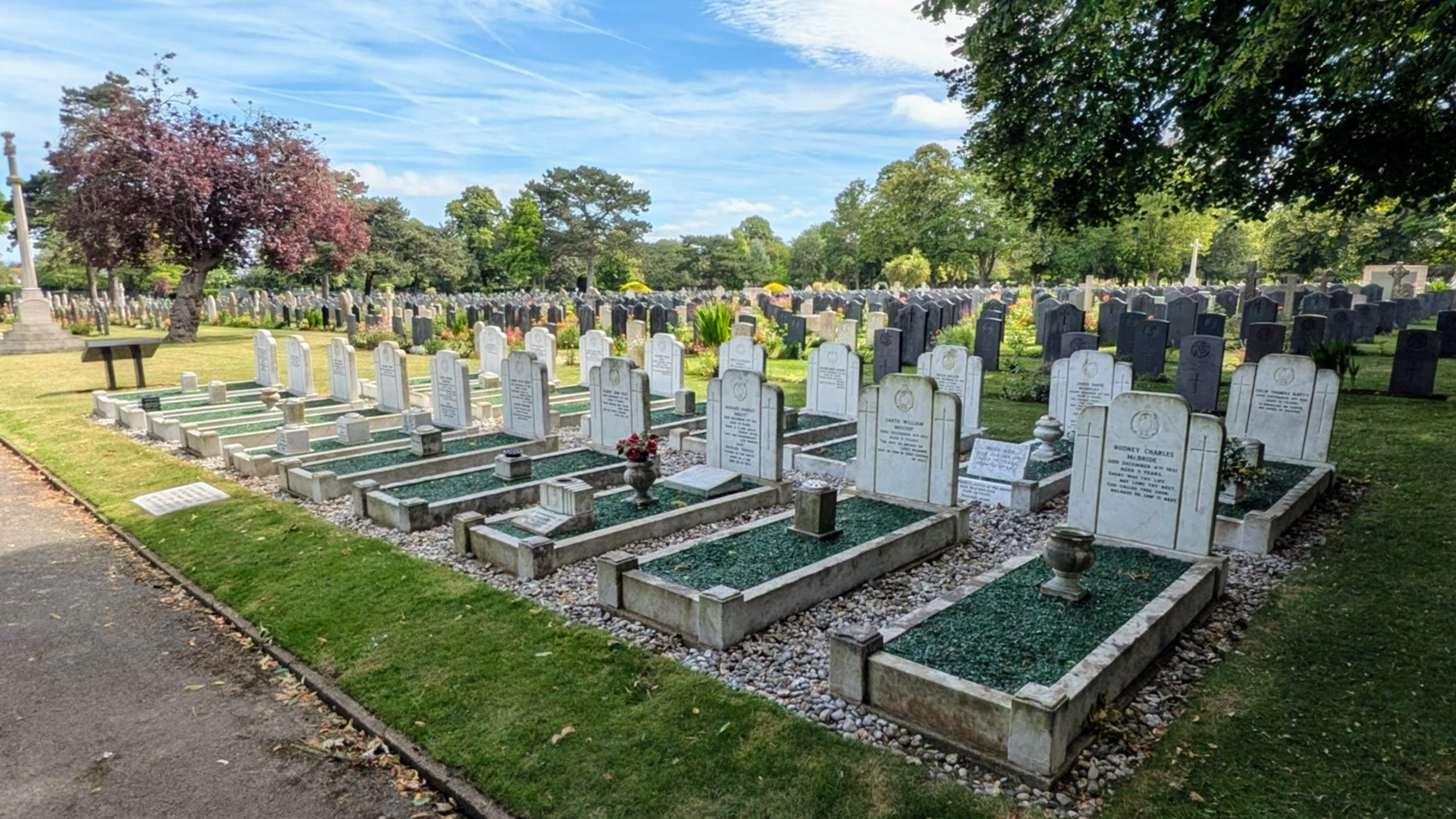
Cadet graves at Gillingham Cemetery

Seventeen boys died immediately and another seven died later in hospital, all but one on the same night. Those who were uninjured were all in the front ranks. The military funeral of twenty of the boys who died was held at Rochester Cathedral on 12 December 1951 and conducted by the Bishop of Rochester. Thousands of local people stood outside the cathedral and lined the route of the funeral procession to Gillingham Cemetery. Royal Marines guarded the coffins and acted as pall bearers and the ceremony was attended by, among others, the Second Sea Lord, the Commandant-General Royal Marines, and the Parliamentary and Financial Secretary of the Admiralty. Three of the boys who were Roman Catholics had a separate funeral at the Church of Our Lady, Gillingham, conducted by the Bishop of Southwark Cyril Cowderoy.

The parents of the boys who died received a total of £10,000 compensation (equivalent to £273,153 in 2025) from the bus company, which accepted liability under the tort of negligence.

== Investigation ==
An inquest was held on 14 December 1951 at the Royal Naval Hospital in Gillingham, where many of the injured were being treated, before the North-East Kent Coroner. The jury returned a verdict of accidental death. The coroner said that he believed that Lieutenant Carter and the other witness, George Thomas Dixon, were probably mistaken about the speed of the bus and accepted Samson's estimate of his speed. He did not believe that either Carter or Samson had been negligent in legal terms.

Despite the coroner's comments, Samson was charged with dangerous driving. He was found guilty at the Central Criminal Court, but with a recommendation of leniency from the jury, as it was clear that other factors had played a role in the accident. The judge banned him from driving for three years and fined him £20 (equivalent to £546 in 2025), but he avoided imprisonment, as the judge stated that the mental punishment which Samson was now living with would far exceed anything applied by law.

== Aftermath ==
The accident resulted in improved street lighting in the Medway Towns and the decision of all three services that a red light would henceforward be shown at the rear of all columns marching along roads at night. Photographs taken by the police at the time showed the street to be lit by lamp standards which were typical in the country at the time and they were all (or almost all) in perfect working order. It has also been stated in official reports that the grim circumstances of the accident were particularly harrowing, given that several injured cadets were trapped under the bus and could not be extricated due to problems lifting the bus, which would have put additional weight on trapped survivors. The subsequent Ministry enquiry recommended that all UK buses should be fitted with a single kerb spot light and this recommendation was accepted. Although largely forgotten now this was probably the UK's second worst traffic accident ever if death and injuries are the only criteria. The Dibbles Bridge coach crash in 1975 left 33 dead and many more injured.

The mayors of Gillingham, Rochester and Chatham set up a memorial fund, inviting public donations through the local and national press "to be devoted, among other things, to defraying the funeral expenses, caring for the boys who may be disabled, and then to such worthy cause or causes in memory of the boys who lost their lives, as the mayors may determine". Donations of nearly £9,000 were received. Over £2,300 was spent, but the mayors could not decide how to apply the balance of the funds. A court case later decided that the fund was not charitable and was not saved by the Charitable Trusts (Validation) Act 1954; that the cy-près doctrine could not be applied; that the fund's objects were too uncertain for it to be a valid trust; that the fund was not bona vacantia; and as a result that the funds should be returned to the donors under a resulting trust. Every year on the Sunday closest to the event, the Chatham Royal Marine Cadet Unit still holds a memorial parade at the cemetery in which the cadets were laid to rest.

Driver John Samson never drove again. He continued living in the local area, but was a broken man. Up until his death, he largely kept to himself and never spoke publicly about what had happened. The bus involved, a Bristol double-decker registered as GKE 69, remained in service for two more years before it was finally scrapped in 1953. Reportedly, the drivers were glad to see it gone as they strongly disliked driving it or seeing it around after the accident.

== References in fiction ==
In the film Shadowlands, which is set in the 1950s, C. S. Lewis (played by Anthony Hopkins) refers to the Gillingham bus disaster in a lecture on theology as a conspicuous example of terrible and tragic events which happen in the world and which God "allows to happen", and then goes on to explain his opinion on why God behaves that way.
