= Cadets (youth program) =

Military fitness programs for the youth

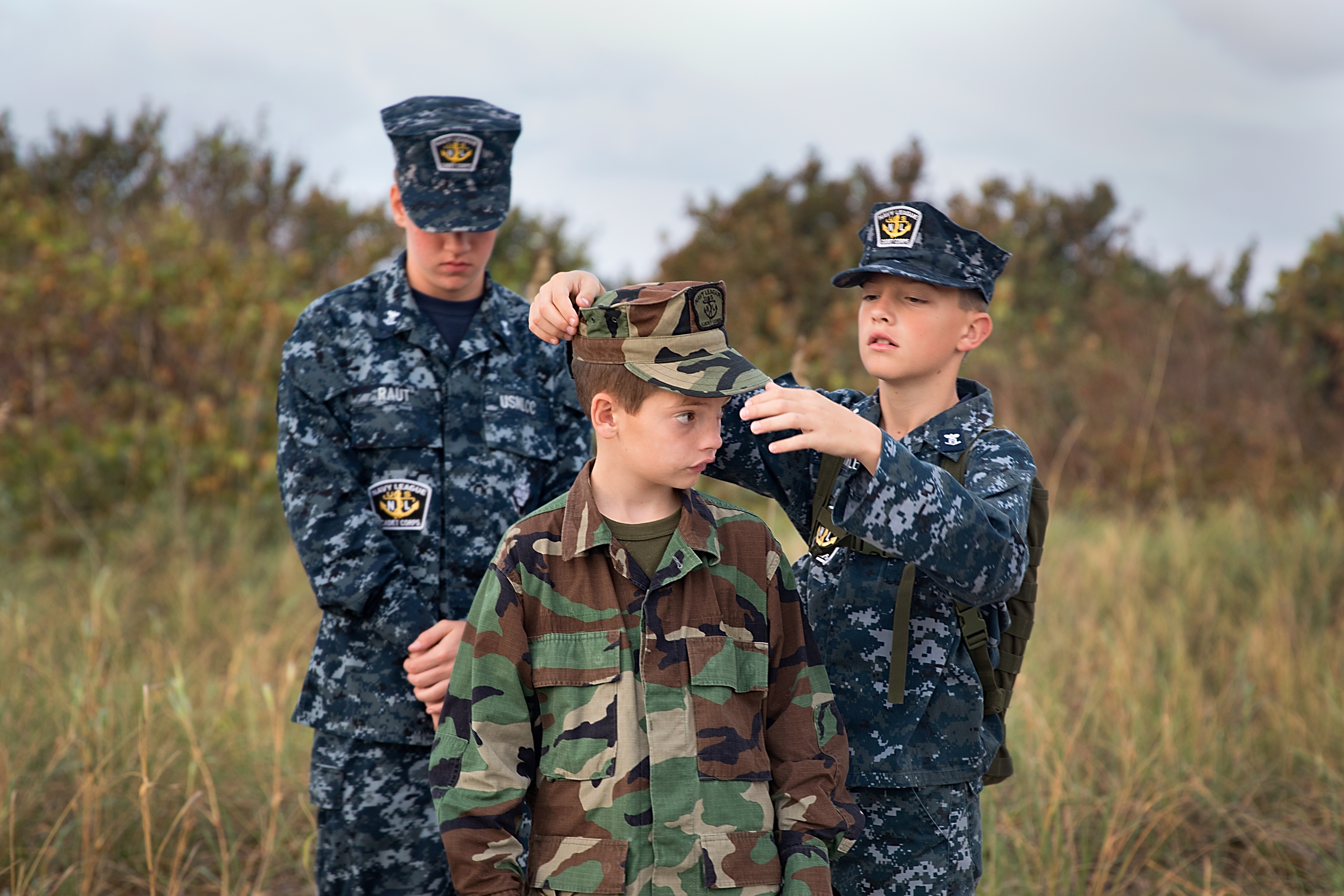
A United States Naval Sea Cadet assists another cadet in putting on a field cap.

Cadets or cadet corps are voluntary youth programs sponsored by a national military service or ministry of defence. These programs are aimed to provide youths with activities associated with military or paramilitary training, including drills, physical fitness, and education. Although these youth organisations are modelled after their sponsoring military service, they do not form a part of these services nor do they constitute a military service in their own right.

Several civilian organisations, including civil defence, police services, and emergency medical services like St John Ambulance, may also operate or sponsor their own "cadet" youth programs.

== Antigua and Barbuda ==
The Antigua and Barbuda Cadet Corps consists of students between the ages of 12 and 19. It Is a voluntary youth organisation, sponsored by the government of Antigua & Barbuda. The main objective is to provide training and personal development to the youths through paramilitary activities and also embrace community activities. The cadet corps has 200 members and falls under the direct command of a regular officer of the Antigua and Barbuda Defence Force. There are two categories in the Cadet Corps, Sea Cadets and Infantry Cadets.

== Australia ==
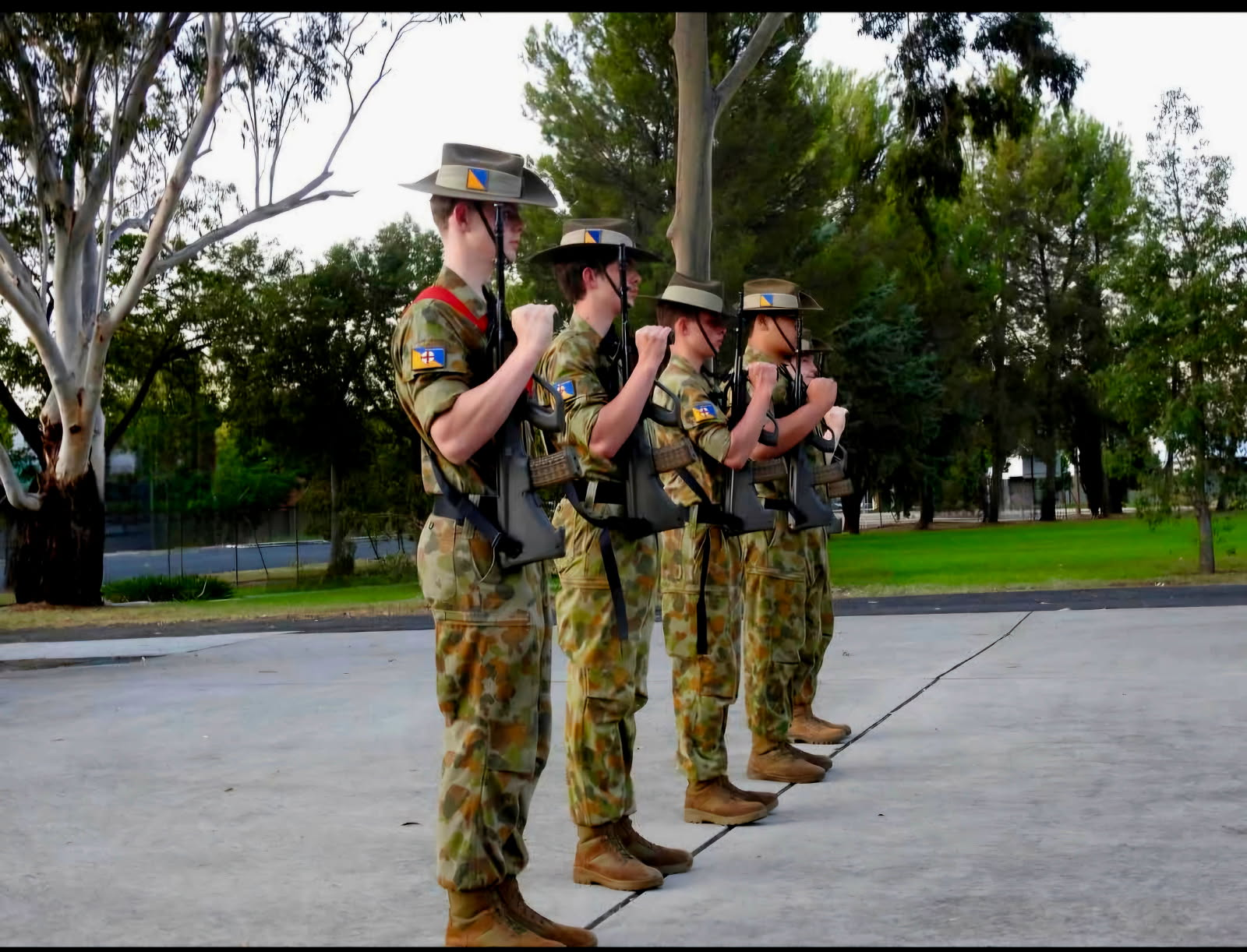
Australian Army Cadets from 2/19 ACU Wagga Wagga performing a Present Arms with the EF88

The Australian Defence Force Cadets (ADFC) is the Australian Defence Force–sponsored youth program, and is made up of the Australian Army Cadets, Australian Navy Cadets, and Australian Air Force Cadets. The ADFC is funded by the Australian Government via the Department of Defence.

Other cadet movements include the St John Ambulance Australia Cadets, and the South Australian Country Fire Service Cadets. The longest-running cadet corps in Australia is The King's School Cadet Corps.

== Bangladesh ==
The Bangladesh National Cadet Corps, under the dual administration of the ministries of defence and education, promotes youth development movement in Bangladesh. During the Bangladesh Liberation War, cadets of this organisation played an important role as freedom fighters, with several casualties.

== Canada ==
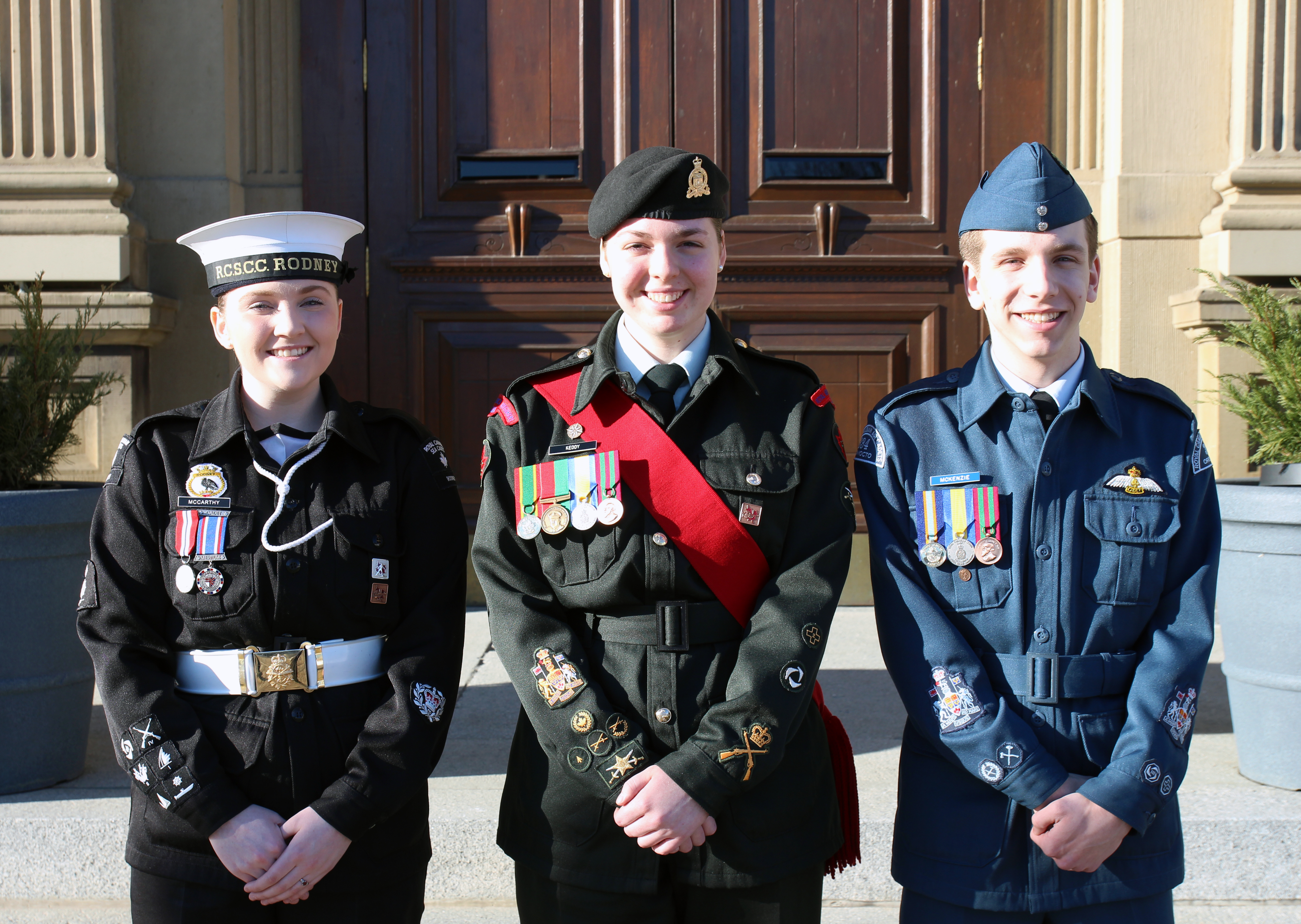
Cadets from the Royal Canadian Sea Cadets, Royal Canadian Army Cadets and the Royal Canadian Air Cadets

The Canadian Cadets Organisation is Canada's oldest and largest youth organisation, with over 57,000 participants spread out into over 1200 Cadet Corps and Squadrons in 2024. The Canadian Cadets Organisation is made up of three youth groups, the Royal Canadian Air Cadets, the Royal Canadian Army Cadets, and the Royal Canadian Sea Cadets, and is open to youths aged 12 to 18. The program is administered by the Department of National Defence (DND) and is sponsored by the Canadian Forces. However, cadets are not members of the Canadian Armed Forces and are not expected to join it. Funding for these organisations is provided through the DND in partnership with the Army Cadet, Air Cadet, and Navy Leagues of Canada. The Royal Canadian Mounted Police maintains a similar youth program in partnership with Scouts Canada called the RCMP Rovers and Ventures.

== Ghana ==
The National Cadet Corps of Ghana is an amalgamation of the former Army, Navy, Air Force, Police and Fire Cadets programs in Ghana. It was established in 2002 under the Ministry of Education, presently Ministry of Youth and Sports.

== Hong Kong ==
Cadet corps are linked to Hong Kong colonial past including the Hong Kong Sea Cadet Corps, Hong Kong Adventure Corps, Hong Kong Air Cadet Corps and Hong Kong Army Cadets Association Limited. They are now funded by the Hong Kong government.

== India ==
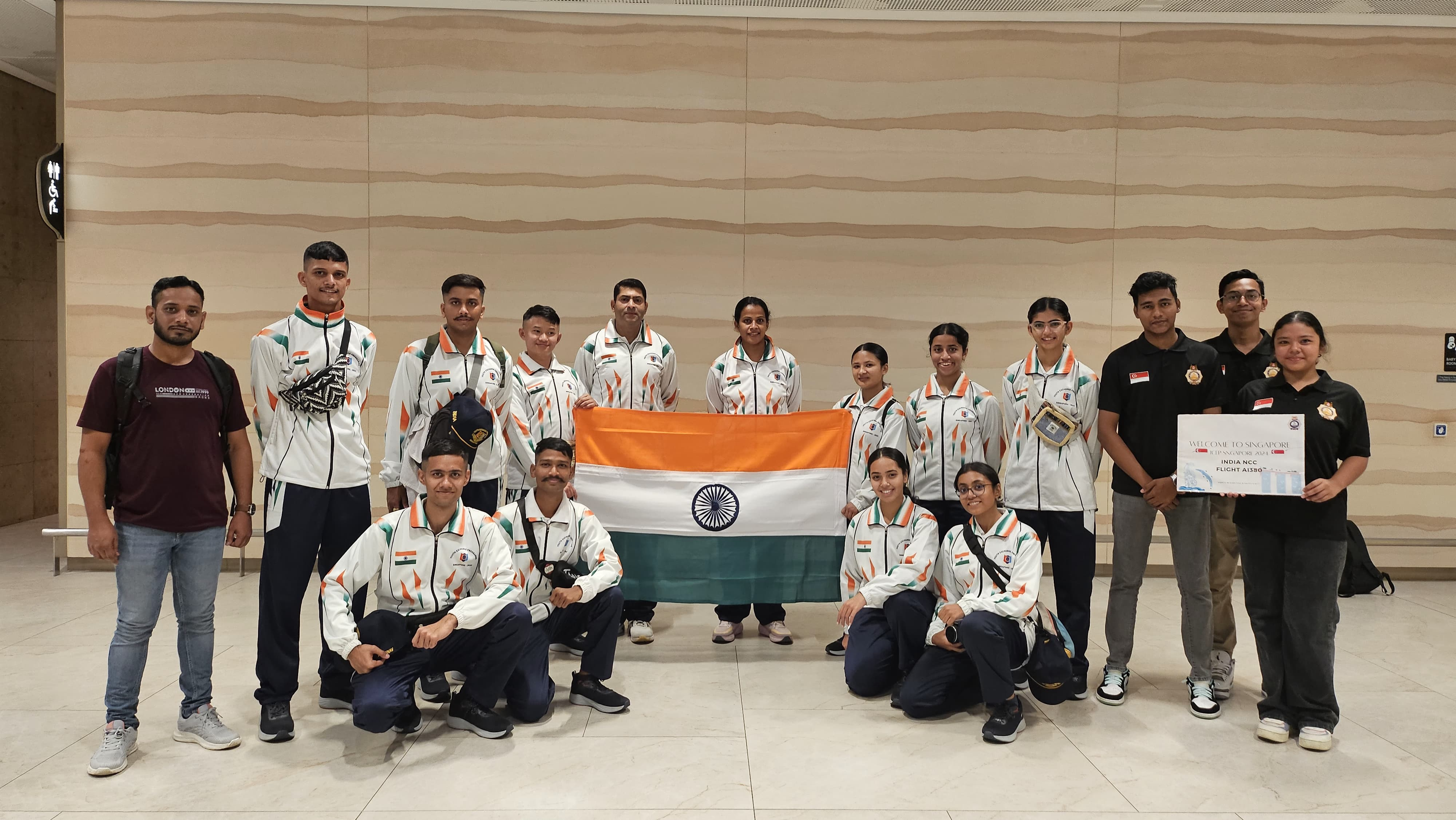
Cadets of the Indian National Cadet Corps

In India, the National Cadet Corps is a voluntary cadet organisation for motivating college students to pursue a career in the Indian Armed Forces. It aims to develop qualities of character, discipline, teamwork, leadership and adventure in the students. The corps organizes outdoor activities, such as camping, trekking, mountain climbing, etc. besides providing small arms training to cadets. Cadets do not commit serving in the armed forces but are given a preference by the Services Selection Board when applying for officer commissions in the military services.

== New Zealand ==
The New Zealand Cadet Forces is a voluntary youth organisation run in partnership with the New Zealand Defence Force. It includes the New Zealand Sea Cadet Corps, the New Zealand Cadet Corps, and the Air Training Corps.

== Russia ==
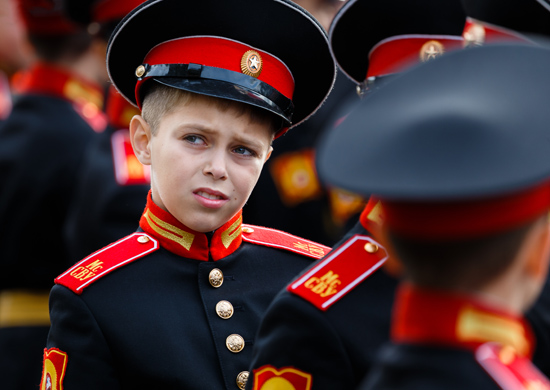
A cadet of the Suvorov Military School, a state-sponsored military boarding school

In Russia, cadets are students who study in the Cadet Corps which are military schools subordinate to the Russian Ministry of Defence, they provide secondary education and also have additional military-related classes which are to prepare children for future service.

== Singapore ==
In Singapore, there are three national cadet forces, the National Cadet Corps, the National Police Cadet Corps (NPCC), and the National Civil Defence Cadet Corps (NCDCC). Secondary school students who are members of these three organisations are called 'cadets'.

In NPCC and NCDCC, the rank of Cadet is below the rank of Lance Corporal. For NPCC, Secondary One students officially attain the rank of Cadet at their Area's Swearing-In Ceremony. Cadets do not bear any rank insignia; however, the letters 'NPCC' and 'NCDCC' are at the bottom of the rank to differentiate NPCC and NCDCC Cadets from Singapore Police Force and Singapore Civil Defence Force personnel respectively.

In addition, there are six other cadet programmes (also known as Uniformed Groups) in Singapore, namely:

- Boys' Brigade
- Girls' Brigade
- Girl Guides
- Red Cross Youth
- Scouts
- St John Brigade

== Sri Lanka ==
The National Cadet Corps is a volunteer youth organisation in Sri Lanka, sponsored by the Ministry of Defence, which operates in schools. Its activities (Cadet and Cadet Band) are open for secondary school students on voluntary basis and its officers are government teachers and educational administrators, who serve as instructors. The National Cadet Corps presently consists of nine Provincial Headquarters, two Training Centres, and thirty Battalions deployed island wide. Approximately, 100,000 school cadets organised in to 4492 cadet platoons and 279 cadet band platoons are registered and trained by the NCC.

The Cadet Corps was initiated in 1881 by John B. Cull at Royal College, Colombo as a platoon attached to the Ceylon Light Infantry Volunteers with the intention of inculcating discipline in students through drill.

The NCC is headed by a Director of a senior military rank, commonly a Major General, who is appointed by the president of Sri Lanka. Although its officers and cadets have no liability for active military service many officers volunteer for secondment to the Sri Lanka Armed Forces during national emergencies or are mobilised under national service. Traditionally the Cadet Corps has served as a source for officers for the regular forces of the Sri Lankan military.

== South Africa ==
South Africa has a long history of having cadets, with many schools having their own corps, however after the end of apartheid they were phased out. Cadets exist today, with some schools still maintaining their own unit. The South African Sea Cadets are also still in existence.

== United Kingdom and British Overseas Territories ==
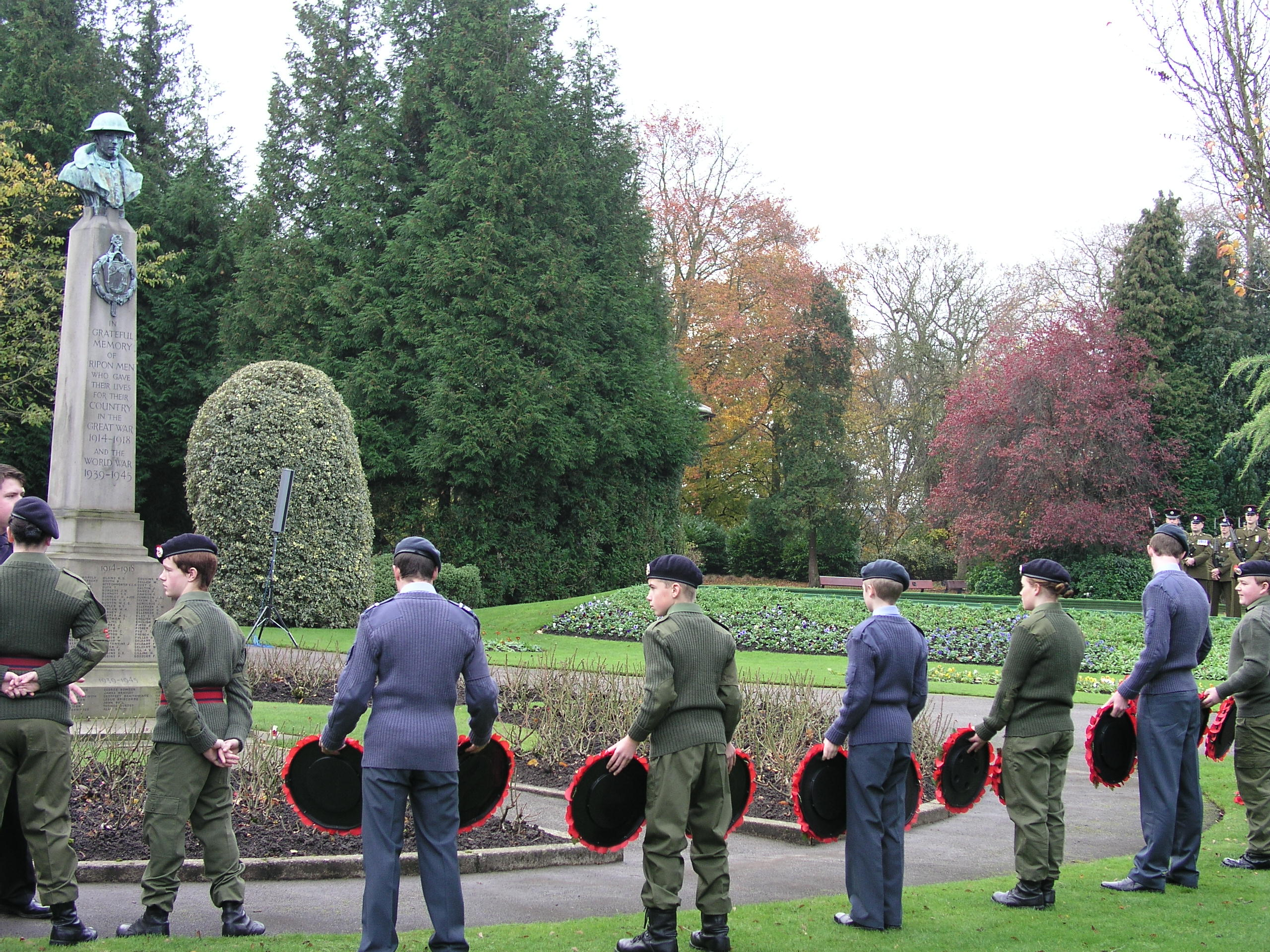
Cadets of the Air Training Corps and the Army Cadet Force during a Remembrance Sunday ceremony

In the United Kingdom, the cadet forces are the Community Cadet Forces, Combined Cadet Force and the Volunteer Cadet Corps.

Other cadet organisations include Police Cadets, and St John Ambulance Cadets and Fire Cadets.

Cadet corps in British Overseas Territories have generally been independent of the cadet forces operating in the UK. The Bermuda Cadet Corps (disbanded in 2012 and replaced with Junior Leaders of the Royal Bermuda Regiment) was originally administered along with approved cadet corps in the British Isles by the War Office, but did not go on to form part of the Army Cadet Force or the Army Section of the Combined Cadet Force. The Bermuda Sea Cadet Corps is actually part of the Sea Cadet Corps. The Bermuda Police Service junior Police Cadets programme is for secondary school students (the modifier "Junior" being necessary to distinguish the programme from the Police Cadet programme for young adults studying at the Bermuda College, which functions as a path of entry into the service). Other cadet corps currently operating in British Overseas Territories include the Anguilla Cadet Corps, the Cayman Islands Cadet Corps, the Gibraltar Cadet Force and 2 Overseas (Gibraltar) Squadron, Air Training Corps (ATC), the Montserrat Secondary School Cadet Corps (now including a Sea Cadet Detachment), the Turks and Caicos Islands Cadet Corps, and the Virgin Islands Cadet Corps.

== United States ==
Youth cadet organisations in the United States include the American Cadet Alliance, the California Cadet Corps, the United States Naval Sea Cadet Corps, the Young Marines and the Civil Air Patrol. Students enrolled in military-themed secondary education academies or school programs, like the California Cadet Corps and the Junior Reserve Officers' Training Corps, are also referred to as cadets. The oldest and precursor program of the United States is the California Cadet Corps.

== See also ==
- Cadet Corps
- Cadet rifle
- Sea cadet
- JROTC

== See also ==
Media related to Cadet organizations at Wikimedia Commons
