= Cadet Corps (disambiguation) =

Cadet Corps or Corps of Cadets is a type of military school, or a youth naval or military training organisation operating either through civilian (usually secondary) schools (such as the Bermuda Cadet Corps or the various school cadet corps that were collected into the Army Cadet Force), or independent of the School System (such as the Sea Cadet Corps and Girls' Nautical Training Corps). It may also refer to:

== Military education ==
- Cadet Corps (Russia), a type of military school in Russia
- Corps of Cadets (Warsaw), a school in the Polish-Lithuanian Commonwealth
- California Cadet Corps, a paramilitary youth organization
- The Corps of Cadets at the United States Military Academy
- The Corps of Cadets at University of North Georgia
- South Carolina Corps of Cadets, the Corps of Cadets at The Citadel, The Military College of South Carolina
- Texas A&M University Corps of Cadets
- Virginia Tech Corps of Cadets
- The Corps of Cadets at Fork Union Military Academy
- The Corps of Cadets at Marine Military Academy
- The Corps of Cadets at Norwich University
- The Corps of Cadets at California Maritime Academy

== United Kingdom and British Overseas Territories ==
- Air Training Corps
- Army Cadet Force
- Bermuda Cadet Corps
- Cayman Islands Cadet Corps
- Combined Cadet Force
- Girls' Nautical Training Corps
- Montserrat Secondary School Cadet Corps
- Royal Marines Cadets
- Sea Cadets (United Kingdom) (Sea Cadet Corps)
- Volunteer Cadet Corps

== Canada ==
- Royal Canadian Army Cadets

== See also ==
- National Cadet Corps (disambiguation)
