= Youth organisations in the United Kingdom =

There are many national organisations in the United Kingdom and its overseas territories that have been established to provide services to people under the age of 18.

== Junior Leaders ==
In the British Army, Junior Leaders were subunits within corps or regiments (such as the Junior Leader Regiment of the Royal Artillery, the Junior Parachute Company, or the Junior Leaders Company of the Royal Bermuda Regiment) that enrolled junior soldiers to provide them with military training with an emphasis on leadership. Although junior soldiers were not liable for active service, they would go on to, or be encouraged to go on to, adult service on coming of age. Today, junior soldiers are recruited into the Army Foundation College, although the Royal Bermuda Regiment resurrected its Junior Leaders programme in 2012 when the Bermuda Cadet Corps was disbanded.

== Military cadet organisations ==
=== Air Training Corps ===
The Air Training Corps (ATC) is a British cadet organisation; a voluntary youth group which is part of the Royal Air Force Air Cadets (formerly known as the Air Cadet Organisation or ACO) and is sponsored by the Royal Air Force (RAF) under No 22 Group. It is supported by the Ministry of Defence; a regular RAF officer served as Commandant Air Cadets at the rank of Air Commodore until 2012, when the post was changed (as part of the ongoing defence cuts) to a Full Time Reserve Service (FTRS) position, also at Air Commodore rank. The cadets and the majority of staff are civilians. Although a number of ATC cadets go on to join the RAF or other services every year, the ATC is no longer set up as a recruiting organisation.

Activities include sport, hill walking, parade drill, rock climbing, rifle shooting, fieldcraft and other outdoor activities, as well as the study of subjects related to aviation, leading to a national vocational diploma (BTEC in Aviation Studies and others including Teamwork and Leadership). Week-long trips to RAF stations in the UK and abroad, or camps offering adventure training or music, allow the opportunity for cadets to gain a taste of military life and often to gain some flying experience in RAF gliders.

A teenager can join at the age of 12 or school year 8 as a junior cadet and earn positions of increasing responsibility in a military rank structure, as well as having increasing skill and competence recognised in a classification scheme. Service as a cadet ends at the age of 20. In 2012, the ATC had around 41,000 cadets aged between 13 and 20 years, in 1009 squadrons. Its cadets are supported by a network of around 10,000 volunteer staff and around 5,000 civilian committee members.

=== Army Cadet Force ===
The Army Cadet Force (ACF) is a British youth organisation that offers training and experience around a military training theme including adventurous training, at the same time as promoting achievement, discipline, and good citizenship, to boys and girls aged 12 to 18 years old. It is a separate organisation from the Combined Cadet Force which provides similar training within principally independent schools.

Although sponsored by the Ministry of Defence the ACF is not a branch of the British Armed Forces, and as such cadets are not subject to military 'call up'. Some cadets do, however, go on to enlist in the armed forces in later life, and many of the organisation's leaders have been cadets or have a military background. Cadets do participate with the regular army on some occasions, however.

=== Combined Cadet Force ===
The Combined Cadet Force (CCF) is a Ministry of Defence sponsored youth organisation in the United Kingdom. Founded in 1948, its aim is to "provide a disciplined organisation in a school so that pupils may develop powers of leadership by means of training to promote the qualities of responsibility, self reliance, resourcefulness, endurance and perseverance". It is not a pre-service organisation, although it acknowledges that one of its objectives is "to encourage those who have an interest in the services to become Officers of the Regular or Reserve Forces", and a significant number of officers have indeed had experience in the CCF. Prior to 1948 cadet forces in schools existed as the junior division of the Officers' Training Corps framework, but in 1948 Combined Cadet Force was formed covering cadets affiliated to all three services.

=== Girls Venture Corps Air Cadets ===
The Girls Venture Corps Air Cadets (GVCAC) is a voluntary uniformed youth organisation for girls aged between 11 and 20. It is also a registered charity, and by virtue of its work towards the personal and social development of young people, it is a member of The National Council for Voluntary Youth Services (NCVYS). The current Corps Director is Brenda Layne, MBE, and the Corps Commandant is Yvonne McCarthy. The GVCAC receives no funding from the Ministry of Defence (MoD). All adult staff members are subject to security and Criminal Records (CRB) checks.

=== Royal Marines Cadets ===
Royal Marines Cadets are part of the Sea Cadets. They take part in all the same waterborne activities, as well as branching off into adventure training and military skills.

=== Royal Marines Volunteer Cadet Corps ===
The Royal Marines Volunteer Cadet Corps is a MOD sponsored cadet organisation in the United Kingdom which is linked to the Royal Marines. The Royal Marines Volunteer Cadet Corps is part of the tri-partite family of 'Royal Marines Cadets'.

=== Royal Naval Volunteer Cadet Corps ===
The Royal Naval Volunteer Cadet Corps is a MOD sponsored cadet organisation in the United Kingdom which is linked to the Royal Navy.

=== Sea Cadet Corps ===
The Sea Cadet Corps (SCC) is a UK national youth organisation which is sponsored by the MOD senior service the Royal Navy and open to young people between the ages of 10 and 18 years old. The SCC is the UK's largest Naval Cadet Force with over 30,000 cadets and adult volunteers. Cadets follow similar rates and ranks, traditions, values and ethos as their parent service, the Royal Navy for the Sea cadets and for the Royal Marines Cadets the Royal Marines.

Whilst the SCC is not a pre-service organisation, a significant minority of former Sea Cadets and Royal Marines Cadets do go on to join the Royal Navy, Royal Marines or other sections of the Armed Forces.

=== Anguilla Cadet Corps ===
Anguilla Cadet Corps operates in the British Overseas Territory of Anguilla.

=== Bermuda Sea Cadet Corps ===
The Bermuda Sea Cadet Corps was created in 1966 and registered as a charity under the Bermuda Sea Cadet Association Act, 1968. The first unit had actually been created two years earlier.

=== Cayman Islands Cadet Corps ===
The Cayman Islands Cadet Corps established in 2002 in the British Overseas Territory of the Cayman Islands. The CICC has direct ties to the Cayman Islands Regiment.

=== Cayman Islands Sea Cadet Corps ===
The Cayman Islands Sea Cadet Corps initially was a detachment under the Cayman Islands Cadet Corps as the Marine Detachment. In 2024 Marine Detachment of the CICC separated and was re-branded as the Cayman Islands Sea Cadet Corps. CISC has direct ties to the Cayman Islands Coast Guard.

=== Gibraltar Cadet Force and Gibraltar Air Cadets ===
Gibraltar Cadet Force (to be renamed The Royal Gibraltar Regiment Army Cadet Force in 2024) and 2 Overseas (Gibraltar) Squadron, Air Training Corps (ATC) operate in the British Overseas Territory of Gibraltar.

=== Montserrat Secondary School Cadet Corps ===
Montserrat Secondary School Cadet Corps, now including a Sea Cadet Detachment, operates in the British Overseas Territory of Montserrat.

=== Royal Jersey Militia Army Cadets ===
Royal Jersey Militia Army Cadets, Bristol & The Channel Islands Army Cadets, at Granville School and Le Quesne Barracks.

=== Turks and Caicos Islands Cadet Corps ===
Turks and Caicos Islands Cadet Corps, operates in the British Overseas Territory of the Turks and Caicos Islands.

=== Virgin Islands Cadet Corps ===
Virgin Islands Cadet Corps, operates in the British Overseas Territory of the British Virgin Islands.

== Uniformed services cadet organisations ==
=== Fire Cadets ===
Many fire brigades in the United Kingdom offer a cadet service to young people. The main aim of the cadet service is to provide a disciplined environment for young people aged 13 to 18, from all sectors of society, to learn basic fire service skills and core values. This in turn leads many young people to continue their involvement with the brigade by joining either retained or full time service.

=== St John Ambulance Cadets ===
St John Ambulance Cadets is a youth section of St John Ambulance for members aged between 10 and 17 (inclusive). It was founded in 1922, in order to train young people in first aid, and other essential skills. It has grown to be one of the biggest youth organisations in the United Kingdom, with over 20,000 members. Members take part in a very wide variety of activities, including providing first aid at major and community events, attending camps, completing awards, participating in competitions, learning leadership and training skills and fundraising.

=== Volunteer Police Cadets ===
There are a number of Volunteer Police Cadet schemes for young people aged (in most cases) between 14 and 18. These groups are designed to provide a sense of what it is like to be a police officer, by getting cadets involved in various police related activities, such as crime prevention projects. Some forces allow cadets to go out on patrol with Police Officers in connection with non-confrontational policing duties, once they reach the age of 14. Each scheme is sponsored by a statutory police service, although it has a separate identity, and in that sense is more distant from regular policing than the work of the former full-time Police Cadets. In most forces there are no formal entry requirements to become a cadet.

== Scouting organisations ==
=== Baden-Powell Scouts' Association ===
The Baden-Powell Scouts' Association was formed in the United Kingdom in 1970 when it was felt that The Scout Association was abandoning the traditions and intentions set out by Baden-Powell in 1908. The Baden-Powell Scouts retain the belief that the essence of the movement should be based on outdoor activities related to the skills of explorers, backwoodsmen and frontiersmen.

It is a voluntary, non-formal educational charity movement for young people. It is independent, non-political, non-military, and open to all without distinction of origin, race, creed or gender, in accordance with the purpose, principles and method conceived by Robert Baden-Powell.

As an independent Scout Association, they are members of the World Federation of Independent Scouts (WFIS).

=== British Boy Scouts and British Girl Scouts Association ===
The British Boy Scouts and British Girl Scouts Association (BBS & BGS Association; also known as The Brotherhood of British Scouts) is an early Scouting organisation, having begun as the Battersea Boy Scouts in 1908. The organisation was renamed as the British Boy Scouts and launched as a national organisation on 24 May 1909. In association with other scout organisations, the BBS formed the National Peace Scouts in 1910. The BBS instigated the first international Scouting organisation, the Order of World Scouts in 1911.

=== European Scout Federation ===
The European Scout Federation (British Association) is a Traditional Scouting organisation. It is a part of the Scout Movement in the United Kingdom. The original training scheme set out by Robert Baden-Powell is still used. The original uniform is still worn today, including the broad brimmed hats, khaki shirts and shorts, making the wearer instantly recognisable as a Scout.

=== Girlguiding ===
Girlguiding is the operating name of The Guide Association, the national Guiding organisation of the United Kingdom. Guiding began in the UK in 1910 as an organisation especially for girls run along similar lines to Scouting for Boys. The Guide Association was a founder member of the World Association of Girl Guides and Girl Scouts (WAGGGS) in 1928. In 2012, the Association had more than 538,000 members and continues to be the largest girl only youth organisation in the UK.

At present about one in four of all eight-year-old girls in the UK are Brownies.

Girlguiding is a charitable organisation and adult leaders are not paid for their time. For this reason, and for its work aiming for the personal and social development of young people, Girlguiding is a member of The National Council for Voluntary Youth Services (NCVYS).

=== Kibbo Kift ===
The Kibbo Kift was a youth organisation in the UK between 1920 and 1951. The Kibbo Kift (archaic Kentish dialect for 'proof of great strength') has been described as 'the only genuine English national movement of modern times'. The Kibbo Kift was to be not merely a youth organisation but was to involve all ages and, very daring for the times, it was open to both sexes. The ideas of world peace and the regeneration of urban man through the open-air life replaced the nationalism and militarism Hargrave had detested in the post-World War I Scouts.

By 1932 the Anglo-Saxon costumes, camping, hiking and woodcraft had been replaced by military uniform, marching and propagandising. The name was changed to the Green Shirt Movement for Social Credit, and later to the Social Credit Party of Great Britain. The organisation was wound up in 1951.

=== Navigators UK ===
Navigators UK is a branch of Navigators USA, an American non-aligned Scouting organisation that was founded in 2003 in New York City. Navigators UK was founded in 2013 by Scout Leaders from the UK Scout Association who felt there had to be a "more community and family focused version of Scouting" that was "truly led by young people". The Navigators UK is a Christian Faith organisation.

=== Pathfinder Scouts Association ===
The Pathfinder Scouts Association (PSA) is an independent Traditional Scouting Association in the United Kingdom.

=== The Scout Association ===
Following the origin of Scouting in 1907, The Scout Association was formed in 1910 and incorporated in 1912 by a royal charter under its previous name of The Boy Scouts Association.

The current stated purpose of The Scout Association is to "actively engage and support young people in their personal development, empowering them to make a positive contribution to society". The association achieves this through what it terms the Scout Method and through a youth programme for people aged between 6 and 25. Its 2013 census shows that 433,850 children and youths (aged 6 to 25) were participants in the association's programs, with a further 38,000 young people waiting to enroll in the programs. These were led by 83,511 adults It is the largest Scout association in Europe, representing 35% of the membership of the European Scout Region.

=== The Woodcraft Folk ===
Woodcraft Folk is a UK-based educational movement for children and young people. Founded in 1925 it has been a registered charity since 1965 and a registered company limited by guarantee since 2012. The constitutional object of this youth organisation is "to educate and empower young people to be able to participate actively in society, improving their lives and others' through active citizenship."

== Faith-based organisations ==
=== Boys' Brigade ===
The Boys' Brigade (BB) is an interdenominational Christian youth organisation, conceived by Sir William Alexander Smith to combine drill and fun activities with Christian values. Following its inception in Glasgow in 1883, the BB quickly spread across the United Kingdom and became a worldwide organisation by the early 1890s.

=== Church Lads' and Church Girls' Brigade ===
The Church Lads' and Church Girls' Brigade is a Church of England youth organisation with branches in the United Kingdom, Ireland, Bermuda, Kenya, South Africa, Newfoundland and St Helena. Its origins lie in the formation in 1891 of the Church Lads' Brigade with its sister organisation, the Church Nursing and Ambulance Brigade for Young Women and Girls, later the Church Girls' Brigade, founded in 1901. The two respective founders were Walter M Gee and Rev Thomas Milner. The two Brigades amalgamated in 1978 to form the Church Lads' and Church Girls' Brigade.

The Church Lads' Brigade was one of the founding members of The National Council for Voluntary Youth Services (NCVYS), and the Church Lads' and Church Girls' Brigade remains a member by virtue of its work towards the personal and social development of young people.

=== Girls' Brigade ===
The Girls' Brigade is an international and interdenominational Christian youth organisation. It was founded in 1893 in Dublin, Ireland. The modern organisation was formed as the result of the amalgamation of three like-minded and similarly structured organisations in 1964. These organisations were the Girls' Brigade of Ireland (1893), the Girls' Guildry of Scotland (1900), and the Girls' Life Brigade of England (1902). The international headquarters are in Glasgow.

=== Hindu Youth UK ===
Hindu Youth UK (HYUK) is a non-sectarian, non-political initiative that seeks to inspire, educate and inform youth across the UK and providing a platform to involve youngsters from all Hindu community organisations.

=== Jewish Lads' and Girls' Brigade ===
The Jewish Lads' and Girls' Brigade (JLGB) is a national Jewish youth organisation based in and primarily serving the United Kingdom. The UK's oldest Jewish youth movement, it was founded in 1895 as the Jewish Lads' Brigade by Colonel Albert E. W. Goldsmid, a senior army officer, to provide an interest for children of the many poor immigrant families who were coming into England at that time. The first company was launched in London's East End but others soon appeared throughout the city and the provinces. The movement later spread as far as South Africa and Canada.

=== Pathfinders ===
The Pathfinder Club, or simply Pathfinders, is a department of the Seventh-day Adventist Church (SDA), which works specifically with the cultural, social and religious education of children and adolescents located in the age group between 10 and 15 years.

Similar in many respects to Scouting, this differs by religious emphasis on their activities. Part of the official program of the Adventist Church since 1950. Globally the Pathfinder Club is part of the church's youth ministry, which is the Australian director Gilbert Cangy.

=== The Young Muslims UK ===
The Young Muslims UK was established in 1984 and celebrated its 25th anniversary in 2009. It became the youth wing of the Islamic Society of Britain (ISB) in 1990 with an aim to "provide a vehicle for committed young British Muslims to combine their knowledge, skills and efforts for the benefit of one another and British society as a whole."

The Young Muslims UK is an affiliate body of the Muslim Council of Britain.

== Sports and activity organisations ==
=== Camping Club Youth ===
The Camping and Caravan Club, founded in 1901, offer a youth club encouraging young people to take part in camping and outdoors activities.

=== Pony Club ===
Pony Club was formed in Great Britain in 1929 when the Institute of the Horse formed a youth branch of their organisation, "The Pony Club." It was formed to encourage children to start riding, while providing them with opportunities in the field that they would not be able to reach on their own. The group grew rapidly, with 300 members in 1930, to over 10,000 in 1935. When the Institute of the Horse joined with National Horse Association of Great Britain to form The British Horse Society, Pony Club was incorporated into the new group.

=== Young Royal Kennel Club ===
The Young Royal Kennel Club is the youth section of the Royal Kennel Club. Open to young people who love dogs and open to anyone aged between the ages of 6 and 24 years.

=== Girls Friendly Society ===
Girls Friendly Society is a youth organisation for girls and young women aged from 6 to 25 in England and Wales.

=== The Great Friendship Project ===
The Great Friendship Project is a UK-based non-profit organisation that works to address loneliness and social isolation through community programmes, campaigns and partnerships. Founded in 2021 and based in London, it primarily supports young adults, particularly those in their 20s and 30s.

The organisation delivers structured social activities and interventions designed to support friendship formation, social confidence and community connection. Its work is informed by research on loneliness and includes collaboration with public institutions, charities and private sector organisations.

Since its formation, The Great Friendship Project has delivered hundreds of community activities, contributed to national discussions on loneliness policy and research, and developed a large community of participants across the United Kingdom.

== Youth wings of political parties ==
=== Conservative Future ===
Conservative Future (CF) was the youth movement of the Conservative Party in England, Wales, and Northern Ireland. The organisation was made up of all members of the Conservative Party who were 30 years old or younger.

Conservative Future was founded in 1998. By 2006, it was the largest political organisation on British campuses and the estimated membership, including members on campuses and through constituency associations was 20,000. It dissolved in 2016.

Conservative Future Scotland is the independent sister organisation of CF in Scotland. Internationally, Conservative Future participates in the centre-right International Young Democrat Union.

=== Young Liberals ===
Liberal Democrat members who are under 26 years old or attending higher/further education institutions are automatically members of Liberal Youth if they agree to share this information at registration. The group is financially supported by the party and has offices in the Liberal Democrats' London headquarters.

=== Plaid Ifanc ===
Plaid Ifanc is the youth and student wing of Plaid Cymru. CymruX (the predecessor organisation of Plaid Cymru Youth and Plaid Ifanc) was founded in 2005 to merge Plaid Cymru's two existing movements into one new youth movement. The student federation and the youth movement were merged to create a brand new youth organisation available to anyone under the age of 30.

=== BNP Youth ===
BNP Youth (formerly Resistance, Young BNP, Youth BNP, YBNP) is the youth section of the far-right British National Party (BNP). In 2010 it was named BNP Crusaders but in 2011 it changed its name to "Resistance". The group falls under the arm of the British Nationalist Youth Movement with other groups such as BNP Students. The YBNP claimed to be a civil rights movement and student pressure group for "indigenous" (white) British students from 6th form onwards.

=== Young Greens of England and Wales ===
The Young Greens (of England and Wales) is the official youth branch of the Green Party of England and Wales. All members of the GPEW who are under 30 years old or full-time students are members of the Young Greens and are allowed to get involved with their activities.

The Scottish Greens also have a youth branch, the Scottish Young Greens, who work with the England and Wales group. Young Greens is affiliated with the Federation of Young European Greens.

=== Scottish Young Greens ===
The Scottish Young Greens describes itself as the "radical, independent youth wing of the Scottish Green Party". It also describes itself as "pro-equality and anti-environmental destruction", opposing capitalism and supporting an independent Scotland inside the European Union.

=== Young Independence ===
Young Independence (YI) is the youth wing of the UK Independence Party (UKIP) and represents all UKIP members under the age of 30. The wing was formed during the 2007 annual UKIP conference by the then NEC member Delroy Young.

=== Young Labour ===
Young Labour is the youth section of the UK Labour Party. Membership is automatic for Labour Party members aged 14 to 26.

It exists to involve young people in the Labour Party and ensure that the aspirations of young people are reflected in Labour’s policies in power. Young Labour members are able to get involved in the Labour Party through local policy events, campaigning or by attending events and social gatherings.

Young Labour hosts an annual conference, alternating between national committee elections and policy conferences every other year. Young Labour also holds a range of additional national events, including fringe sessions at the Labour Party's annual conference.

=== Young Scots for Independence ===
Young Scots for Independence is a youth organisation set up to campaign for Scottish independence through the Scottish National Party (SNP). It is independent of, though affiliated to, the SNP. Formed in the 1981 as the Young Scottish Nationalists the organisation changed its name to YSI in 1996 when the YSN underwent a complete reorganisation.

== Other ==
=== Urdd Gobaith Cymru ===
Urdd Gobaith Cymru Welsh pronunciation: [ˈɨrð ˈɡɔbaiθ ˈkəmrɨ]; the "Welsh League of Hope", but normally translated as the "Welsh League of Youth"), or merely referred to as the Urdd, is a Welsh-medium youth movement with over 1,500 branches and over 50,000 members (as of 2006). The Urdd organises activities for its members ranging from small-scale meetings to the Urdd eisteddfod which lasts for a week, is attended by tens of thousands of visitors (over 100,000 in 2005) and is televised on S4C. The Urdd is Wales's largest youth organisation.

=== Young Farmers ===
The National Federation of Young Farmers' Clubs is a rural youth organisation in the United Kingdom. The Federation covers various Young Farmers' Clubs (YFCs) throughout England and Wales, helping support young people in agriculture and the countryside. It does not include YFCs from Scotland or Ireland.

The first Young Farmers' Club opened in 1921 in Hemyock, Devon, where the United Dairies milk factory set children of the area's milk producers the task of calf rearing, with competitions and prizes for those achieving the highest standards.

Over the next decade more clubs opened to provide agricultural education, with the focus on the keeping of growing and living things including calves, pigs, poultry, bees and gardens.

After the death of one of YFC's original founders and greatest inspirations, Lord Northcliffe, in 1922 the Ministry of Agriculture took on development of the organisation. But within six years it was proving difficult for it to offer the type of help needed by the members to organise the 50 clubs or offer guidance on the rural social role Young Farmers' Clubs were assuming.

Membership is steadily increasing and there is a significant increase in the number of junior members joining the organisation.

=== UK Youth Climate Coalition ===
The UK Youth Climate Coalition describes its mission is to "mobilise and empower young people to take positive action for global climate justice". It describes its values as "amplifying youth voices, systemic change, non-violence, transparency, anti-oppression, inclusivity, diversity and independence."
