= National Cadet Corps =

National Cadet Corps may refer to:

- Bangladesh National Cadet Corps
- National Cadet Corps (Ghana)
- National Cadet Corps (India)
- National Cadet Corps (Pakistan)
- National Cadet Corps (Singapore)
- National Cadet Corps (Sri Lanka)
- National Cadet Corps (Maldives)
