= Hilgenberg =

Hilgenberg is a surname. Notable people with the surname include:

- Herb Hilgenberg (born 1937), Canadian meteorologist
- Jay Hilgenberg (born 1959), American football player
- Jerry Hilgenberg (1931–2024), American football player and coach
- Joel Hilgenberg (born 1962), American football player
- Steve Hilgenberg (1944–2011), American politician
- Wally Hilgenberg (1942–2008), American football player
