= Rajmund Rembieliński =

Polish nobleman, political activist and landowner

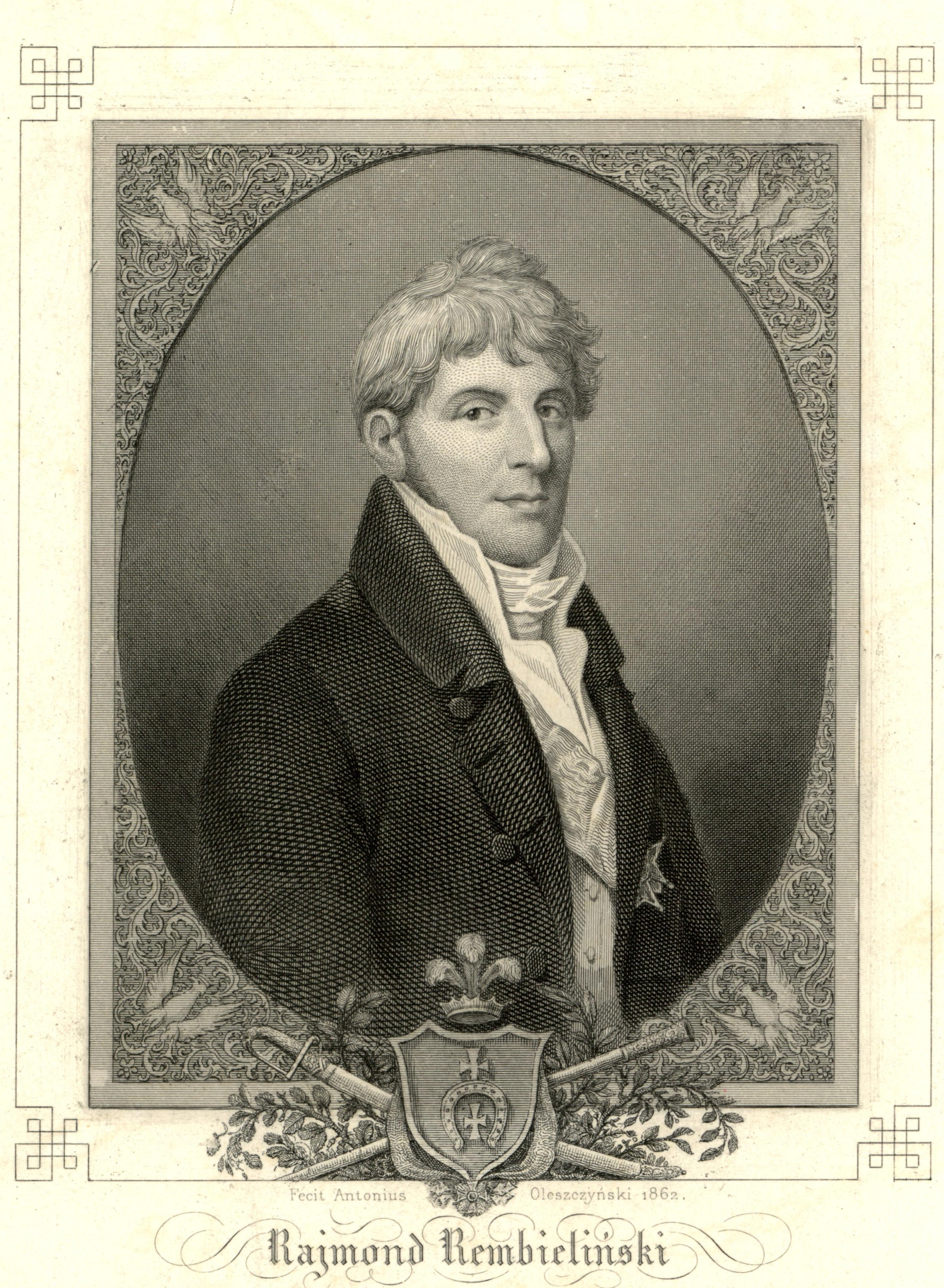
- Rajmund Rembieliński
- Coat of arms: Lubicz
- Born: 1774; Warsaw
- Died: 12 February 1841 (aged 66–67); Łomża
- Noble family: Rembieliński

Rajmund Rembieliński (1774–1841) was a Polish nobleman (szlachcic), political activist, and landowner.

Rembieliński owned estates in Jedwabne, Krośniewice and Giełczyn. He was a graduate of the Knight School in Warsaw (1788–1792). He participated in the Kościuszko Uprising. After the downfall of Poland he became member of independence organisations. As the French Army of Napoleon Bonaparte enter occupied Poland, he organized Polish administrations in Białystok and Łomża.

He was member of the Sejm and Sejm Marshal in Polish Congress Poland in 1818, 1820 and 1825. He participated in the November Uprising. After the fall of the Uprising he refused to execute the order of the Czar to confiscate the estates and property of participants in the uprising. For that he was dismissed from all offices and received a lifelong ban from working in the administration.

Rembieliński was author of numerous economic, agriculture and social-political works. He died on 12 February 1841 in Łomża.

== Awards ==
- Knight of the Order of Saint Stanislaus
- Order of St. Vladimir
- Order of Saint Anna
