= Corps of Cadets (Warsaw) =

State school in the Polish–Lithuanian Commonwealth

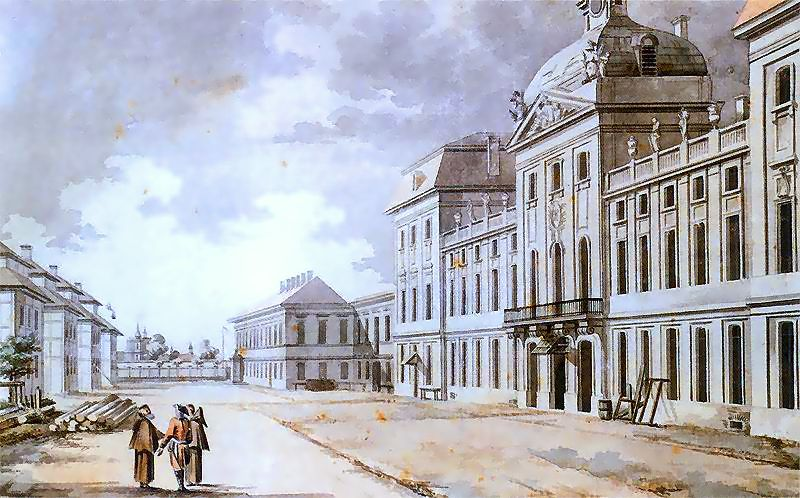
Corps of Cadets, Warsaw, by Zygmunt Vogel

The Warsaw Corps of Cadets (English: School of Chivalry; Polish: Szkoła Rycerska or Akademia Szlachecka Korpusu Kadetów) was the first state school in the Polish–Lithuanian Commonwealth.

== History ==
=== 18th century ===
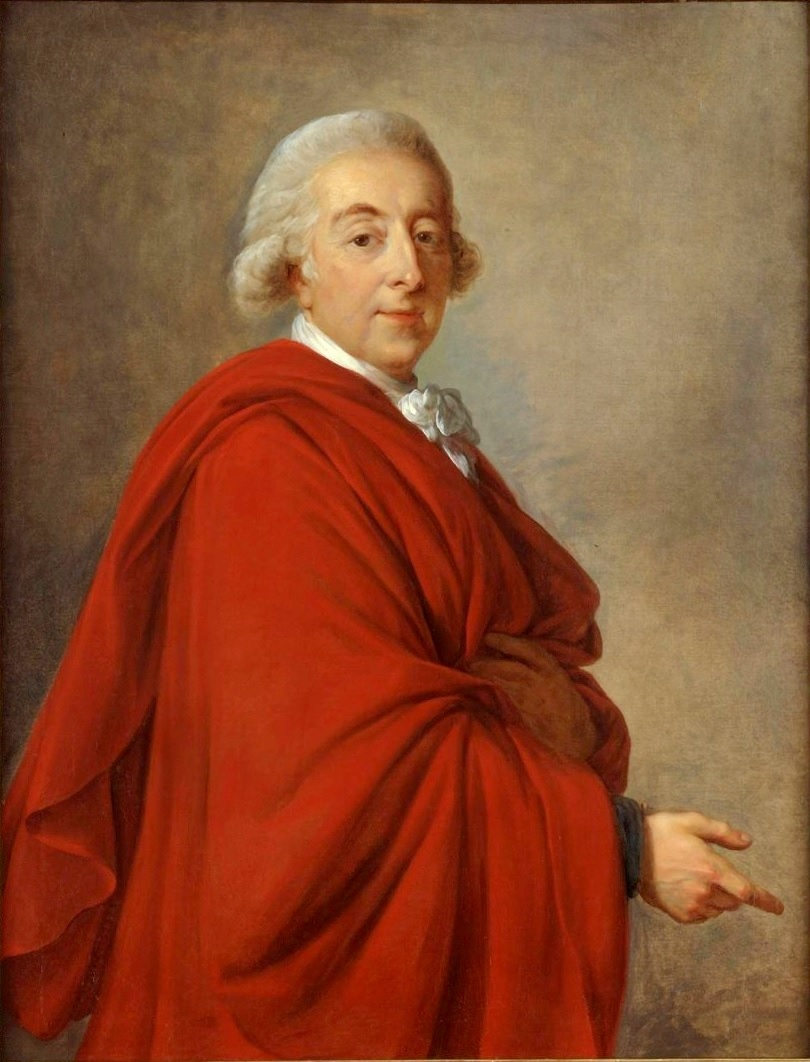
Adam Kazimierz Czartoryski, 18th-century commandant of the Corps of Cadets

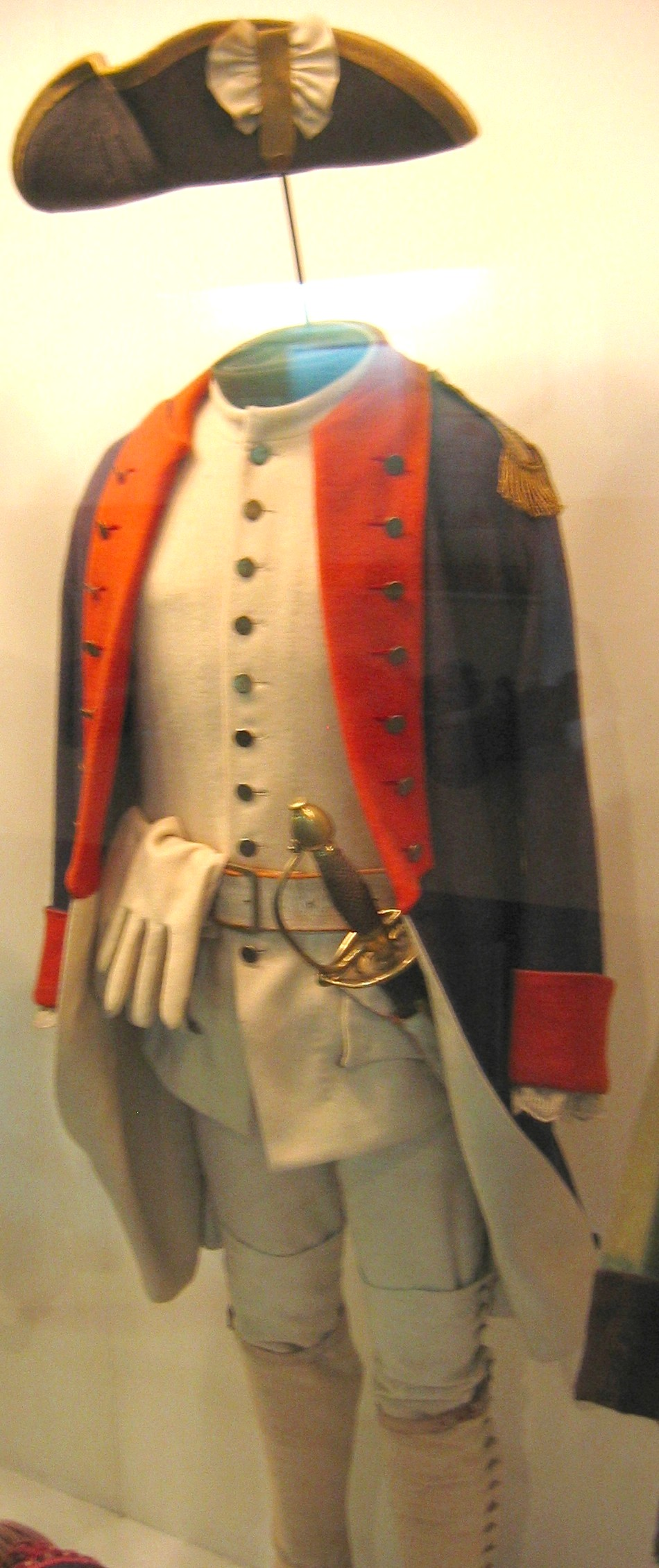
18th-century uniform of a cadet

The state Corps of Cadets was established in Warsaw on 15 March 1765 by King Stanisław August Poniatowski and was housed in the Kazimierz Palace (Pałac Kazimierzowski, now the rectorate of Warsaw University). The Corps' commandant was Prince Adam Kazimierz Czartoryski. The school was closed in 1795 following the suppression of the Kościuszko Uprising, which had been led by one of the Corps' first alumni, Tadeusz Kościuszko.

In the reign of Stanisław August Poniatowski, several private corps of cadets were also established: by A. Tyzenhauz at Grodno, K. Radziwiłł at Nieśwież, W. Potocki at Niemirów, A. Sułkowski at Rydzyna.

=== Interbellum ===
In the period between the two World Wars, the institution of the Corps of Cadets would be revived in Poland. Three state secondary schools of that name would be created: at Kraków (later at Lwów), at Modlin (later at Chełmno) and at Rawicz.

=== After World War II ===
After World War II, in the People's Republic of Poland, until 1956, there existed in Warsaw a Corps of Cadets of the Internal Security Corps (Korpus Bezpieczeństwa Wewnętrznego).

=== Revival ===
The original Corps' work is continued by Fundacja Szkoła Rycerska.

== Notable administrators ==
- Michał Jan Hube, director and physicist
- John Lind, governor and writer

== Notable alumni ==
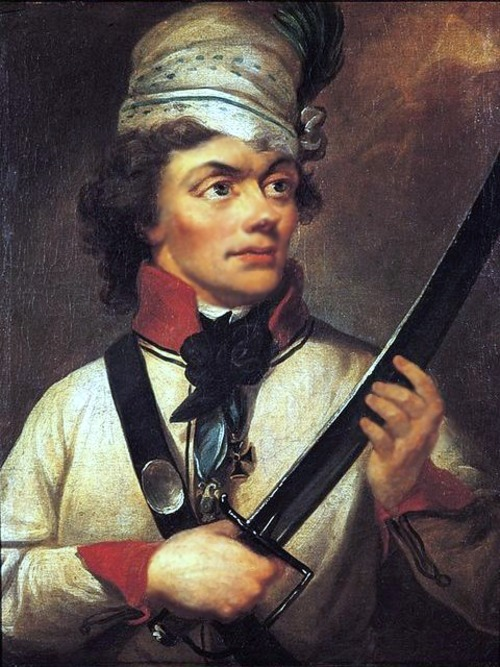
Tadeusz Kościuszko, member of the Corps' first class and its most famous alumnus

- Tadeusz Kościuszko
- Romuald Giedroyć
- Jakub Jasiński
- Hans Moritz Hauke
- Julian Ursyn Niemcewicz
- Karol Kniaziewicz
- Kazimierz Nestor Sapieha
- Józef Sowiński
- Rajmund Rembieliński

== See also ==
- Academy of National Defence
- Cadet Corps
- Cadet Corps (disambiguation)
