= Herb Hilgenberg =

Canadian meteorologist

Herb Hilgenberg (born 1937) is a Canadian amateur meteorologist and sailing enthusiast who provided a daily ship-routing/weather forecasting service for vessels at sea. Between 1987 and 2013, Hilgenberg provided this service free of charge via marine HF/SSB on a frequency of 12359.0 kHz starting at 2000 UTC.

Hilgenberg has assisted the Coast Guard during multiple search and rescue cases and is credited with saving several lives.

== History ==
Hilgenberg holds BASc and MBA degrees from the University of Toronto.

In 1982, Hilgenberg personally experienced bad weather at sea while sailing from New York to the Virgin Islands with his family. In response to the lack of information about weather on the ocean, Hilgenberg started to contact boats on the ocean and update them with weather forecasts and routing suggestions. He provided his service to approximately 50 vessels a day, seven days a week, operating first from his home in Bermuda, and then from Burlington, Ontario, Canada, beginning in 1994.

In 2013, after 25 years of operation, 76-year old Hilgenberg retired and subsequently closed his forecasting service.

== Awards ==
Hilgenberg was awarded the Queen's Golden Jubilee Medal in 2002. In 2013, he received the Meritorious Public Service Award from the United States Coast Guard.
