= California Maritime Academy Corps of Cadets =

Undergraduate student body in Vallejo, CA, U.S.

Coordinates: 38°4′10″N 122°13′47″W

- Former name: California Nautical School (1929–39)
- Motto: Laborare Pugnare Parati Sumus (Latin)
- Motto in English: To Work or Fight; We are Ready
- Type: Public university
- Established: 1929
- Affiliations: California State University system
- Endowment: $7.1 million (2016)
- President: RADM Thomas Cropper
- Students: 1,046 (Fall 2013)
- Undergraduates: 1,045 (Fall 2013)
- Postgraduates: 29 (Fall 2013)
- Location: Vallejo, California, United States
- Campus: 89 acres
- Mascot: Keelhaulers
- Website: https://www.cmacorps.org
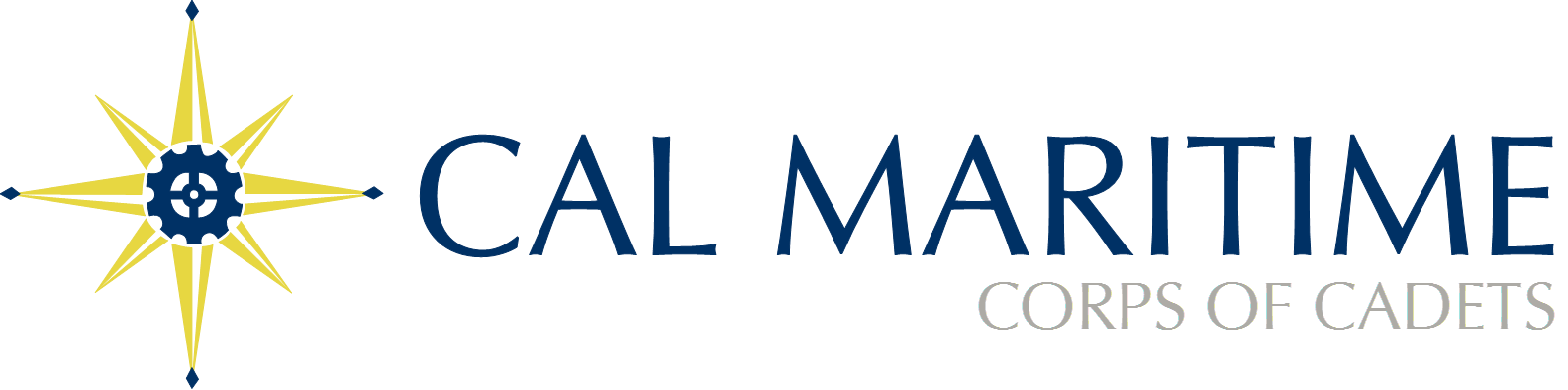
- Corps of Cadets Logp

The California Maritime Academy Corps of Cadets is the undergraduate student body at the California Maritime Academy. As a State Maritime Academy, as required by Title 46 Part 310 of the Code of Federal Regulations students are considered Cadets, required to wear uniforms, and utilize a demerit-based disciplinary system. Participation in the Corps of Cadets is mandatory; participation in the Navy Reserve Merchant Marine program is optional. Cadets still utilize Merchant Marine Navy-style uniforms, customs, and traditions. Based on academic majors cadets are organized into Squads, Sections, Divisions and Companies which regularly muster in Morning Formations multiple times a week, as well as stand watches on campus and aboard the training ship.

== Overview ==
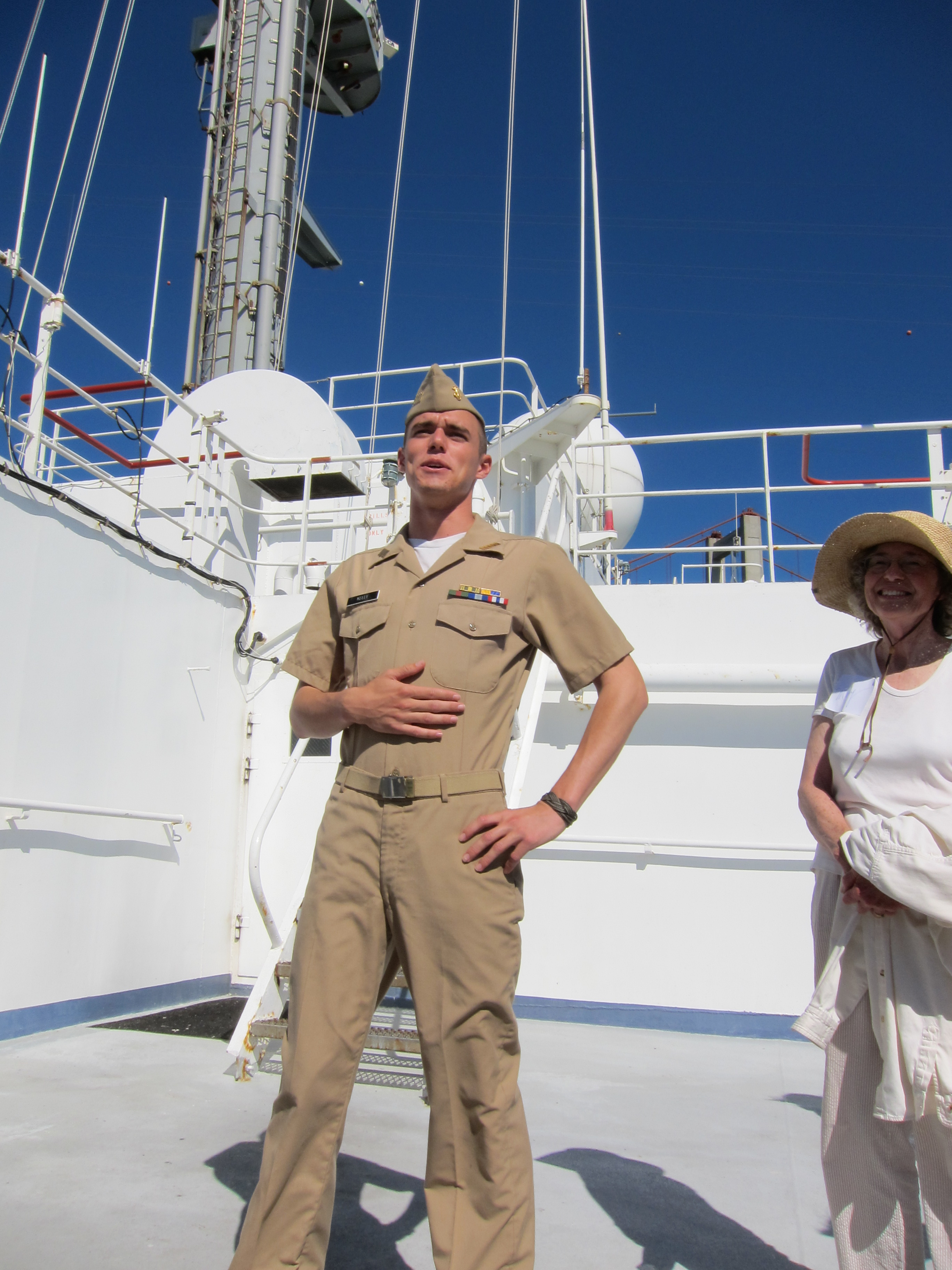
A Cadet wearing the Khaki Service Uniform while aboard the Training Ship Golden Bear

All undergraduate students at the California Maritime Academy are required to participate in the Corps of Cadets. This requirement comes from the Title 46 Part 310 of the Code of Federal Regulations which requires all cadets who are pursuing licensing as a deck or engineering officer in the United States Merchant Marine to participate in a cadet program.

=== Military options ===
There is no armed service obligation attached to graduation from the California Maritime Academy. However, financial aid and additional career opportunities exist for those students who choose to participate in any of the several military programs available on the CMA campus:

- Coast Guard – Auxiliary University Program, Maritime Academy Graduate Program
- Navy / Merchant Marine – Strategic Sealift Officer Program
- Navy – Reserve Officer Training Corps
- Marine Corps – Reserve Officer Training Corps
- Air Force - Reserve Officer Training Corps

== History ==
The California Nautical School was established in 1929, when California State Assembly Bill No. 253 was signed into law by Governor C. C. Young. The bill authorized the creation of the school, the appointment of a Board of Governors to manage the school and the acquisition of a training vessel. The school's mission was "to give practical and theoretical instruction in navigation, seamanship, steam engines, gas engines, and electricity in order to prepare young men to serve as officers in the American Merchant Marine." By 1930, a training vessel and a school site was acquired; the original location of what would become California Maritime Academy was California City (now Tiburon, California) in the San Francisco Bay Area. This established the Corps of Cadets at the California Maritime Academy.

In January 1990 RADM John J. Ekelund, then president, resigned amidst allegations of mistreatment of the academy's first female cadets. This led to a gradual elimination of military regimentation of cadets' life and training, as well as leading to becoming part of the California State University System. After becoming a campus of the California State University system, mandatory participation in the Navy Reserve Merchant Marine was eliminated with the introduction of academic majors that were not focused on becoming a licensed Merchant Marine or Reserve Naval Officer.

== Organization ==
The California Maritime Academy Corps of Cadets is a cadet-run organization, consisting of over 1000 members, modeled after the Naval Regiment of Midshipmen. The Corps of Cadets is supervised by the Office of Leadership Development who establish baseline regulations for the running of the Corps of Cadets. The day-to-day activities, such as formations and watchstanding are run primarily by the cadets.

=== Office of Leadership Development ===
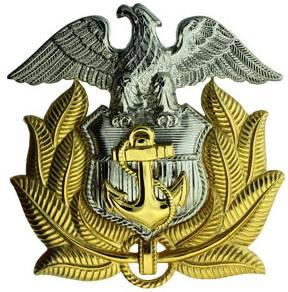
United States Maritime Service cap Insignia

The Office of Leadership Development is commandant of cadets, who is appointed by California Maritime Academy and is a paid staff and faculty member. The commandant is typically a retired senior officer from a maritime service, either the Navy, Marines, or Coast Guard.

The commandant is assisted by a company commandant, who oversees the cadet companies, and one lead company commandant for leader development. There is also an administrative support staff. In the past, the commandant staff had chief petty officers who mentored cadets on professional development and responsibility.

The campus president, commandants, company commandants, commanding officer of the training ship, licensed faculty, and training ship staff, many of whom are commissioned officers of the United States Maritime Service, also wear the Merchant Marine uniforms to set the standard for cadets to look up to, as well as develop cadets' leadership and professional abilities.

==== Partial list of commandants of cadets ====
Portrait	Rank	Name	Service	Year(s)
	CDR	J. L. Yount	USCG	2004-2008
	CAPT	R. W. DeStafney	USMC	2008-2010
	CAPT	D. E. Buckey	USN	2010–2014
	CAPT	R. E. Brogan	USCG	2014–2015
	CDR	J. A. Allen	USCG	2015–2015
	CDR	M. A. Monti	USN	2016-2017
	MCPON	Joe Campa	USN	2017-2018
	CAPT	David Taliaferro	USA	2018-Present

=== Corps of Cadets ===
The California Maritime Academy Corps of Cadets is organized on the level of a Naval Regiment of Midshipmen. The same uniforms and insignia are used, with the exception of using the title of the rank. The following is the structure as of the 2014-2015 Academic Year:

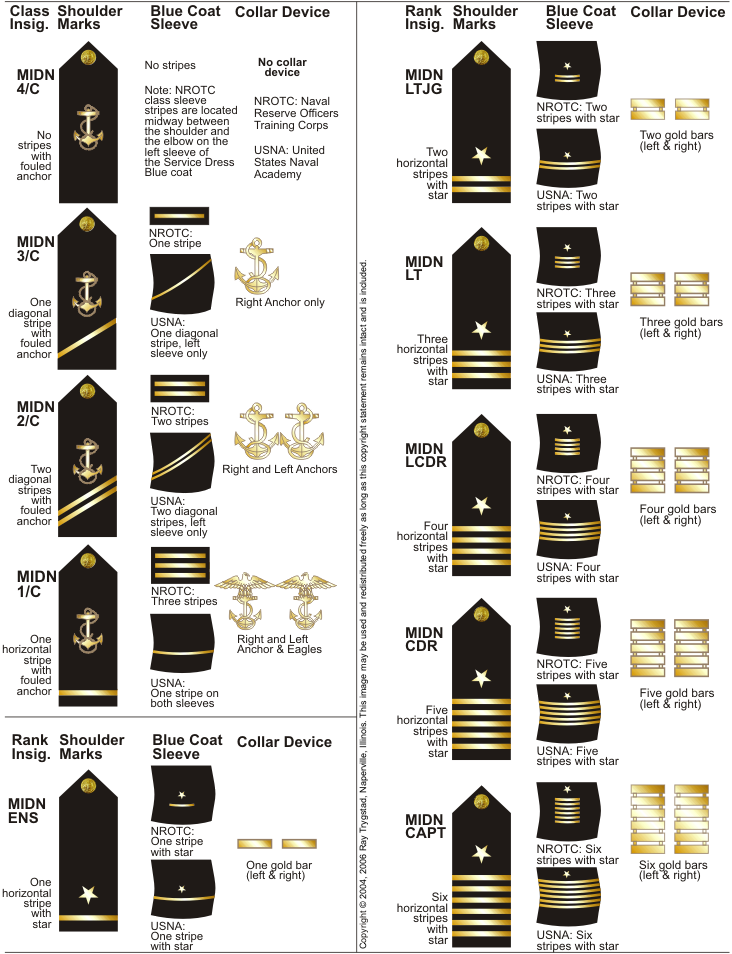
Rank Structure

Corps Executive Staff

- Corps Commander (6 Gold Bars)
  - Corps [Executive Officer] (5 Gold Bars)
  - Corps [Chief of Staff] (5 Gold Bars)
  - Academic Training Officer (5 Gold Bars)
  - Corps Information & Technology Officer (5 Gold Bars)
- ASCMA President (6 Gold Bars)
- Senior Hall Director (6 Gold Bars)

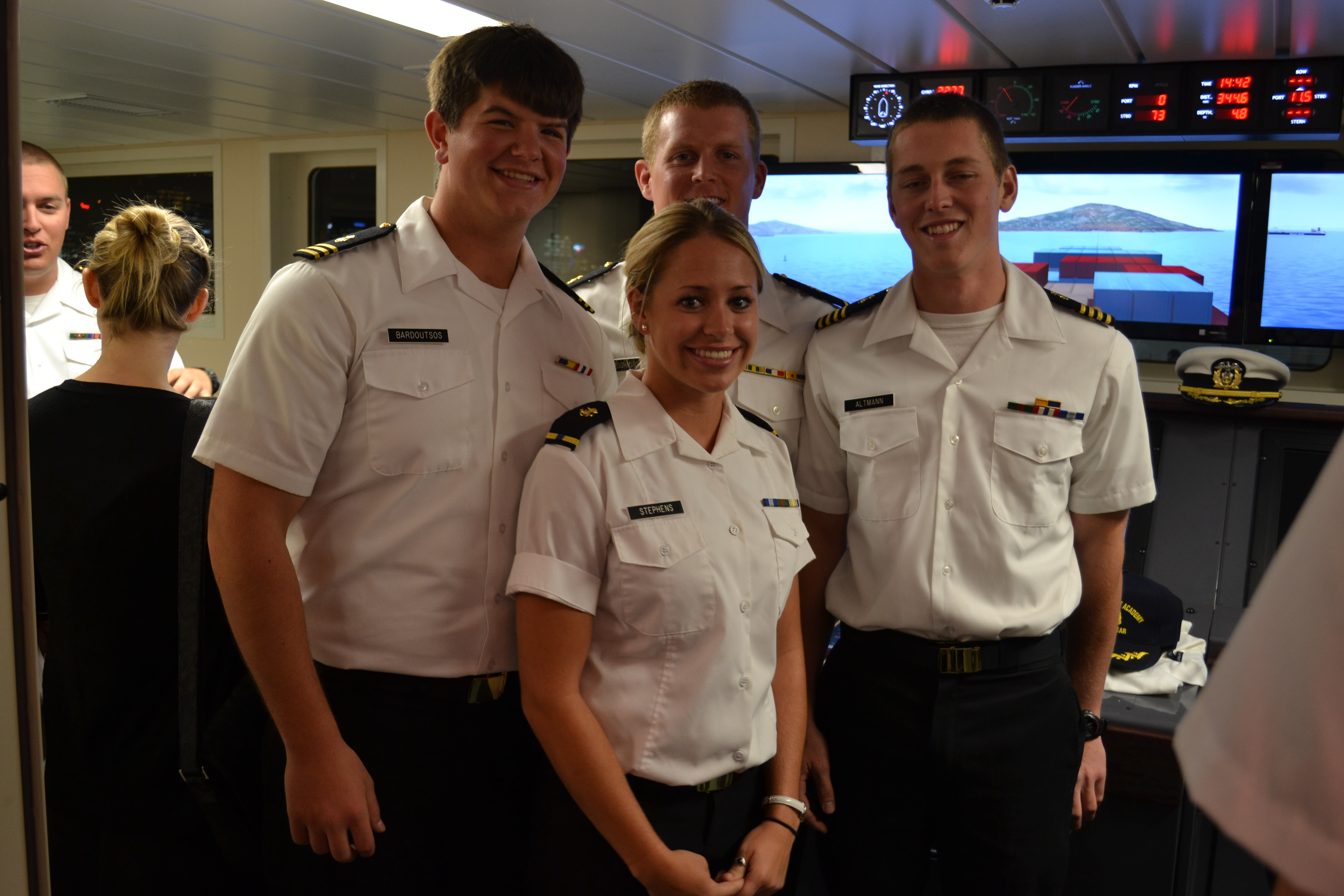
Cadets wearing the "Salt and Pepper" uniform. Rank or class standing is indicated by the shoulderboards.

Company Staff

- Company Commanding Officer (5 Gold Bars)
- Company Chief (5 Gold Bars)
  - Company Executive Officer (4 Gold Bars)
  - Company 1st Assistant/2nd Mate (4 Gold Bars)
  - Company 2nd Assistant/3rd Mate (3 Gold Bars)
  - Company 3rd Assistant (3 Gold Bars)

Division Staff

- Division Commanding Officer (4 Gold Bars)
  - Division Executive Officer (3 Gold Bars)
    - Division Officer (2 Gold Bars)
    - Section Leader (1 Gold Bars with Blue Breaks)
      - Squad leader (1 Gold Bar with Red Breaks)

All seniors not in an officer position wear the rank of cadet ensign (1 Gold Bar). Previously, underclassmen were considered equivalent to enlisted ranks, and depending on position wore insignia of a petty officer or chief petty officer. Currently, cadets in non-leadership positions wear sleeve striping and rank insignia that correspond to their academic class standing.

== Freshman training ==
Freshman cadets attend an orientation that familiarizes them with the campus layout and policies. Cadets are no longer required to undergo any training in drill or physical training. Cadets no longer learn marching, but still learn facing movements for Morning Formation and Colors.

== Cadet awards ==
Only awards received from California Maritime Academy, awards from another maritime academy if a transfer student, and awards from military service are worn on the uniform. Reserve Officer Training Corps, Civil Air Patrol, and other program awards are not allowed to be worn on the CMA cadet uniform. Following Navy Uniform regulations, ribbons are worn three to a row, with no spaces in between the rows.

=== Meritorious awards ===
- Meritorious Service Award
- Distinguished Cadet Award
- Cadet of the Month

=== Academic Awards ===
- President's List
- Dean's List

=== Training Awards ===
- GOLDEN BEAR Award
- Most Helpful Upper-Class Cadet Award
- Best Shipmate Award
- Gold Medal Leadership Award
- Cruise Award
- International Experience Award

=== Conduct Award ===
- Admiral's Leadership Award
- Good Conduct

=== Organizational Awards ===
- Corps Officer
- ASCMA Council
- Resident Assistant
- Section Leader/Squad Leader
- Varsity Letter
- Drill Team/Color Guard
- Community Emergency Response Team
- Community Service
- Cadet Ambassador Program

== Notable Alumni of the Corps of Cadets ==
Graduated Cadets who exemplified the Core Values through their meritorious service in a position of significant responsibility.

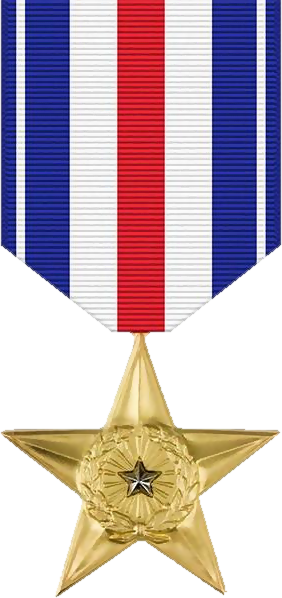
Silver Star Medal

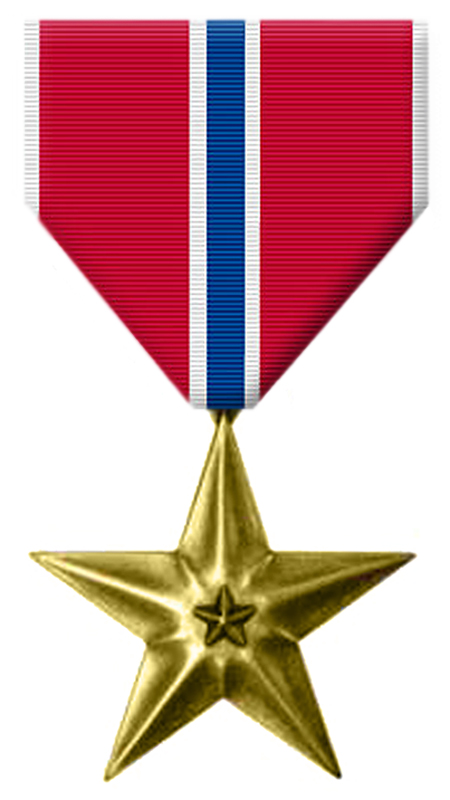
Bronze Star Medal

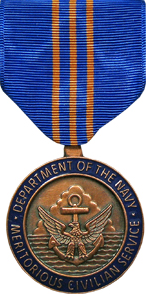
Navy Meritorious Civilian Service Award

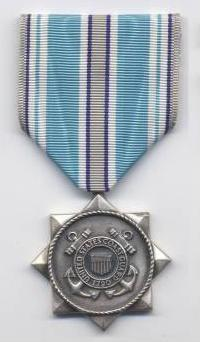
Meritorious Public Service Award
- Ensign Richard B. Wilkie (1939) died June 21, 1941, serving on the crew of USS Medusa until he became ill with tuberculosis of the spine. He was awarded the Merchant Marine Defense Bar and American Defense Service Medal.
- Ensign Henry D. McNabb, USN (1939) died September 9, 1943, killed by German artillery while serving on the crew of USS Arcturus. At the time he was operating LCM 15 in a four-man crew and five enlisted men. While assisting a British Landing Craft at Blue Beach, LCM 15 came under fire from a German 88 mm shore battery which killed Ensign McNabb and five of his men, wounding three of the other four men and sinking the LCM 15. He was posthumously awarded the Silver Star and Purple Heart for his actions. Firehouse #14 in Stockton, CA is on a street named for him.
- Chief Mate James M. Hendy, USMS (1941), died November 19, 1944, while serving on the crew of the Liberty Ship SS Gilbert Stuart. An enemy air attack killed five crew members and one navy gunner. Based on his Merchant Marine Service he is eligible for the Merchant Marine Mariner's Medal, Merchant Marine Combat Bar with star, Merchant Marine Atlantic War Zone Medal, Merchant Marine Pacific War Zone Medal and the Merchant Marine World War II Victory Medal.
- Captain John Clague, USN (1940) while serving on the crew of the USS Hamilton, received the Bronze Star for service in the liberation of the Philippines.
- Captain Noel V. Bird, USN (1939) served aboard two Attack Transports and was involved in fourteen amphibious landings in North Africa and throughout the Pacific during World War II.
- Captain Edward Franklin, USCG (1940) served in the Merchant Marine Service commanding the Liberty Ship SS Bret Harte. Later commissioned in the Coast Guard where he was awarded the Bronze Star and Republic of Vietnam Gallantry Cross.
- Captain Joey W. Hegeman, USN (1956) served as the commanding officer of USS Umpqua, later in the Naval Intelligence, and finally in the Department of Defense Inspector General. He was awarded the Bronze Star with Combat V and the Defense Meritorious Service Medal.
- Commander Donald D. Bloom, USN (1955) served as a Naval Aviator on five different aircraft carriers, including executive officer of the USS Inchon and was awarded the Air Medal with Gold Star.
- Captain James Coleman, USNR (1955-E) served as an engineering duty officer, ship superintendent at the Charleston Naval Shipyard and then as an engineering officer on the USS Boston. He was later the program engineer for Polaris Class submarines, Submarine Safety Program, the Board of Inspection and Survey, and a founding member of the Navy's Environmental Protection Program. His last assignment was as program manager of the Navy's Submarine Maintenance and Material Management Office of the Naval Sea Systems Command. He received the Navy's Meritorious Civilian Service Award.
- Third Mate Sam A. Bondy, Jr. (67-D), serving on S.S. Badger State Ammunition ship under contract to the Military Sea Transportation Service was killed on December 26, 1969, when an explosion occurred while en route to Vietnam. The crew was forced to abandon ship in a gale, and the liferaft capsized.
- Staff Sergeant Cassell J. Wiggins, USMC (alumnus) served in Iraq and Afghanistan as an explosive ordnance disposal technician, and was awarded the Bronze Star with Combat V for actions after his convoy was ambushed. He exposed himself to enemy fire to clear a path to attend the wounded Marines.
- Commander Albert S. McLemore, USN (1949-E), commanding officer of the USS Frank E. Evans that was lost in a collision. He was tried at court-martial for "hazarding a vessel" but acquitted.
- Captain John Bloomingdale (1989-MT) on the Matson container ship Manukai was awarded the Coast Guard Meritorious Public Service Award for the rescue of three men from a sailboat caught in Hurricane Julio 414 miles northeast of Oahu, Aug. 10, 2014.
- Third Mate Justin Moore (2013-MT) on the Matson container ship Manukai was awarded the Coast Guard Meritorious Public Service Award for the rescue of three men from a sailboat caught in Hurricane Julio 414 miles northeast of Oahu, Aug. 10, 2014.
- Captain Kate McCue (2000-BA) First American female mega cruise ship captain with Celebrity Cruises.
- Vice Admiral Daniel W. Dwyer (1988-MT), serving as the commander of United States Second Fleet and Joint Force Command Norfolk since August 20, 2021.

== See also ==
- United States Maritime Administration
- United States service academies
- Maritime Academy
- United States Merchant Marine
- Senior Military College
- Texas A&M University Corps of Cadets
- Virginia Tech Corps of Cadets
