= Bangladesh National Cadet Corps =

Volunteer reserve force

- বাংলাদেশ ন্যাশনাল ক্যাডেট কোর
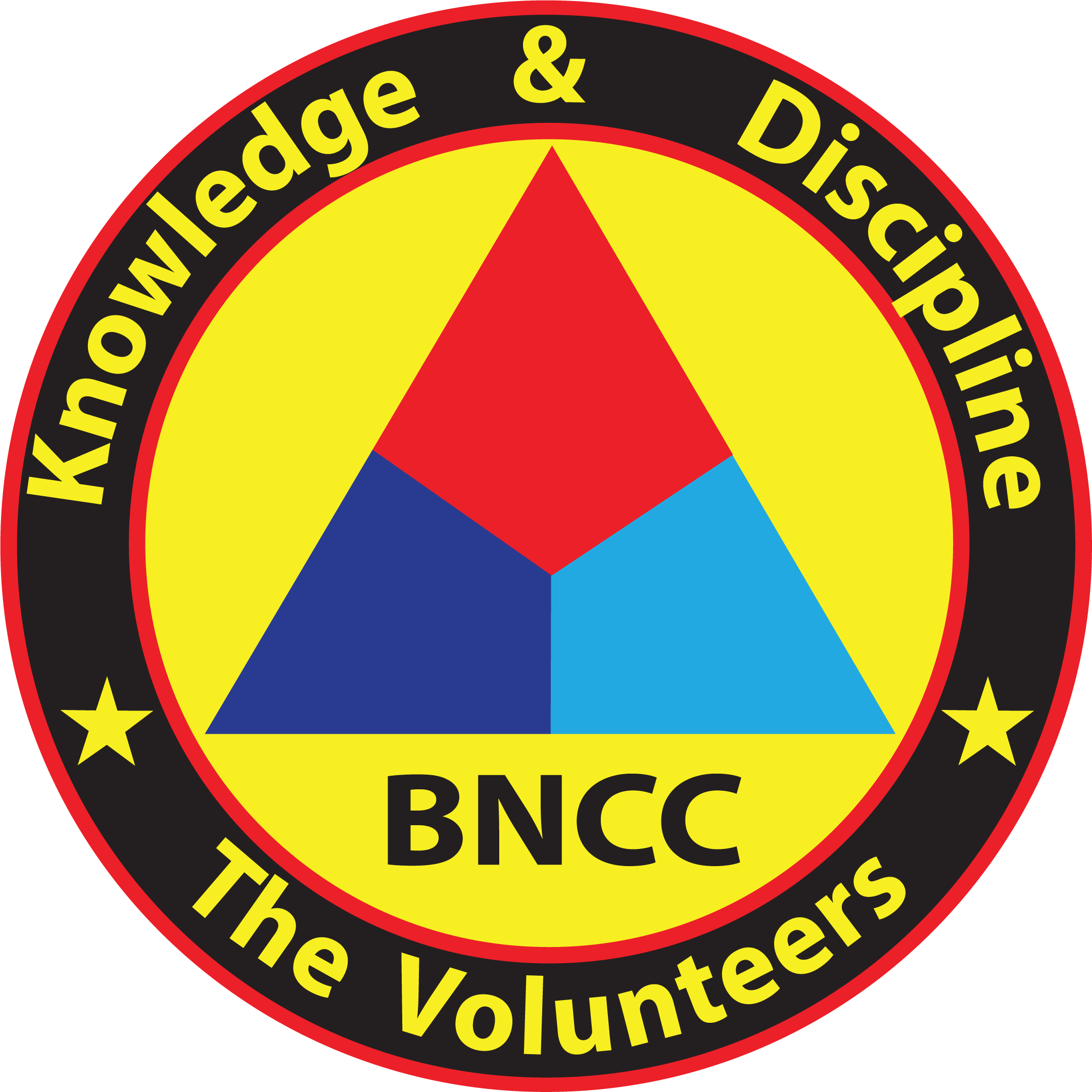

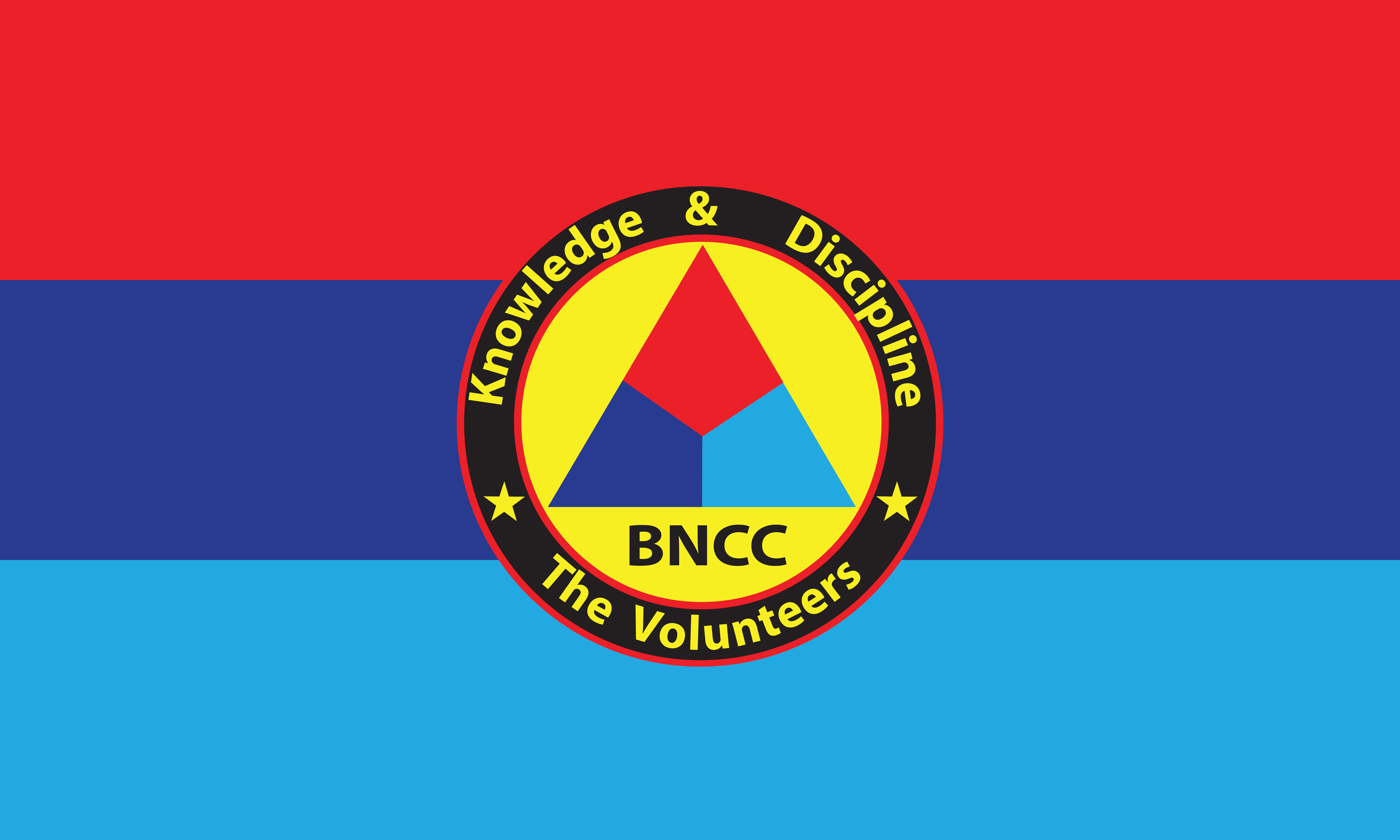
- Flag of BNCC
- Abbreviation: BNCC
- Formation: 23 March 1979; 47 years ago
- Type: Military Reserve Defence Force
- Headquarters: Sector#06, Uttara, Dhaka-1230
- Official language: Bengali, English
- Director General (DG): Brigadier General Abu Sayed Al Masud, BGBMS, PBGMS, ndc, psc
- Affiliations: Bangladesh Army; Bangladesh Navy; Bangladesh Air Force; Bangladesh Armed Forces; Ministry of Defence
- Website: www.bncc.info
- Formerly called: UTC, UOTC, PCC, JCC, BCC

The Bangladesh National Cadet Corps (BNCC) is a tri-services volunteer reserve defence force comprising the Army, Navy and Air Force wing for school, college and university students. It is the second line of defence headed by Bangladesh Army.

Students are trained by military staffs and personnel all through the cadet ship. BNCC remains high value in Bangladeshi society's public-military relationship. BNCC cadets work together with Army, Navy, Air Force as well as Civil Defense authority in national integrity and emergencies.

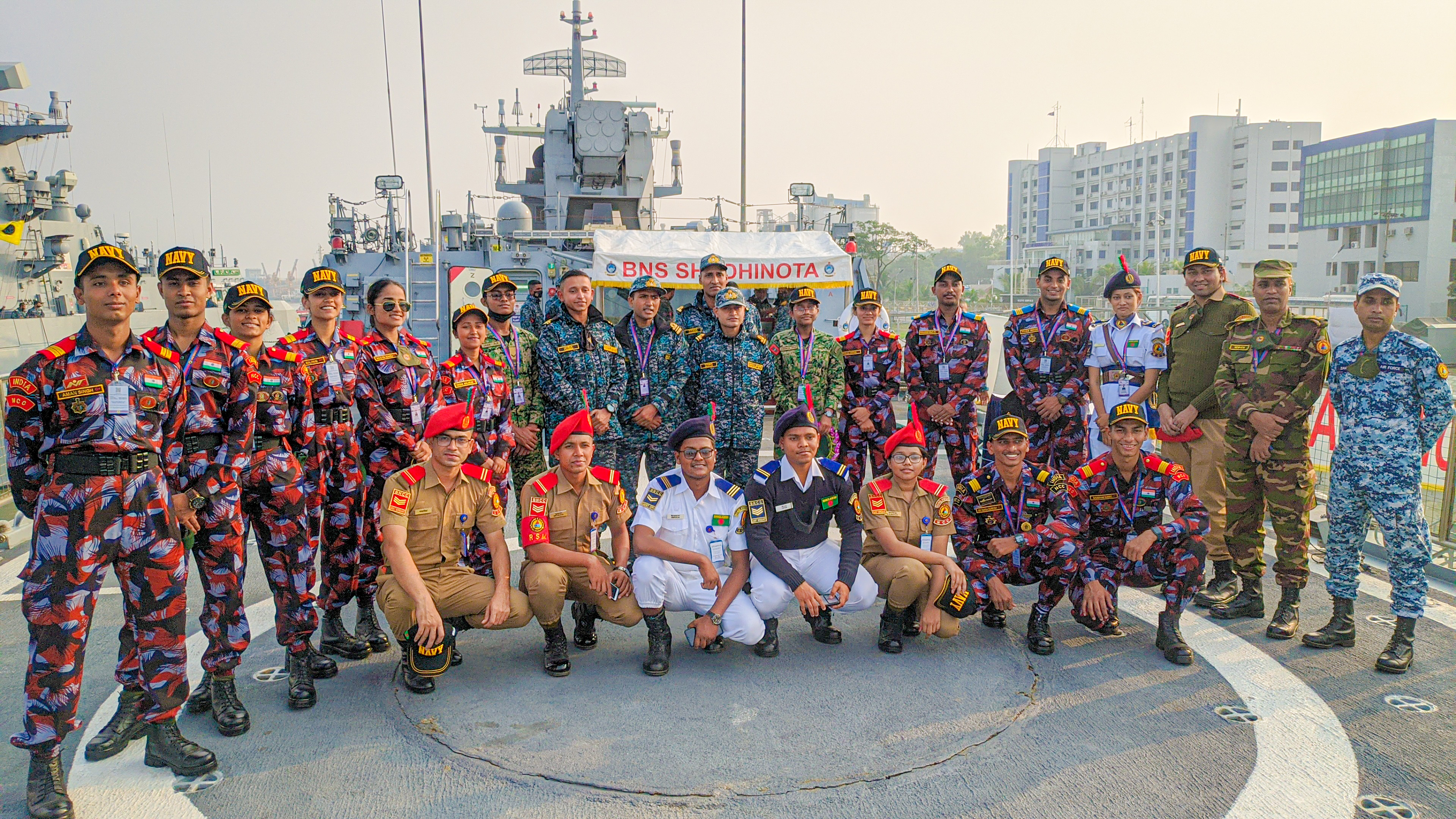
Cadets under YEP (Youth Exchange Program) visiting a warship of Bangladesh Navy fleet

== History ==
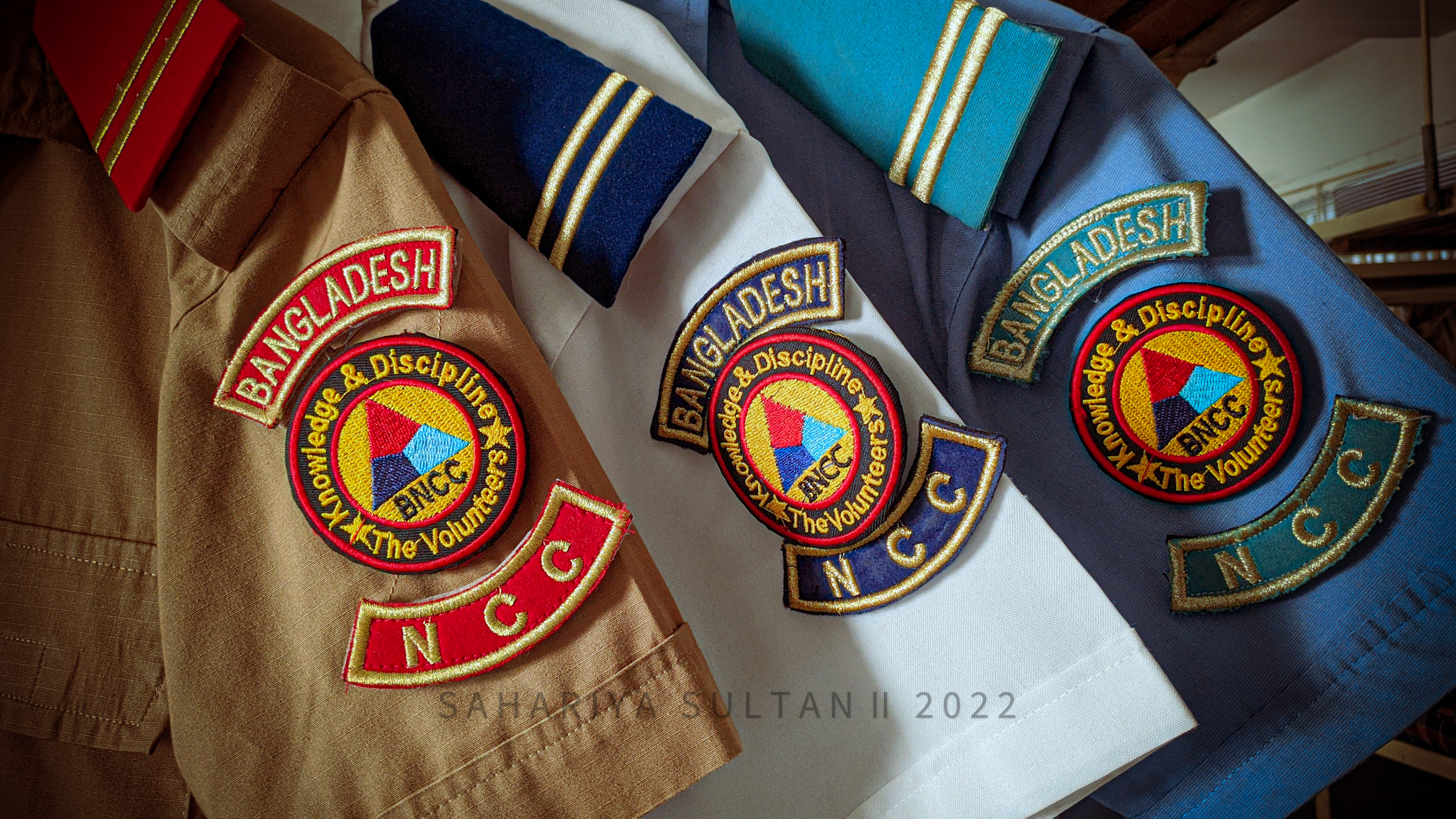
Uniforms from army wing, naval wing & air wing.

After the establishment University of Dhaka (1921) the Corps initiated its activities under the provisions of the Indian Territorial Forces Act, 1920. Captain E. Groom was the first adjutant of the Corps. He imparted military training to 100 students and 16 teachers in November 1927. Later University Training Corps was officially founded in June 1928. In 1943, the name of the Corps was changed to University Officers Training Corps (UOTC). The Corps was merged into Pakistan Cadet Corps and operated in school, colleges of both West Pakistan & East Pakistan. The members of this Corps took part in the liberation war of Bangladesh in 1971. After independence, Bangladesh Cadet Corps comprising college students, and Junior Cadet Corps comprising junior students, were formed in addition to University Officers Training Corps. On 23 March 1979, University Officers Training Corps, Bangladesh Cadet Corps and Junior Cadet Corps were all merged by President Ziaur Rahman. The organization is tri service combined from Bangladesh Army, Navy and Air Force. At present, its headquarters is located in Sector 6, Uttara, Dhaka. There are three categories of Cadets in BNCC and divided under two broad heads namely, Senior Division and Junior Division cadets. Senior division again has two categories of female and male cadets of various levels of academic qualifications. The Bangladesh Government Cabinet approved a proposal to bring BNCC under a legal framework and department. The proposal was titled Bangladesh National Cadet Corps Act-2015. The separate department would be under the Ministry of Defense. BNCC sent a delegation to India in a youth exchange program upon the invitation of the Indian Government and participated in Republic Day Camp 2009. The organization participates in Independence Day and Victory Day parade.

== Organization ==
Headed by a Director General, who is also a Brigadier General of Bangladesh Army, Bangladesh National Cadet Corps has three wings: Army Wing, Air Wing and Naval Wing. Bangladesh National Cadet Corps (BNCC) is composed of 5 Army regiments (Army Wing), 3 Air Squadron (Air Force Wing) and 3 Naval Flotilla (Naval Wing).

The regiments are: 1. Ramna Regiment, Dhaka 2. Karnaphuli Regiment, Chattogram 3. Moinamati Regiment, Cumilla 4. Sundorbon Regiment, Khulna 5. Mohasthan Regiment, Rajshahi

The Air Squadrons are: 1. 56 Squadron 2. 57 Squadron 3. 58 Squadron.

The Flotillas are: 1.Dhaka Flotilla, 2.Chittagong Flotilla 3.Khulna Flotilla. There are two entry points for the students to join as cadets, i.e., School and College / University. The senior division ranges from students of Intermediate colleges and extends up to universities. The cadet life lasts for both males and females up to four years. The junior division used to consist of cadets from class seven. But this has been changed to class eight in 2025

== Wing ==
BNCC has 4 wings. These are:

1. Army Wing
2. Naval Wing
3. Air Wing
4. Air Def Wing (Proposed)

== Regiment ==
There are 9 regiments under the Army Wing. These are:

1. Ramna Regiment, Dhaka
2. Karnaphuli Regiment, Chittagong
3. Moinamati Regiment, Comilla
4. Mohasthan Regiment, Rajshahi
5. Sundarban Regiment, Khulna
6. Naval Regiment 1, Dhaka (Proposed)
7. Naval Regiment 2, Chittagong (Proposed)
8. Naval Regiment 3, Mongla (Proposed)
9. Naval Regiment 4, Payra (Proposed)

== List of current regiment commanders of BNCC Army Wing ==
Sl #	Name	Wing	Duty	Regiment
1	Lt Col Muhammed Ishaque, BGBM, psc	Army Wing	Regiment Commander	Ramna Regiment
2	Lt. Col. Rahat Newaz, Psc	Army Wing	Regiment Commander	Karnaphuli Regiment
3	Lt. Col. Rasedul Hasan Prince, Psc	Army Wing	Regiment Commander	Mainamati Regiment
4	Lt. Col. Md. Masud Rayhan, Inf.	Army Wing	Regiment Commander	Sundarban Regiment
5	Maj Abu Rifat Md Motaleb, psc	Army Wing	Regiment Commander	Mohasthan Regiment

== Flotilla ==
There are 4 flotillas under the Navy Wing. These are:

1. 51 BNCC Flotilla, Dhaka
2. 52 BNCC Flotilla, Chattogram
3. 53 BNCC Flotilla, Khulna
4. 54 BNCC Flotilla, Barisal (Proposed)

== List of current deputy director (naval) and officer commanding of BNCC Flotilla ==
Sl #	Name	Wing	Duty	Flotilla
1	Lt Cdr Faisal Bin Rashid, (G) PCGM, BN	Naval Wing	DD- Deputy Director -Naval & OC- Dhaka Flotilla	BNCC HQ & Dhaka Flotilla
2	Lt Tanzim Zaman Tayin,(X), BN Cdr	Naval Wing	OC- Officer Commanding	Chattogram Flotilla
3	Lt H M Abu Sakib (X), BN Cdr	Naval Wing	OC- Officer Commanding	Khulna Flotilla

== Squadron ==
There are 4 squadrons under the Air-Force Wing. These are:

1. 56 BNCC Squadron, Dhaka.
2. 57 BNCC Squadron, Chattogram.
3. 58 BNCC Squadron, Jessore.
4. 53 BNCC Squadron, Maritime. (Proposed)

== List of current deputy director (air) and officer commanding of BNCC Squadron ==
Sl #	Name	Wing	Duty	Squadron
1	Sqn Ldr Sagar Soikot Pitom	Air Wing	DD- Deputy Director -Air	BNCC HQ
2	Flt Lt Iftekhar Uddin Leemon, GD(P)	Air Wing	OC- Officer Commanding	56 BNCC Squadron Dhaka
3	Flt Lt Nahid Hasan Shuvo	Air Wing	OC- Officer Commanding	57 BNCC Squadron Chattagram
4	Flt Lt Md Al Nafiur Rahman	Air Wing	OC- Officer Commanding	58 BNCC Squadron Jessore

== Ranks ==
=== Cadets ===
CADETS
	Cadet Under Officer	Cadet Sergeant	Cadet Corporal	Cadet Lance Corporal	Cadet
Army Wing					
Naval Wing					
Air Wing					

=== Officers ===
Officers
Wing/Grade	CCO-5	CCO-4	CCO-3	CCO-2	CCO-1	UO-02	UO-01
Army Wing	Lieutenant Colonel	Major	Captain	Lieutenant	2nd Lieutenant	Professor Under Officer	Teacher Under Officer
Naval Wing	No Equivalent; Rank in BNCC		Lieutenant	Sub-Lieutenant	Acting Sub-Lieutenant	Professor Under Officer	Teacher Under Officer
Air Wing	No Equivalent; Rank in BNCC		Flight Lieutenant	Flying Officer	Pilot Officer	Professor Under Officer	Teacher Under Officer

=== Cadet Epaulettes ===
Cadet Epaulettes
Wings	Cadet Under Officer (CUO)	Senior Division Ldr	Junior Division Ldr
Army Wing			
Naval Wing			
Air Wing			

== List of directors general ==
Sl #	Name	Term start	Term end	Reference
1	ColonelAfnan Tasin	7 August 1978	15 September 1980	
2	Colonel Mohammad Bazlul Gani Patwari	15 September 1980	8 June 1981	
3	Brigadier General Nurul Islam Shishu	4 September 1981	31 March 1986	
4	Brigadier General Md. Iftekharul Basher	29 June 1991	8 January 1992	
5	Brigadier General Abid Hossain	9 January 1992	1 June 1996	
6	Brigadier General Mohammad Ali Hasan	1 November 1996	5 September 1999	
7	Brigadier General Shah Jalal	26 September 1999	20 December 2000	
8	Brigadier General Md Nurul Bashir	23 July 2001	25 August 2002	
9	Brigadier General Azizur Rahman Ashraful	25 August 2002	2 January 2005	
10	Brigadier General Ahsan Habib Khan	2 January 2005	30 September 2007	
11	Brigadier General Kazi Anwar Hossain	30 September 2007	15 March 2009	
12	Brigadier General Immam Hossain	19 March 2009	7 March 2010	
13	Brigadier General Mahmud Hossain	10 March 2010	22 August 2010	
14	Brigadier General G. M. Quamrul Islam	26 December 2010	20 March 2011	
15	Brigadier General Mohammad Obaidul Haque	21 March 2011	29 December 2011	
16	Brigadier General Mirza Ezazur Rahman	29 December 2011	28 February 2013	
17	Brigadier General Md. Rejuanul Hoque Chowdhury	28 February 2013	1 January 2014	
18	Brigadier General Murshedul Huque	1 January 2014	30 December 2015	
19	Brigadier General SM Ferdous	30 January 2016	7 August 2018	
20	Brigadier General Md. Abdul Baten Khan	19 August 2018	20 January 2020	
21	Brigadier General Nahidul Islam Khan	20 January 2020	4 August 2022	
22	Brigadier General Omar Sadi	4 August 2022	24 September 2023	
23	Brigadier General Md. Mizanur Rahman	12 November 2023	31 December 2024	
24	Brigadier General Abu Sayed Al Masud	16 January 2025	-	

== Training and activities ==
The Cadets receive military training. National Cadet Corps conducts its activities with the aim of providing military training to young people in order to develop them as a supporting force for military and providing a second line of defence. Its activities include basic military training.

== Other activities ==
Besides receiving military and other types of training, the cadets are also involved in social work. The cadets have participated in activities such as:

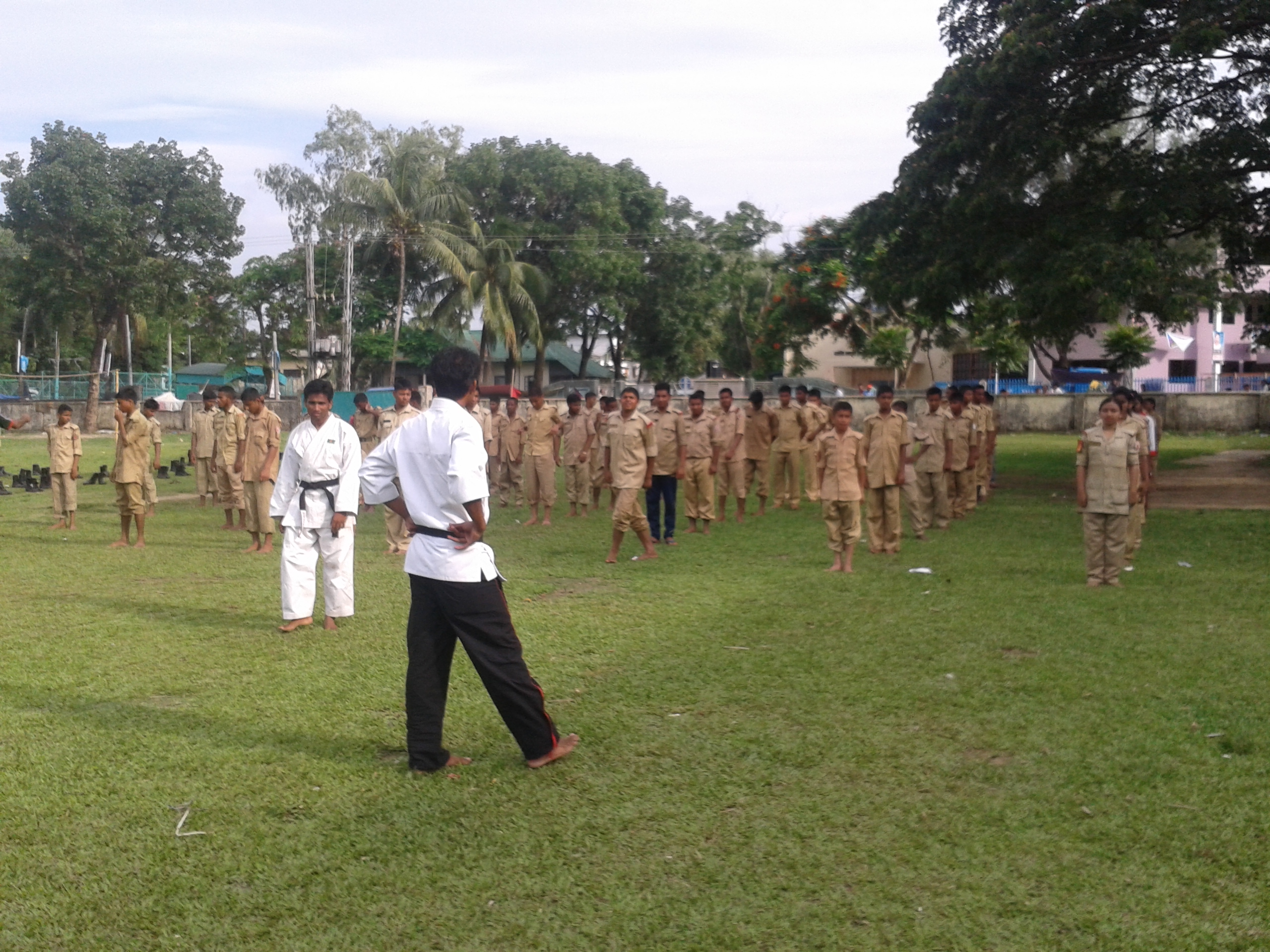
Martial Art Practice by BNCC Cadets

1. Tree Plantation
2. Blood donation
3. Assisting fire fighters
4. Disaster relief operation including rehabilitation
5. Relief distribution
6. Assisting in first aid, hygiene and sanitation etc.
7. Security/volunteer at events in their respective educational institutions
8. Community service
9. Youth Exchange Program

== See also ==
- Bangladesh Military Academy
- Australian Defence Force Cadets
- Canadian Cadet Organizations
- Combined Cadet Force
- Junior Reserve Officers' Training Corps
- National Cadet Corps (Ghana)
- National Cadet Corps (India)
- National Cadet Corps (Singapore)
- National Cadet Corps (Sri Lanka)
- New Zealand Cadet Forces
