= National Cadet Corps (Ghana) =

National Cadet Corps Ghana
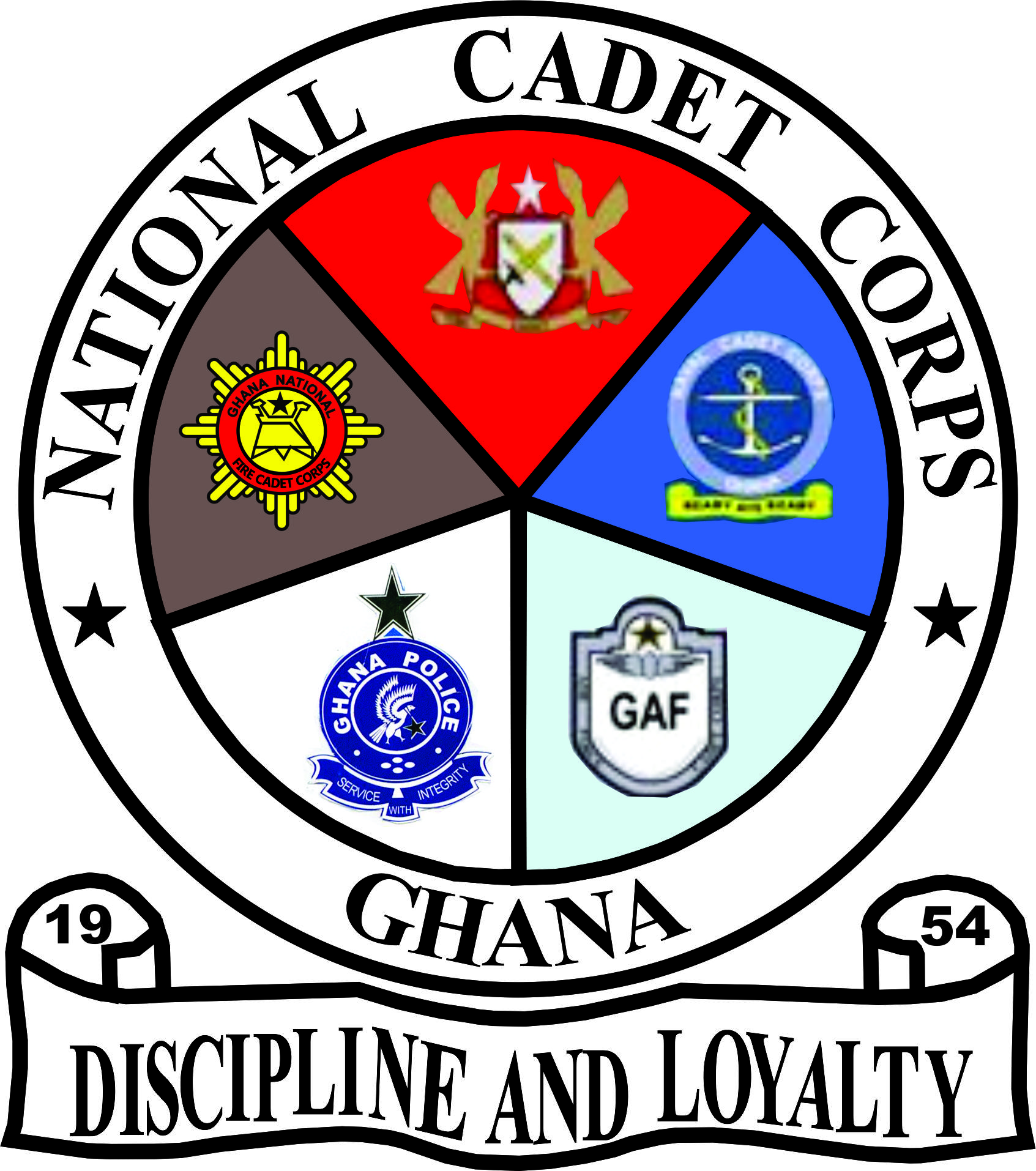
- Active: 1954 - present Current form: 2002 – present
- Role: Military Trainee Uniformed Group
- Size: 13,380+
- Headquarters: Ghana Literacy House, Accra
- Mottos: Discipline and Loyalty
- Website: https://cadetcorps.gov.gh

Commanders
- Executive Director: Co-ordinator General Nicholas Nii Tettey-Amarteifio

The National Cadet Corps Ghana (NCCG) of Ghana is an amalgamation of Army (GA), Navy (GN), Air Force (GHF), Police (GPS) and the Fire (GNFRS) Cadets in Ghana.

It came into establishment in 1954 under the ministry of education, with its current form and organization being establish in 2002, under the Ministry of Youth and Sports.

== National Coordinator General ==
- Mr. Nicholas Nii Tettey-Amarteifio – National Cadet Coordinator General, Coordinator of the National Cadet Corps, Ghana
- Derek Clottey – Chief Staff Officer,
- Three Sector Co-ordinators
- Sixteen Regional Co-ordinators

== History ==
The Cadet Corps of Ghana, was first established in 1954 at the Ghana Secondary Technical School (GSTS), Takoradi in the Western Region (with just a handful of student cadet). Currently the Corps has membership school strength of about 223 and a numerical strength of about 65,380 in all ten regions of Ghana.

== Structure ==
The National Cadet Corps has the following as its command and administrative structures.

- His Excellency the President – Commandant In Chief of the Cadet Corps
- His Excellency the Vice President – Deputy Commandant In Chief of the Cadet Corps
- Minister of Youth and Sports – over seeing Ministry of the Cadet
- Ghana Education Service
- Ministry Chief Directors
- Cadet Headquarters
- Sectoral Headquarters
- Regional Headquarters
- District Headquarters
- Schools Cadet Corps

== Task/Appointment ==
The Adult Staff in an institution can be given the following appointments:

- OC [ Officer Commanding ] – Officer Commanding the school
- SUO [ Senior Under officer ] – Second In Command
- JUO [ Junior Under Officer ] – Adjutant

Cadets follow the below ranks:

Army	Air Force	Navy	Police	Fire
Cadet Warrant Officer Class I	Cadet Warrant Officer Class I	Cadet Chief Petty Officer	Cadet Regional Sergeant Major	Cadet Staff Firefighter Major
Cadet Warrant Officer Class II	Cadet Warrant Officer Class II		Cadet District Sergeant Major	
Cadet Staff Sergeant	Cadet Flight Sergeant	Cadet Petty Officer Class I		Cadet Staff Firefighter
Cadet Sergeant	Cadet Sergeant	Cadet Petty Officer Class II	Cadet Sergeant	Cadet Senior Firefighter
Cadet Corporal	Cadet Corporal	Cadet Leading Seaman	Cadet Corporal	Cadet Leading Firefighter
Cadet Lance Corporal	Cadet Leading Aircraftsman		Cadet Lance Corporal	
Cadet Private	Cadet Aircraftsman	Cadet Seaman	Cadet Private	Cadet Firefighter

== See also ==
- Military of Ghana
- Cadets (youth program)
