= Gibraltar Cadet Force =

Cadet force in Gibraltar

- Country: Gibraltar (United Kingdom)
- Role: Volunteer Youth Organisation British Army
- Garrison/HQ: British Forces Gibraltar

Commanders
- Commandant: Maj Gen I. C. Dale CBE
- Colonel Cadets Gibraltar: King Charles III

The Gibraltar Cadet Force (to be renamed The Royal Gibraltar Regiment Army Cadet Force in 2024) is a youth organisation that provides military training for secondary school-aged children in the British Overseas Territory and former Imperial fortress of Gibraltar.

== Commandants ==
- Colonel M. Newman MBE DL (2010–2023)
- Major General I. C. Dale CBE (2023–present)
