= Gibraltar Air Cadets =

Gibraltar Air Cadets (officially No.2 Overseas (Gibraltar) Squadron) is an Air Training Corps unit in the British Overseas Territory of Gibraltar. The squadron was founded in 1985. The Gibraltar Air Cadets are an active squadron and presents as the second overseas unit, participating under the Norfolk and Suffolk Wing. Their activities include: Flying and Gliding, Duke of Edinburgh Award Scheme, BTEC Diplomas, Annual UK Camps, Fieldcraft Training, First Aid Training, Initiative Exercises, Sports, Flight Simulator, Shooting & much more.
