= Coast Guard Public Service Awards =

Military award of the United States Coast Guard

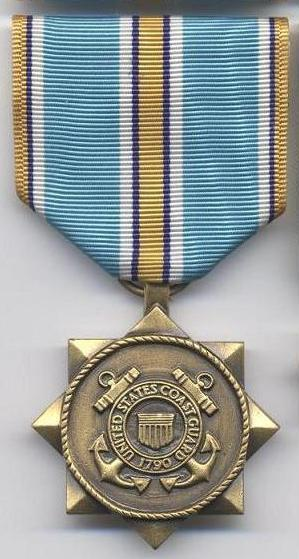
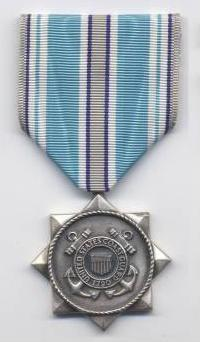
- Public Service Award Medals
- Awarded for: Direct contributions to the Coast Guard in helping carry out any of its roles/missions.
- Country: United States
- Presented by: United States Coast Guard
- Eligibility: Open
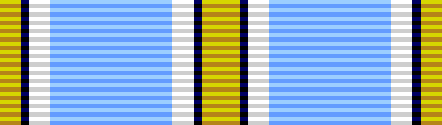
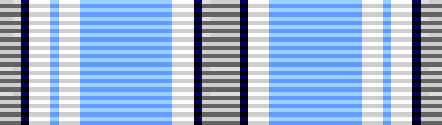
- Distinguished Public Service ribbon Meritorious Public Service ribbon

The United States Coast Guard maintains several civilian Public Service Awards to recognize private citizens, groups, or organizations for helping the Coast Guard carry out its missions. These awards are U.S. Government Awards issued by the Coast Guard, and like the Gold and Silver Lifesaving Medals, are not classified as military decorations, therefore, they may be awarded to any person.

== Awards ==
The Coast Guard civilian Public Service Awards include:

Distinguished Public Service Award - Aside from the Gold and Silver Life-Saving Medals, this is the highest public recognition that the Commandant of the Coast Guard may award. Distinguished Public Service Awards are given to recognize:

- Extraordinary heroism in advancing the Coast Guard's mission

- Exceptional coordination and/or cooperation in matters pertaining to the Coast Guard's responsibilities

- Personal and direct contribution to the Coast Guard that had a direct bearing on the accomplishment of the Coast Guard's responsibilities to its citizens

Meritorious Public Service Award - The second-highest Public Service Award is given to recognize:

- Unusual courage in advancing a Coast Guard mission

- Substantial contribution to the Coast Guard that produced tangible results

- Specific individual accomplishments that provide unique benefits to the public

Public Service Commendation - This award is intended primarily to recognize personal and beneficial contributions to the Coast Guard's responsibilities. Recipients are recognized for:

- Courage or initiative in advancing one or more Coast Guard missions

- Beneficial contribution in one mission area or a limited geographical area

Certificate of Merit - This award recognizes significant endeavors such as:

- Displaying initiative in advancing one or more of the Coast Guard's missions

- Significant effort that resulted in the completion of a project or program significantly beneficial to the Coast Guard's missions and responsibilities

Certificate of Appreciation - These certificates are presented to individuals or groups who have exhibited public-spirited efforts that benefit Coast Guard personnel or missions.

== See also ==
- Lifesaving Medal (Gold and Silver)
- Awards and decorations of the United States government
