= Anguilla Cadet Corps =

Cadet force in Anguilla

- Country: Anguilla (United Kingdom)
- Role: Volunteer Youth Organisation British Army

Commanders
- Ceremonial chief: King Charles III

The Anguilla Cadet Corps is a youth organisation that provides military training to school-aged children in the British Overseas Territory of Anguilla.
