= Cayman Islands Cadet Corps =

Youth organization

Commandant of the Cayman Islands Cadet Corps
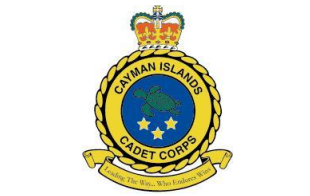

- The Cayman Flag is used by the Cayman Islands Cadet Corps as their Flag

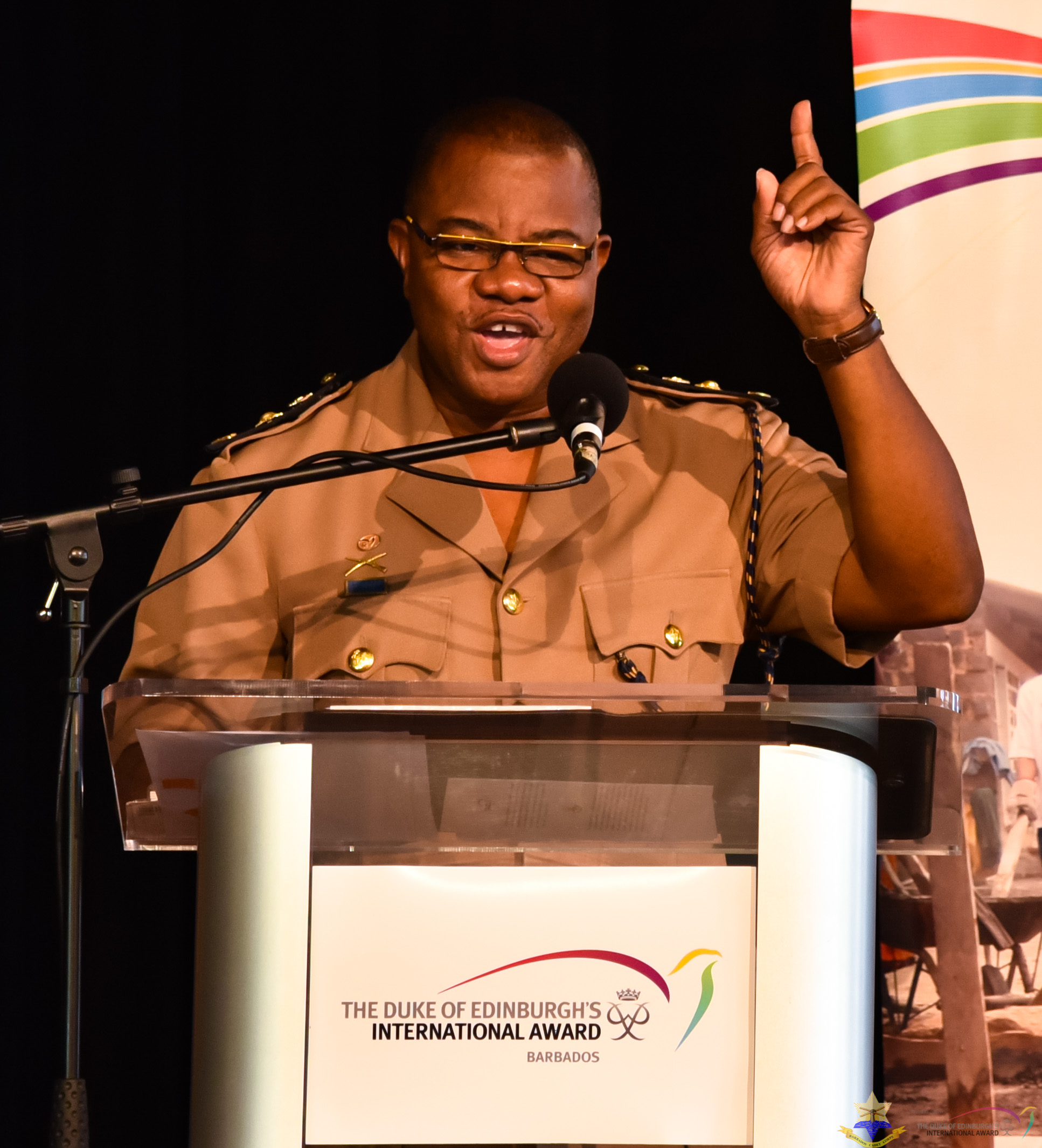
- Incumbent; COMDT. Col. Errol Brathwaite, CCM since April 14 2023
- Home Affairs
- Style: Colonel (Col)
- Member of: Caribbean Cadet Association
- Reports to: Deputy Governor
- Residence: Cayman Islands
- Appointer: Governor of the Cayman Islands with the advice of the Premier
- Formation: March 2002
- First holder: Comdt. Colonel (Col.) Philip Hyre (Ret)
- Deputy: DComdt. Major (Maj.) Halston Farley
- Website: gov.ky/web/mdaha/cadet-corps

The Cayman Islands Cadet Corps (CICC) is a youth organisation in the Cayman Islands for male and female secondary school students between ages 12 and 17. It was established in March 2002.

== Core subjects ==
- Drill and Turnout
- Military Knowledge
- Fieldcraft
- Skill at Arms
- Shooting
- Navigation
- Expedition Training
- First Aid
- Physical Training
- Cadets in the Community

== The Cayman Islands Cadet Corps Structure ==
The CICC is split into 6 detachments:

- John Gray Detachment - (Alpha)
- Clifton Hunter Detachment - (Bravo)
- Band Detachment - (Bravo)
- Cayman Brac Detachment - (Bravo)
- Triple C Detachment - (Alpha)
- Marine Detachment - (Alpha)

The main objectives of the CICC are defined in its Charter, Vision and the Mission Statement.

The Charter

The Cayman Island Cadet Corps is a National Voluntary Youth Organization. It is sponsored by the Governor's office and administered by a local headquarters led by the Commandant. The Cadet Corps were originally operated by the Ministry of Education with assistance from the RCIPS and provides military style, adventurous, and community activities. The Corps are currently under the Ministry of Health, Environment, Youth, Sports & Culture.

== List of Commandants and Deputy Commandants of the Cayman Islands Cadet Corps ==
- Commandant Col. Braithwaite (2022 – present)
  - Deputy Commandant Maj. Farley (2024 – present )
- Commandant Col. Braithwaite (2023 – present)
  - Acting Deputy Commandant Maj. Levy (2021 – 2023)
- Acting Commandant Lt. Col Braithwaite (2020 – 2023)
  - Acting Deputy Commandant Maj. Levy (2021 – 2023)
- Commandant Lt. Col O'Garro (2008 – 2021)
  - Deputy Commandant Lt. Col Braithwaite (2020 - 2021)
- Commandant Lt. Col O'Garro (2008 – 2021)
  - Deputy Commandant Maj. Henry (2017 - 2019)
- Acting Commandant Lt.Col O'Garro (2008 - 2013)
  - Deputy Commandant Maj. White (2008 - 2017)
- Commandant Col Philph Hyre (2002 - 2008)
  - Deputy Commandant Lt.Col O'Garro (2002 - 2008)

== List of Adjutant Training Officers of the Cayman Islands Cadet Corps ==
- Acting Training Coordinator - Maj. Farley (2023–present)
- Adjutant Training Officer - Maj. Levy (2015–2023)
- Adjutant Training Officer - Maj. Henry (2004- 2014)
- Adjutant Training Officer - Maj. White (2002-2004)

== List of Warrant Officers of the Cayman Islands Cadet Corps ==
- W01/RSM Clarke (2023–present)
- MCPO1/RSM Garraway (2019–2023)
- W01/RSM Farley (2010–2019)
- W01/RSM Larner (2005–2010)

=== Cadet ranks ===
As well as learning new skills by working through the APC syllabus, experienced cadets can be awarded a rank. As the Army allows its soldiers to take on responsibility and leadership as non-commissioned officers (NCOs), so too does the ACF.

Non-commissioned officers

Rank group	Senior NCOs				Junior NCOs		Enlisted
Cayman Islands Cadet Corps							No insignia
Cayman Islands Cadet Corps	Warrant officer class 1	Warrant officer class 2	Staff sergeant	Sergeant	Corporal	Lance corporal	Private

Cadet NCOs wear the issued cadet rank slides. The titles of some ranks may vary as cadet detachments are affiliated to Army regiments and adopt their terminology. There is usually only one Cadet RSM per county. In many counties, there is the opportunity for appointment to Cadet Under Officer (CUO), an appointment allowing the holder to stay in the officers' mess.

Although promotion is based on merit rather than progression through the APC syllabus, the following criteria must be met before a cadet is eligible for promotion:

- Cadet Lance Corporal - Passed APC 1 Star
- Cadet Corporal - Passed APC 2 Star
- Cadet Sergeant - Passed APC 3 Star
- Cadet Staff/Colour Sergeant - Passed APC 4 Star
- Cadet Sergeant Major/Company Sergeant Major - Passed APC 4 Star
- Cadet Regimental Sergeant Major - Master Cadet
- Cadet Under Officer - Master Cadet - May be awarded to a cadet sergeant major who has shown officer potential and is in their last year as a cadet.

=== Officer ranks ===
The following are the insignia - emblems of authority - of the British Army. Badges for field officers were first introduced in 1810 and the insignia was moved to the shoulder boards in 1880 for all officers in full dress. Commissioned officers

Rank group	General / flag officers	Senior officers		Junior officers
Cayman Islands Cadet Corps
Cayman Islands Cadet Corps		Colonel	Lieutenant colonel	Major	Captain	Lieutenant	Second lieutenant	Officer cadet

== History ==
The Cayman Islands premier having stated the desire to raise a Cayman Islands Defence Force when it could be afforded, which would make the Cayman Islands the fifth British Overseas Territory to have a locally raised army unit, but it had only the Cayman Islands Cadet Corps until the creation of the Cayman Islands Regiment in 2020.

The CICC was established in 2001 and enacted by the Cayman Islands Cadet Corps Law of 2003. The First Commandant of the CICC, now retired, was Colonel Philip Hyre. In 2013, Lieutenant Colonel Bobeth O’Garro was confirmed as the Commandant for the CICC, thus becoming the first female Commandant to lead a Corps in the Caribbean region.

== Syllabus ==
The Organisation has been modeled on the UK Army Cadet Force organisation (ACF). The organisation aims to provide citizenship training via military-style activities, including instruction in military knowledge, drills, leadership, public speaking, field craft, land and sea navigation, signaling, physical fitness, first aid, arms skills, and music.

== Cayman Islands ==
The Cayman Islands is a British Overseas Territory and uses the same school curriculum as the UK. In September 2005 the CICC began working with the Cadet Vocational Qualification Organisation (CVQO) in the UK to add a vocational training element that has resulted in qualified cadets gaining the BTEC First Diploma in Public Services, which is equivalent to passes in four subjects at GCSE. The CICC became the first Cadet Corps in the Caribbean to offer such a diploma.

The CICC has an overseas exchange program with UK, Canada and other Caribbean Islands.
