= List of United Kingdom Services Cadet Forces by rank =

The following table displays the ranks of the Volunteer Police Cadets, St John Ambulance Cadets and Fire Cadets. This table is based on equivalent Rank Structures within the Cadet Forces as detailed in regulations of the SCC, RMC, and the Air Cadets.

== Cadet ranks ==
Cadets wear the issued cadet rank slides. The titles of most ranks in other Cadet Forces, such as the Army Cadet Force and the Sea Cadet Corps, usually follows equivalent ranks in the UK military. However due to the lack of ranks in the UK services the UK Cadet Services has created ranks and insignia.

Although promotion is based on merit rather than progression through the training syllabuses, certain criteria must be met before a cadet is eligible for promotion:

Cadet ranks and insignia
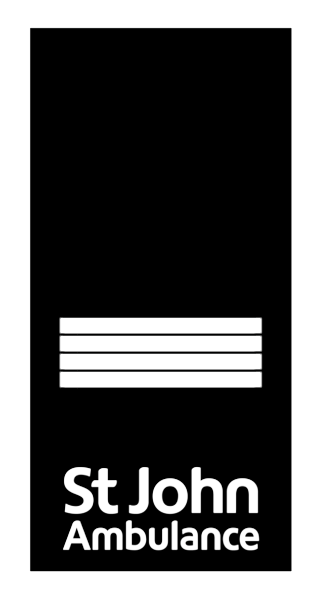
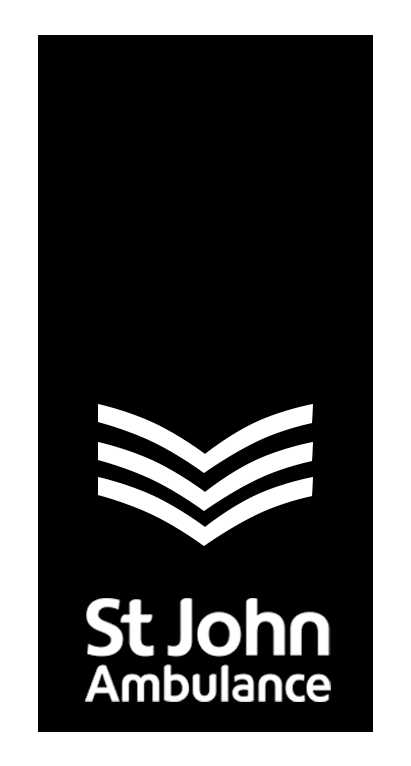
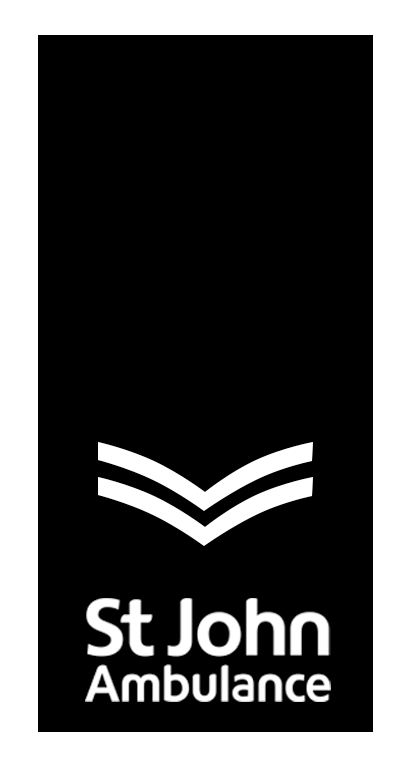
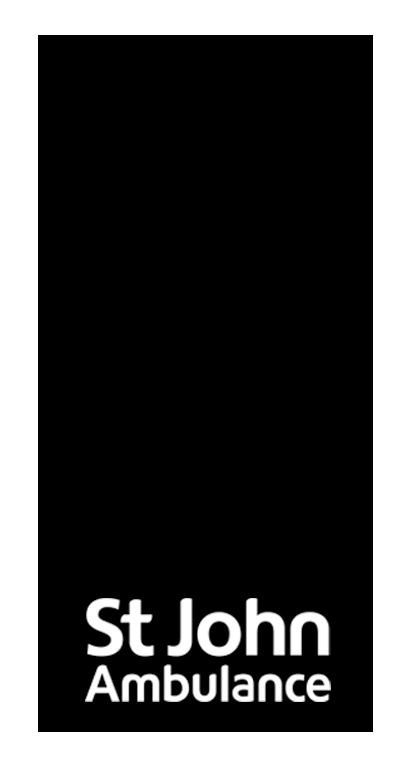
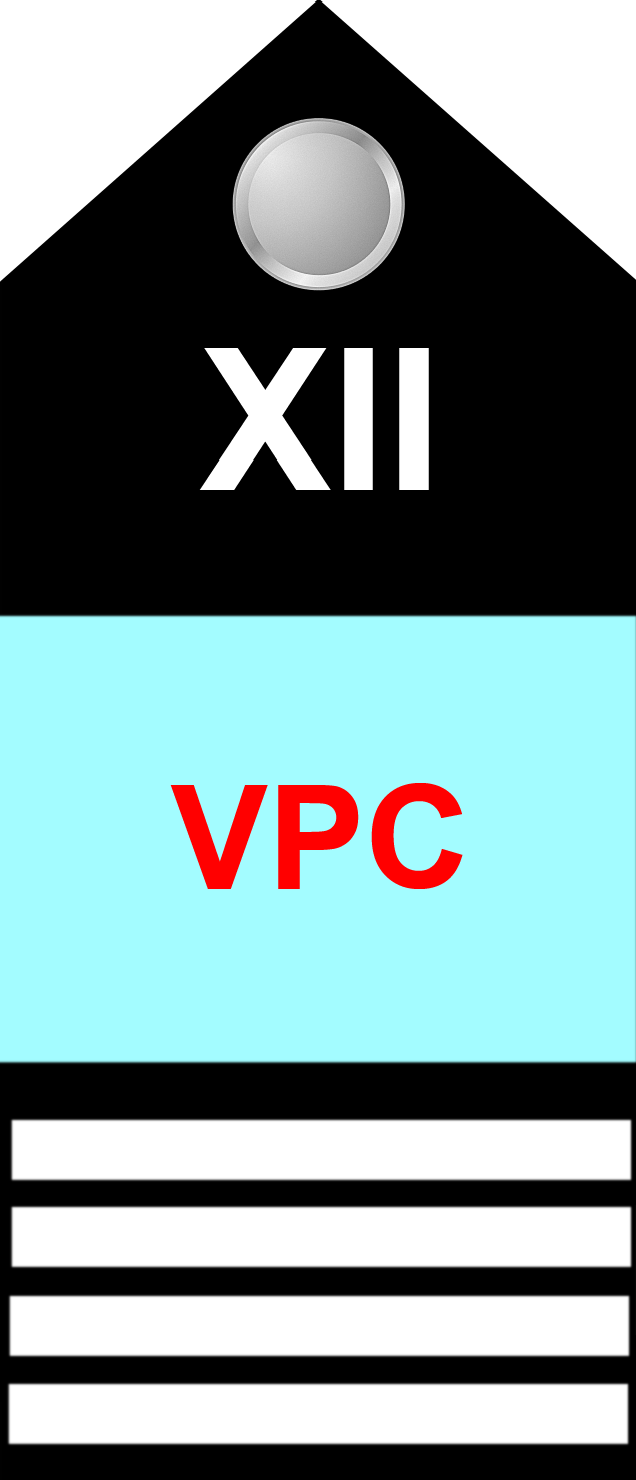
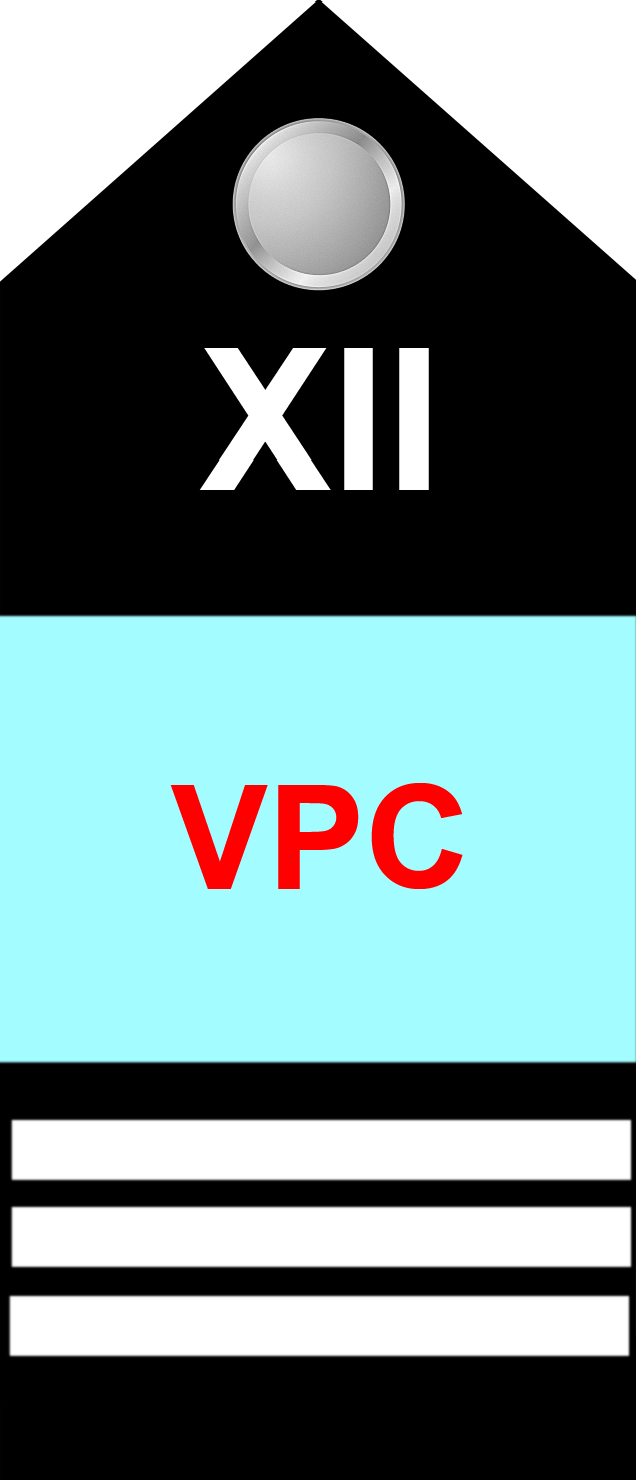
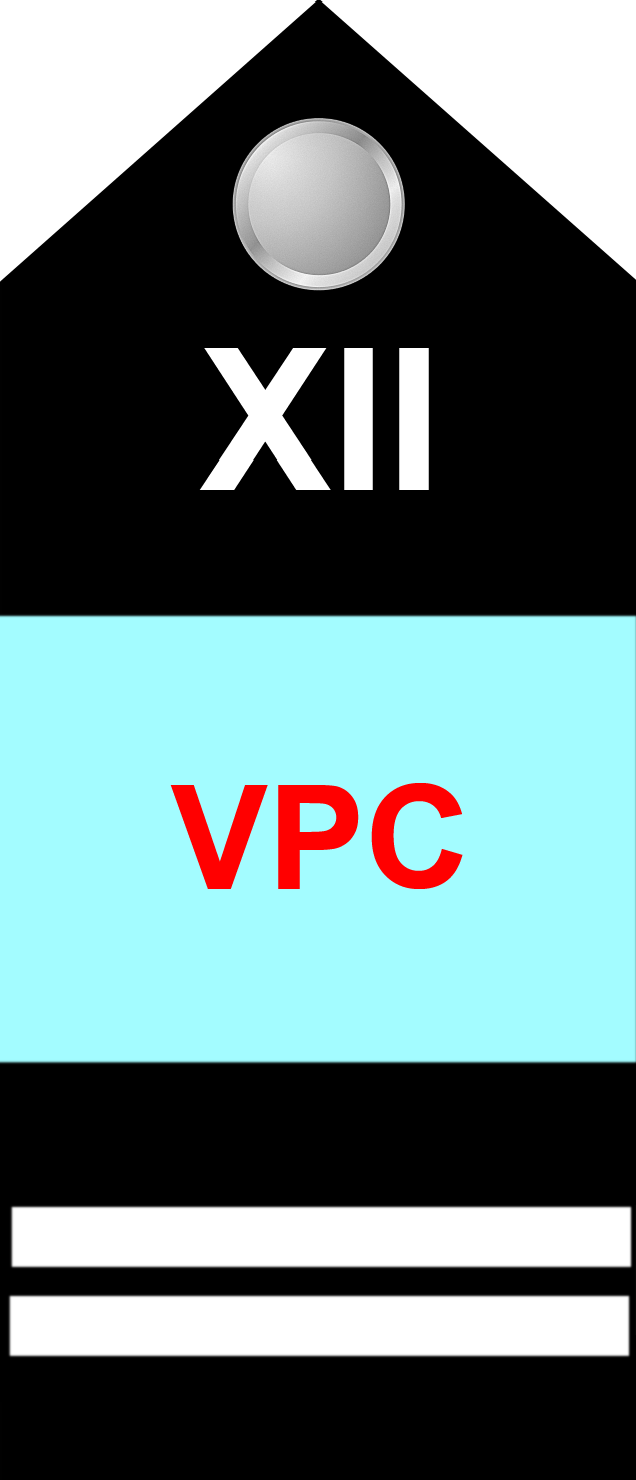
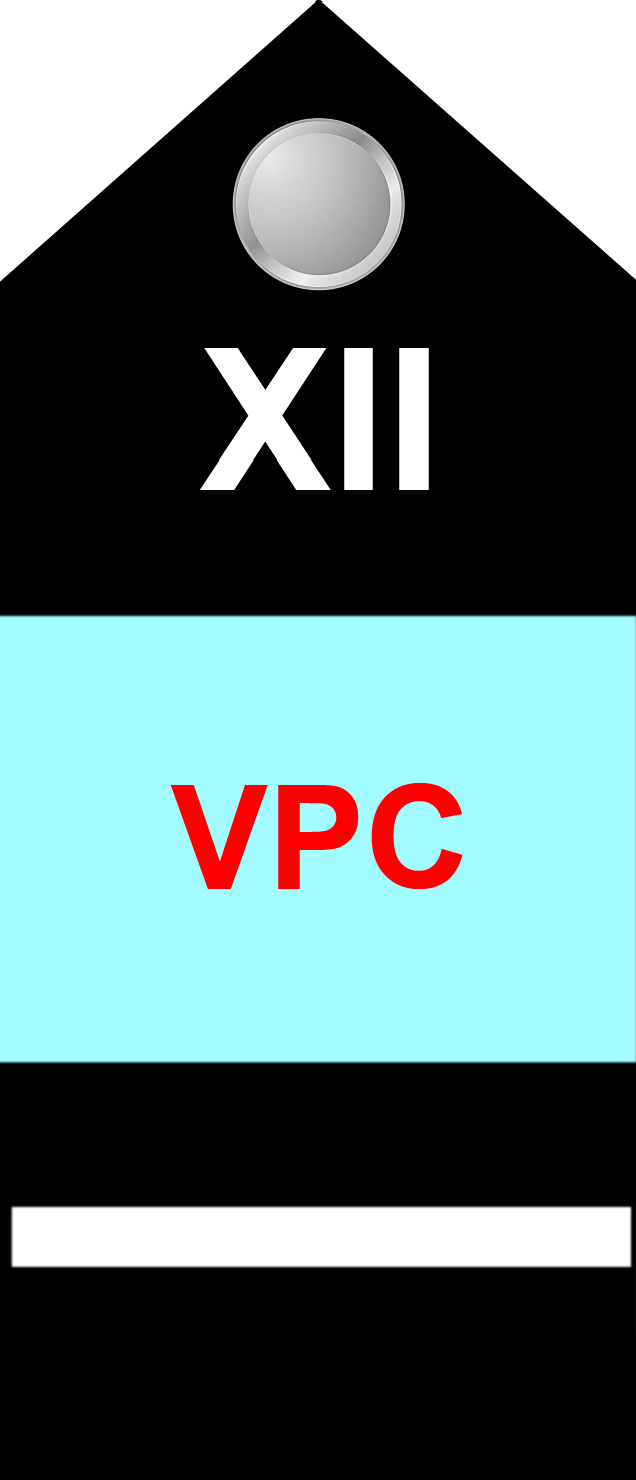
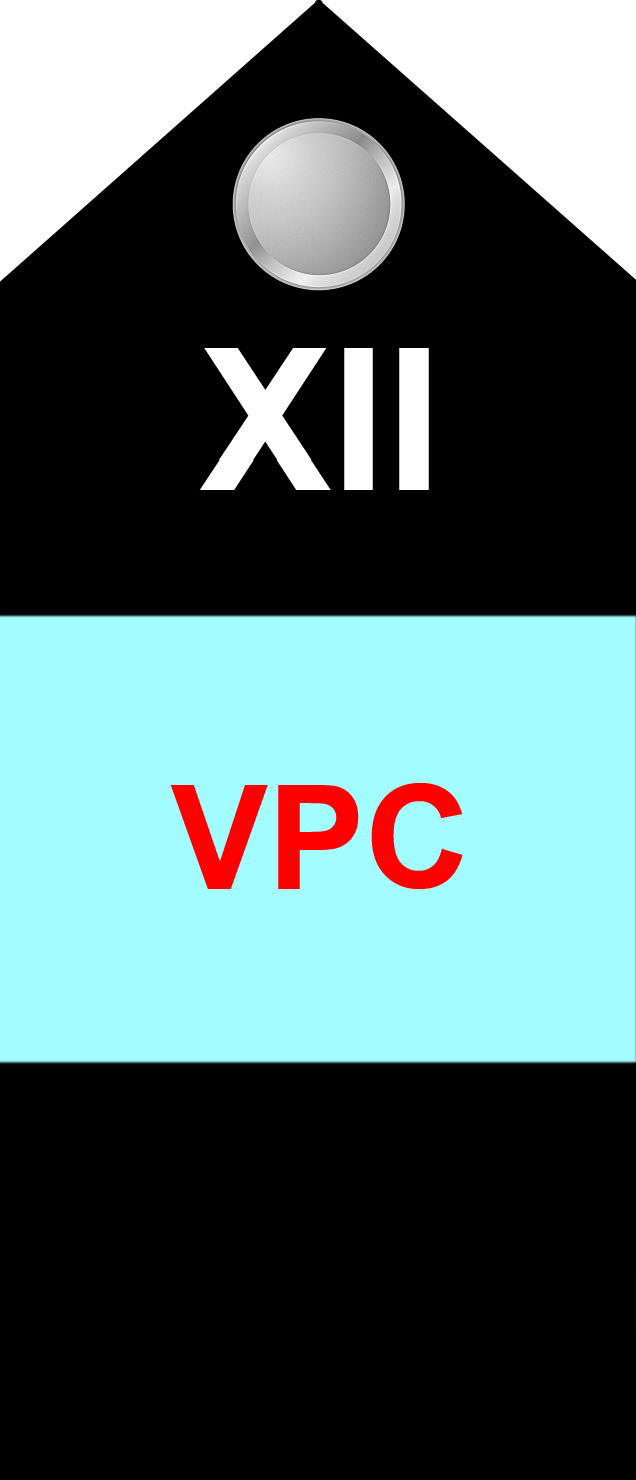
Cadet Service	Officers	Cadet Senior NCOs				Cadet Junior NCOs		Cadets	Recruits
St John's Ambulance Cadets									No insignia
St John's Ambulance Cadets	No equivalent	Leading Cadet	No equivalent	Cadet Sergeant	No equivalent	Cadet Corporal	No equivalent	Cadet	Recruit
St John's Ambulance Cadets		LCdt		CdtS		CdtC		Cdt	Rct
Cadet Service	Officers	Cadet Senior NCOs				Cadet Junior NCOs		Cadets	Recruits
Volunteer Police Cadets									No Insignia
Volunteer Police Cadets	No equivalent	Head Cadet	No equivalent	Deputy Head Cadet	No equivalent	Team Leader; Cadet	Deputy Team; Leader Cadet	Police Cadet	Recruit
Volunteer Police Cadets	No equivalent	HCdt	No equivalent	DHCdt	No equivalent	TLCdt	DTLCdt	Cdt	Rct

== See also ==
=== Cadet Forces ===
- Combined Cadet Force
- Community Cadet Forces
  - Air Training Corps
  - Army Cadet Force
  - Sea Cadet Corps
- Volunteer Cadet Corps
  - Royal Marines Volunteer Cadet Corps

=== Ranks of the British Services ===
- Police ranks of the United Kingdom
