= The Nautical Training Corps =

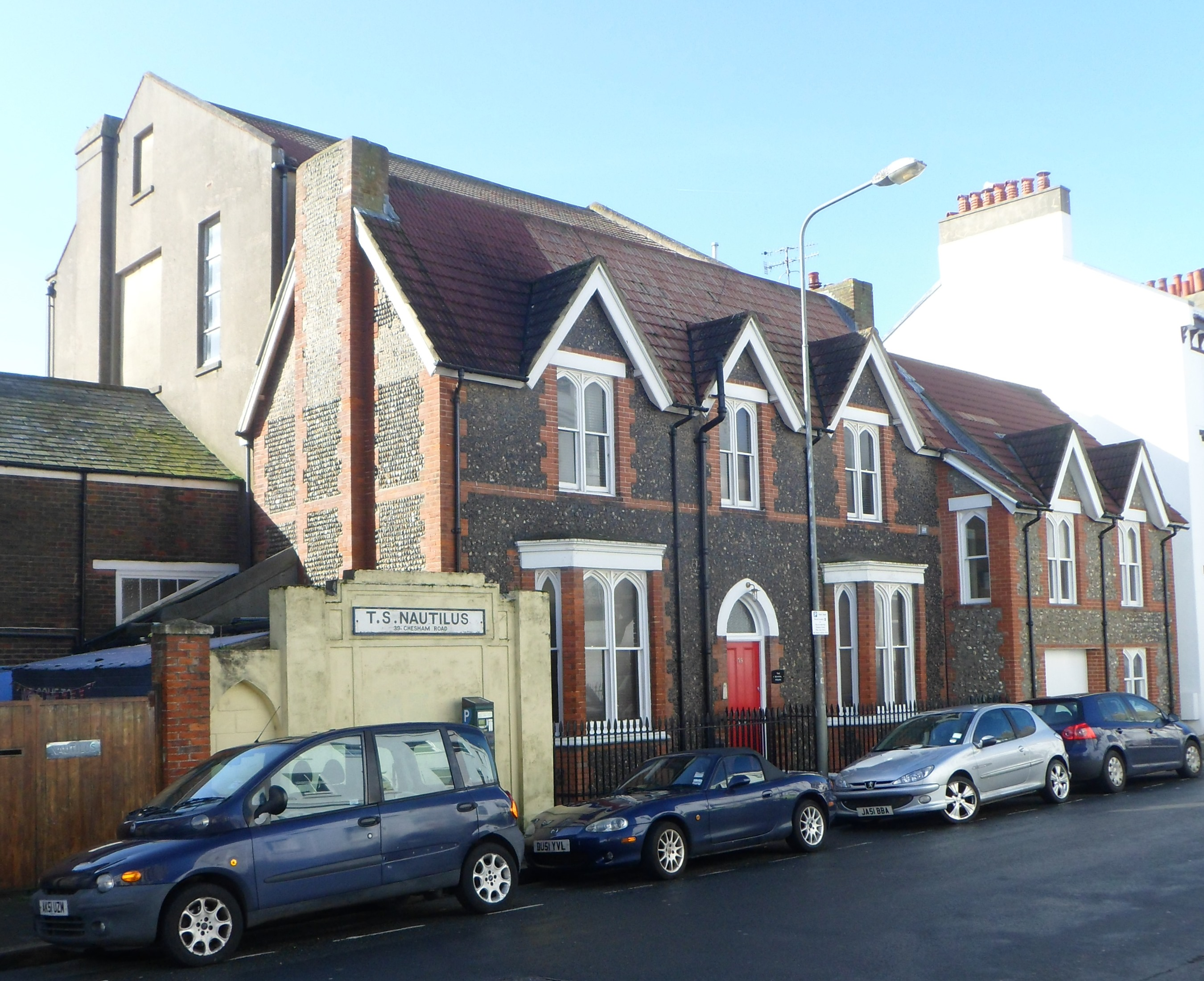
- T.S. Nautilus in Kemptown, Brighton, photographed in 2014
- Active: Founded 19 May 1944
- Country: United Kingdom
- Allegiance: Charles III
- Branch: Merchant Navy
- Type: Uniformed Youth Organisation
- Nickname: (NTC)
- Patron: Rear Admiral John Lippiett, CB, CBE, DL
- Decorations: Defaced Red Ensign (Ministry of Defence) 2014

Commanders
- Current commander: Commodore Brian Orchard NTC
- Founding Commodore: Cdre F P Froëst-Carr OBE NTC
- Vice Commodore: Administration and Compliance Branch: Vice Commodore Christine Harod NTC
- Vice Commodore: Operations Branch: Vice Commodore Christopher Clayton NTC
- Vice Commodore: Support and Resilience Branch: Vice Commodore Benjamin French FRSA NTC

The National Council
- Website: www.ntc.org.uk
- Chair: Ms Clayre Wilkins
- National Secretary: VCdre Christine Harod NTC (Interim)
- Treasurer: Vacant

The Nautical Training Corps (NTC) is a National Maritime Training and Uniformed Youth Organisation based in the south of England. Registered Charity Number: 306084, Cadets follow similar rates and ranks, traditions, values and ethos as the British Royal Fleet Auxiliary (RFA) and the Merchant Navy.

== The Founder ==
Frank Froëst-Carr, the son of a Scotland Yard police inspector, joined the Royal Navy as a 15-year-old boy entrant in the closing years of sail. He joined HMS Lion, at HMNB Devonport, a training ship for boy entrants. He completed his initial training in HMS Implacable, before joining HMS Nautilus for deep-sea training.

After leaving the service in 1926 he joined the Royal Naval Volunteer Reserve. He rose to Lieutenant Commander, later resigning his commission to start a new career in the Youth Service.

In 1973 the value of his service to youth was recognised by the award of an OBE. In 1975, he published "Spun Yarn & Bell Bottoms", a story of life on the lower deck in an old square-rigged training ship in the early years of the last century, and on a steam cruiser up to the end of World War I.

== History ==
The NTC’s first ‘unit’ was Training Ship Nautilus in Brighton, based at the old Richmond Road School. The unit took its name from HMS Nautilus, which had been Froëst-Carr's first seagoing ship in the Royal Navy. TS Nautilus is still open and serving local youth in Brighton.

This unit comprised 140 cadets and just 2 other officers. "First Brighton Division" was followed by "First London Division", TS Enterprise. The first National HQ was based at Pavilion Buildings, Brighton, underneath Brighton Chess Club and by the entrance to the Royal Pavilion. It later moved to the Old Shoreham Road and Shoreham Harbour.

On 20 January 1945 the first inspection of the Nautical Training Corps, occurred at TS Nautilus NTC on behalf of the Admiral Commanding Reserves, Royal Navy. Inspecting officer Commander W.L. Rosseter R.D. R.N.R congratulated the unit on their smartness in dress, general bearing, excellent discipline and progress.

Inspection on behalf of the Admiral Commanding Reserves, Royal Navy of TS Nautilus NTC.

The Corps spread throughout the south of England and beyond, particularly in Sussex, Hampshire and south London; there have also been units as far afield as Acton, Northampton, Milton Keynes and Derby. In all there have been over 64 units, or ‘Training Ships’, but the exact number is unknown as the records of some units have been lost over time. These have included an all-girl unit at TS Tudor Rose, and an all-boy unit, TS Collingwood, both at Langley Green in Crawley. All training ships have been named after serving or previous ships belonging to the Royal Navy.

== See also ==
- Girls' Nautical Training Corps
- Sea Cadet Corps (United Kingdom)
