= Navy League =

The Navy League refers to various organisations worldwide:

== The Leagues themselves ==
- Navy League of Great Britain, the organisation (now merged with The Marine Society) responsible for the Sea Cadet Corps and the Girls' Nautical Training Corps

Also:

- Navy League of Australia
- Navy League of Canada
- Navy League (Germany) in Imperial Germany
- Navy League of New Zealand
- Navy League of the United States

== Cadet organisations with Navy League roots ==
=== Boys ===
- Navy League Cadet Corps (USA), the younger version of the United States Naval Sea Cadet Corps
- Navy League Cadet Officers (Canada), volunteers that work for the Navy League Cadet Programme
- Navy League Cadet Programme (Canada), Cadet organisation
- Sea Cadet Corps (United Kingdom)

=== Girls ===
- Girls' Nautical Training Corps or GNTC
- Navy League Wrennette Corp, Canadian girls' Cadet organisation
