= Girls' Nautical Training Corps =

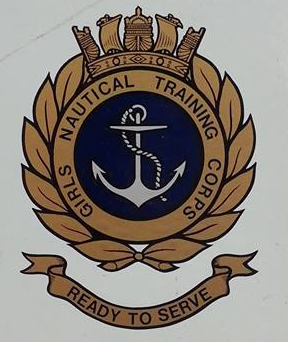
Badge of the Girls' Nautical Training Corps

The Girls' Nautical Training Corps was formed as part of the National Association of Training Corps for Girls in 1942, with units mainly in Southern England. Its objective was congruent with that of the Sea Cadet Corps, teaching girls aged 14 to 20 the same seamanship skills as the SCC taught the boys, in preparation for service with the Women's Royal Naval Service.

The Girls' Naval Training Corps numbered 50 Units in 1952, and in the late 1950s changed their name to the Girls' Nautical Training Corps. Lady Pamela Mountbatten was Corps Commandant of the GNTC from around 1952 to around 1959.

The GNTC became a colleague organisation with the Sea Cadet Corps in 1963, often sharing facilities such as Raven's Ait (then also known as TS Neptune). The GNTC became a full member of the Sea Cadet Organisation in March 1980, when the Ministry of Defence approved the admission of girls into the Sea Cadets, this led to a name change to Girls Nautical Training Contingent. This continued until 1992 when the organisation was absorbed, and all girls became members of the Sea Cadet Corps.

== Gallery ==
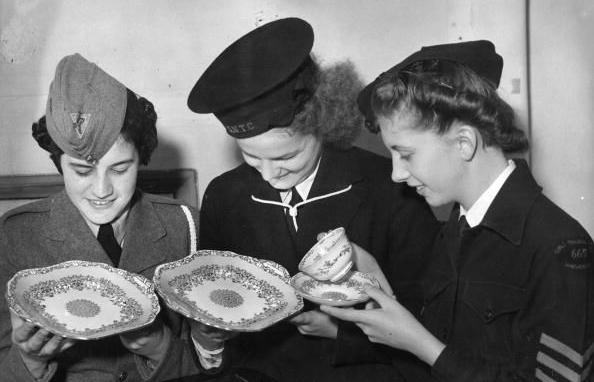
Members of the WJAC, GNTC and GTC during the 1940s

GNTC Officers Cap Badge

== See also ==
- The Marine Society & Sea Cadets
- Other Navy League organisations
- Sea Cadet Corps (United Kingdom)
- Bermuda Sea Cadet Corps
- Girls Venture Corps Air Cadets
- Navy League Wrennette Corps
- The Nautical Training Corps
