= Royal Marines Cadets =

Royal Marines Cadets (SCC)
- RMC (SCC)
- Royal Marines SCC
- Active: 1955–present
- Country: United Kingdom
- Type: Volunteer Youth Organisation sponsored by the Royal Marines
- Size: 3500 Cadets 1500 CFAVs, 152 Detachments
- Part of: Sea Cadet Corps
- Headquarters: London
- Patron: HRH Anne, Princess Royal
- March: "Dignus" ("Be Worthy")
- Website: https://www.sea-cadets.org/royal-marines-cadets

Commanders
- Admiral of the Sea Cadet Corps: Anne, Princess Royal
- Captain Sea Cadets: Captain Hannah MacKenzie RN
- Notable commanders: Colonel Paul Cautley OBE CMG RMR

Royal Marines Cadets (SCC) are part of the Sea Cadets, a United Kingdom uniformed youth organization was formed in 1955 by the then Commandant General Royal Marines – General Sir Campbell Hardy. The Royal Marines Cadets of the SCC specialise in activities such as orienteering, fieldcraft, and weapon handling.

There are also the smaller Combined Cadet Force (RM CCF) and Royal Marines Cadets of the Volunteer Cadet Corps (RM VCC) this article deals only with the Royal Marines Cadets of the Sea Cadet Corps (RM SCC).

== History ==
The Royal Marines Cadets were formed in 1955 as the Marine Cadet Section, after the then incoming Commandant General Royal Marines, General Sir Campbell Hardy, expressed a wish to form a Marine Cadet Section as part of the Sea Cadets.

The Marine Cadet Section was renamed Royal Marines Cadets, following an agreement the Admiralty Board to allow the use of "Royal" in their title. An official rebadging ceremony took place at the Commando Training Centre Royal Marines on 25 September 2011.

In 2014, the Royal Marines Cadets of the SCC, CCF and VCC were inspected by the Prince Philip, Duke of Edinburgh, in his capacity as Captain General Royal Marines, to mark the 350th anniversary of the Royal Marines.

In October 2019,a new corps march for the Royal Marines Cadets was performed for the first time at the National Trafalgar Day Parade. Composed by the Royal Marines Band Service, the piece is titled "Dignus" ("Be Worthy").

=== Investigation into sexual abuse ===
In 2012 payouts made to victims of sexual abuse across all Cadet Forces totaled £1,475,844. In 2013 payouts totaled £64,782, and in 2014 payouts totaled £544,213.

In 2017, a BBC Panorama episode entitled "Cadet Abuse Cover-Up" highlighted sexual abuse cases in the British Cadet Forces. In a 1979 case of sexual abuse of a 14 year old cadet in Hertfordshire, the boy's parents were dissuaded from reporting the offender to police by Sea Cadet officers in full uniform, who had visited their home. The offender was neither dismissed or suspended but instead promoted to oversee 10 cadet units in London. In the years 2012 to 2017 there were 28 allegations of sexual abuse made against SCC volunteers, including historical allegations. All 28 offenders were dismissed and referred to police.

== Organisation ==
Royal Marines Cadets (SCC) are a sub-branch of the Sea Cadet Corps which created in 1955 on command of the Captain General Royal Marines and the Commandant General Royal Marines to be a Detachment of the Sea Cadet Corps, similar to the structure of the Royal Marines as part of the Royal Navy. The exception is Chatham Royal Marines Cadet Unit (formally RM VCC) which was established in 1903. The first Marine Cadet Detachment was opened in Bristol Adventure Unit. Marine Cadets was formed for "...sturdy, adventurous boys..." Sea Cadet Units may open a Royal Marines Cadets Detachment, who will use the same facilities, parade alongside Sea Cadets and fall under the command of the unit CO. Royal Marines Cadet Detachments wear the uniform of the Royal Marines with the exception of Commando qualification badges, and wear cadet specific insignia.

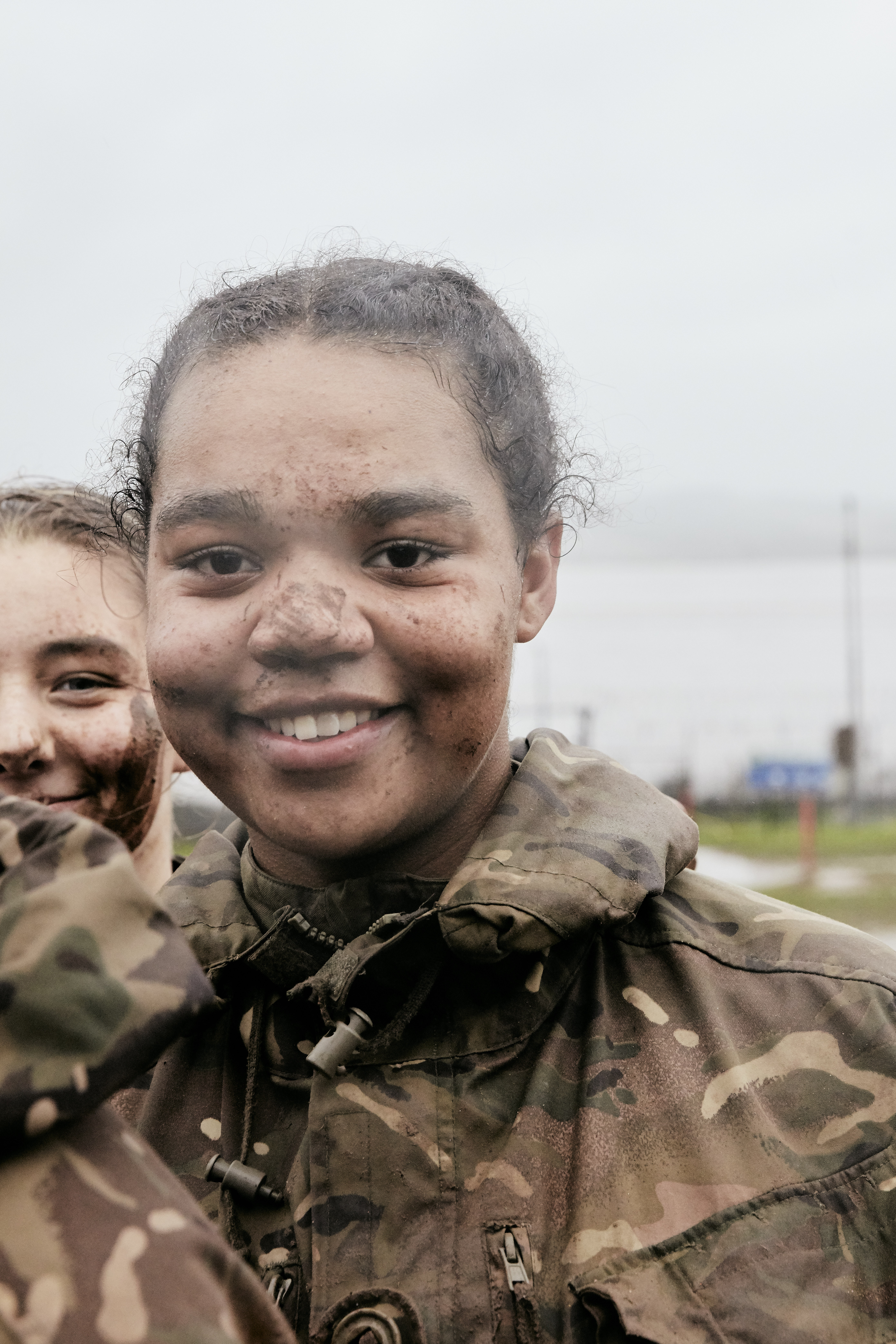
Royal Marines Cadet at Gibraltar Cup, 2019

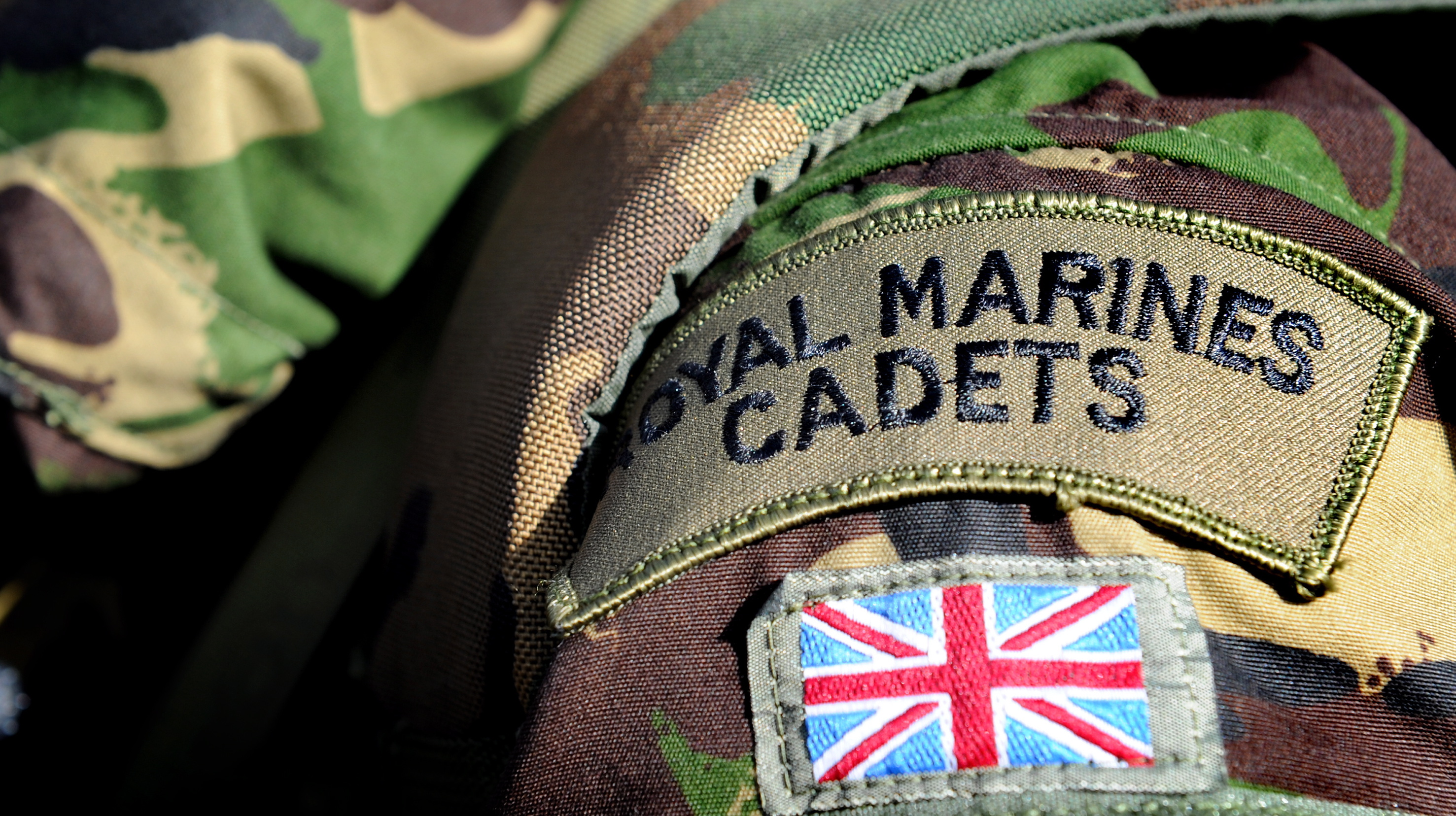
The Royal Marines Cadets of the SCC were formed in 1955 at the request of the Commandant General Royal Marines. Although it is an integral part of the Sea Cadet Corps, it looks to the Corps of Royal Marines for its styles and standards of dress, drill and training.

=== Company/Area Level ===
Companies cover the same area as the Sea Cadet "Area", and each is identified by a phonetic letter.

- ALPHA Company – South West Area
- BRAVO Company – North West Area
- LIMA Company – London Area
- XRAY Company – Eastern Area
- YANKEE Company – Northern Area
- ZULU Company – Southern Area
- Support Company – National

Each company has a Company Commander (usually a Major (SCC) RMR and forms a Company HQ.

- Company Second in Command (2IC) – an organisation of the coy and officer development
- Company Sergeant Major (CSM)
- Troop Commanders
- Company Training Officer
- Company Drill Leader
- Company Medic
- Company Quartermaster – Organises Company Stores
- Company Quartermaster Sergeant (CQMS) – Assists the Quartermaster

== Gibraltar Cup Competition ==
The Gibraltar Cup was presented by then Commandant General Royal Marines General Sir Campbell Richard Hardy and named from the Battle Honour of that Corps. It is awarded annually to the Royal Marines Cadet Detachment (RMCD) of the SCC which is considered to have attained the highest standard of all-round merit in the previous year. Jersey Detachment (ZULU Company, Southern Area) received the award in 2024.

== Ranks ==
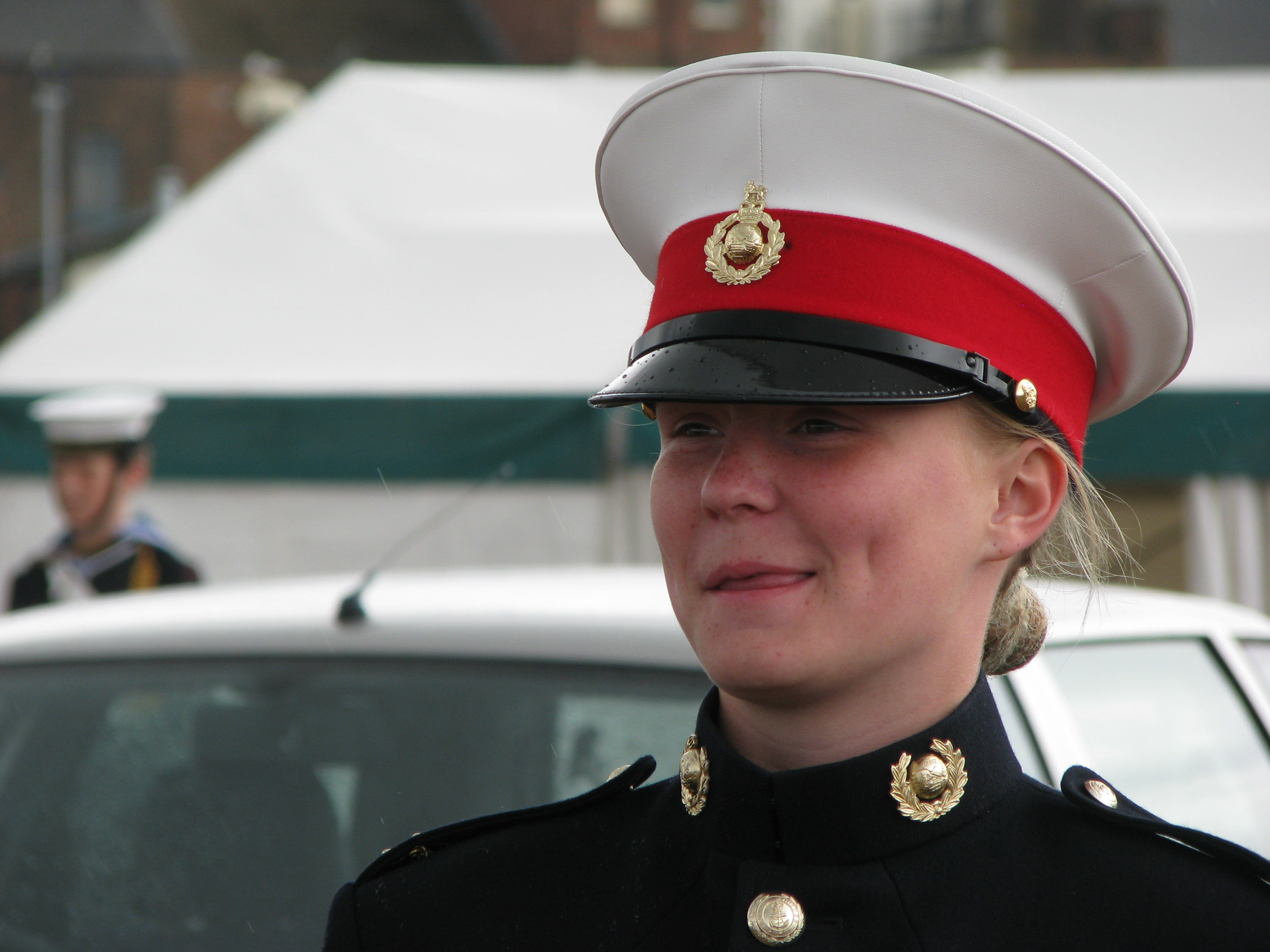
Female Royal Marine Cadet, 2008

=== Cadets ===
Royal Marines Cadets of the SCC are primarily trained in their Detachment formations. Whilst working through the syllabus, Royal Marines Cadets have many opportunities to participate in training with their Sea Cadet counterparts, as well as courses at Troop, Company and National level. Royal Marines Cadet to Cadet Lance Corporal Promotion Boards are convened at company level, as are Cadet Lance Corporal to Cadet Corporal boards are at company level, and Cadet Corporal to Cadet Sergeant Promotion Boards are convened at a National level by Support Company.

Royal Marines Cadets (Part of the SCC)				No insignia	No insignia
Royal Marines Cadets (Part of the SCC)	Cadet sergeant	Cadet corporal	Cadet lance corporal	Marine cadet	Marine cadet recruit
Royal Marines Cadets (Part of the SCC)	CDT SGT	CDT CPL	CDT LCPL	MC	MCR

=== CFAV Senior NCOs and Warrant Officers ===
Warrant Officer 1st Class	Warrant Officer 2nd Class	Colour Sergeant	Sergeant	Probationary Sergeant

=== CFAV Officers ===
Lieutenant Colonel (SCC) RMR (Note: introduced August 2009)	Major (SCC) RMR	Captain (SCC) RMR	Lieutenant (SCC) RMR	Second Lieutenant (SCC) RMR

== See also ==
=== Other Royal Marine Cadets ===
- Royal Marines Volunteer Cadet Corps
- Royal Marines Section Combined Cadet Force

=== Other elements of the Community Cadet Forces ===
- Army Cadet Force
- Air Training Corps
- Sea Cadets

=== Other MoD Sponsored Cadet Forces ===
- Combined Cadet Force
- Volunteer Cadet Corps

=== Related articles ===
- Reserve Forces and Cadets Association
- Marine Society and Sea Cadets
- National Association of Training Corps for Girls
- Young Marines – American equivalent
