= TS Jack Petchey =

British-flagged training ship

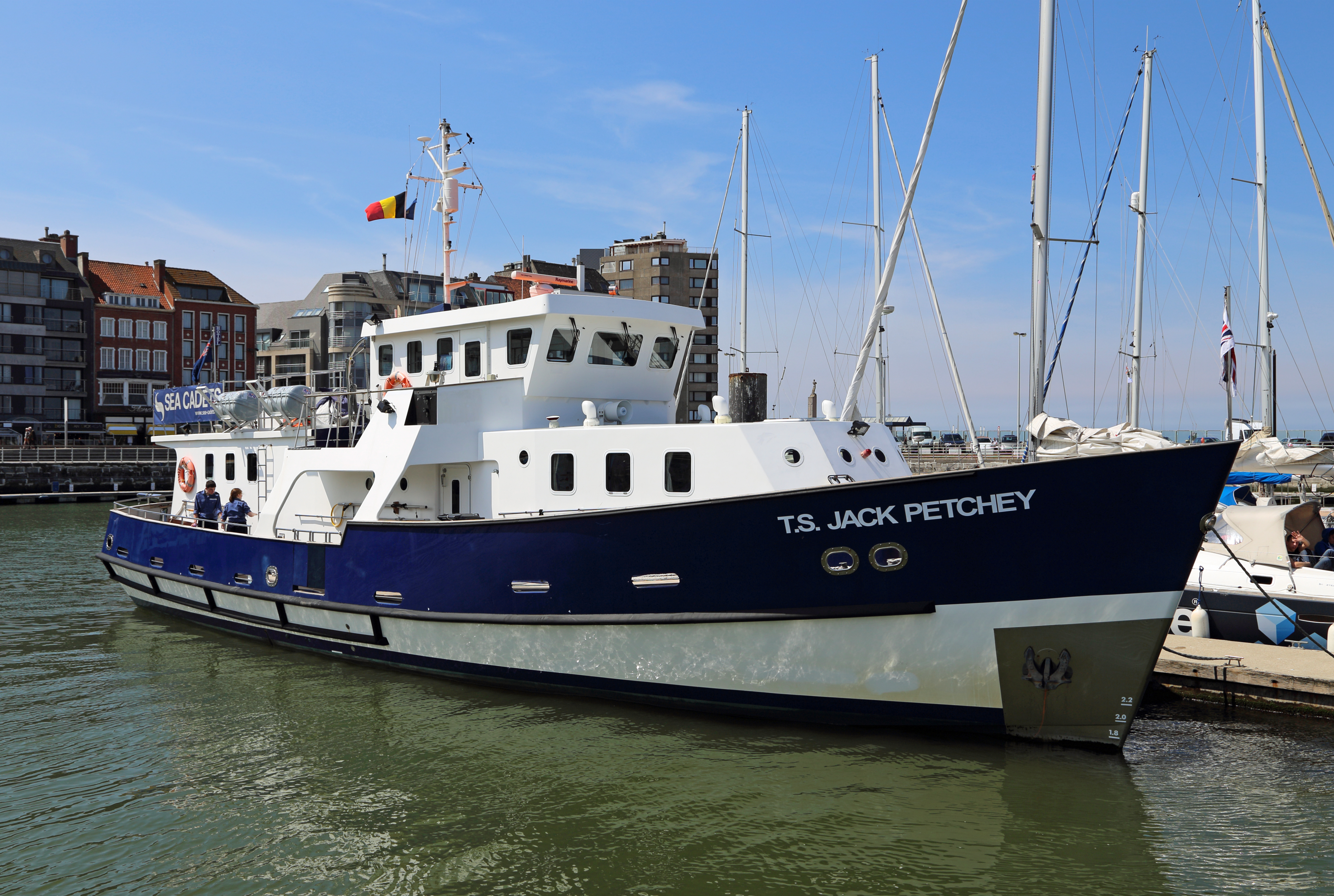
TS Jack Petchey in Ostend, Belgium

The TS Jack Petchey, is a British-flagged training ship, named after Jack Petchey OBE. The Jack Petchey is part of the Offshore Fleet of the Sea Cadet Corps, and is used to take 12 Sea Cadets to sea, although she comes alongside most nights she does have the capability to carry out extended passages. Whilst at sea the Sea Cadets aboard the Jack Petchey are able to put into practical use their seamanship and navigational training, as well as earning RYA (Royal Yachting Association) qualifications up to Watch leader. The Jack Petchey visits a number of ports across Britain and the Continent throughout the year.

== Ships history ==
TS Jack Petchey was built in 2010, by the Bridgend Boat Company in Plymouth, and cost £2.6 million. It measures 24 metres (79 ft) in length and is powered by a motor. It was initially built to join its sister ship TS John Jerwood, which has been running since 2003.

== Upkeep ==
The five ships in the Sea Cadet fleet are as follows: TS Royalist (2014), TS City Of London (2017), TS Sir Stelios (2018), TS Jack Petchey (2010), and TS John Jerwood (2003). Whilst on all of these ships the upkeep is the same, since TS Jack Petchey and TS John Jerwood resemble each other, the voyage upkeep, and payment is similar. The TS Royalist is a sailing vessel and the activities on board include more manual work, for example, setting the sails.
