= Community Cadet Forces =

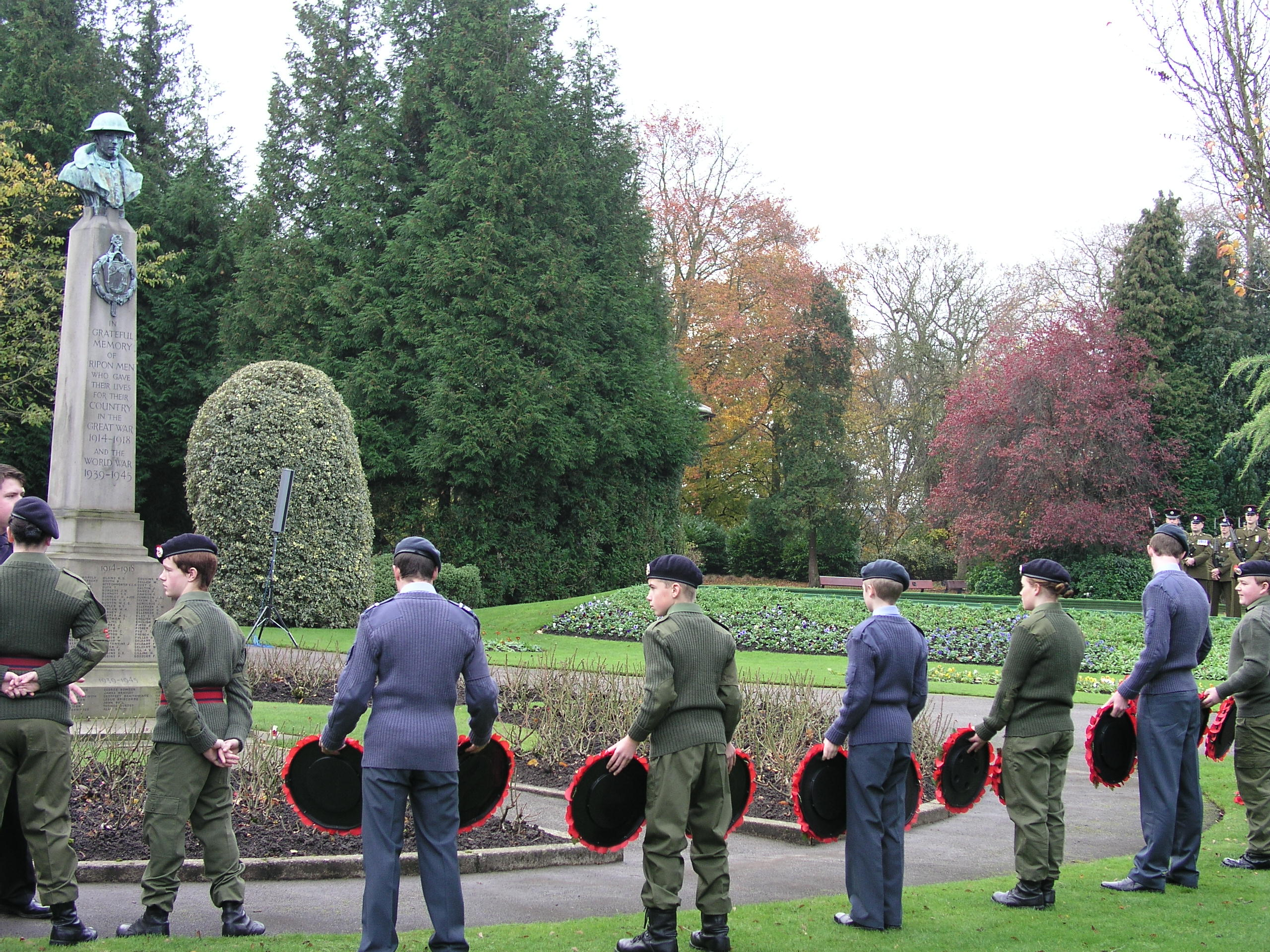
Cadets from the Air Training Corps and Army Cadet Force during Remembrance Sunday, Ripon 2006

The Community Cadet Forces is a term used by the United Kingdom Ministry of Defence (MOD) to group together the Sea Cadet Corps, Army Cadet Force, Air Training Corps, and Volunteer Cadet Corps. Together with the Combined Cadet Force (CCF) they constitute the UK's MOD-sponsored cadet forces. The Volunteer Cadet Corps, which in 2017 became the fifth MOD sponsored cadet force, enjoy close ties with the Royal Marines elements of the Sea Cadet Corps and the Combined Cadet Force forming a tri-partite family of 'Royal Marines Cadets'.

While these cadet forces are sponsored by the MOD and maintain strong ties, traditions and customs with the British Armed Forces, they are Volunteer Youth Organisations and have no liability for military service. The MOD describe the Cadet Forces as offering "challenging and enjoyable activities for young people, and prepare them to play an active part in the community while developing valuable life skills."

As of 1 April 2019, there were 110,620 Cadets and Cadet Force Adult Volunteers in the Community Cadet Forces.

== Cadet Ranks ==
Army cadets ranks share associated regiments' equivalent rank title.

Cadet Ranks are not equivalent to their real word NATO counterparts, and as such Cadet rank equivalency will not mirror that of the NATO table.

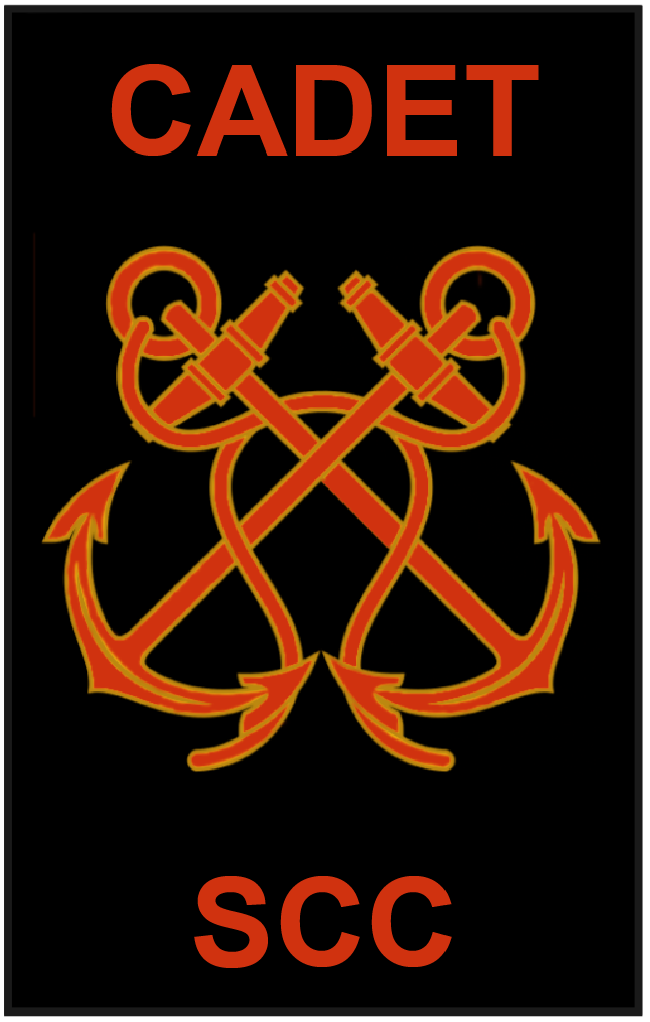
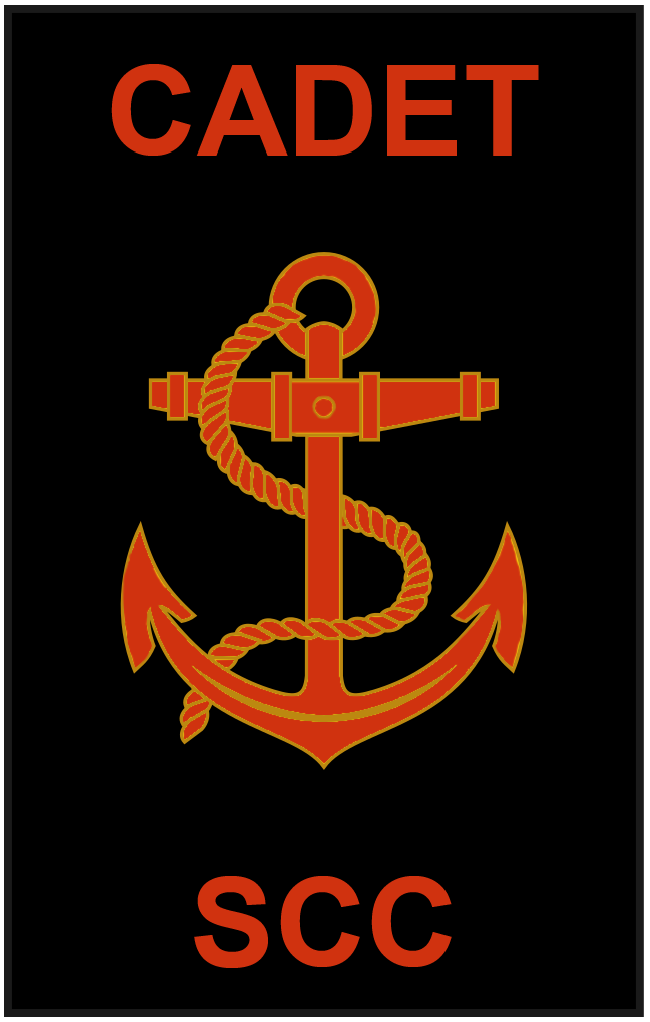
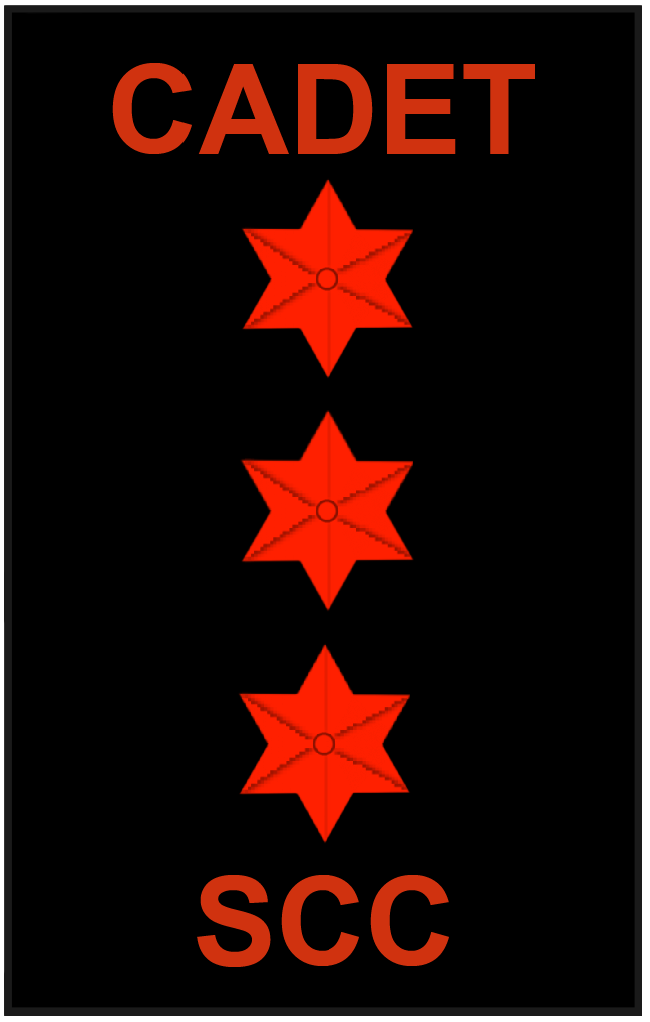
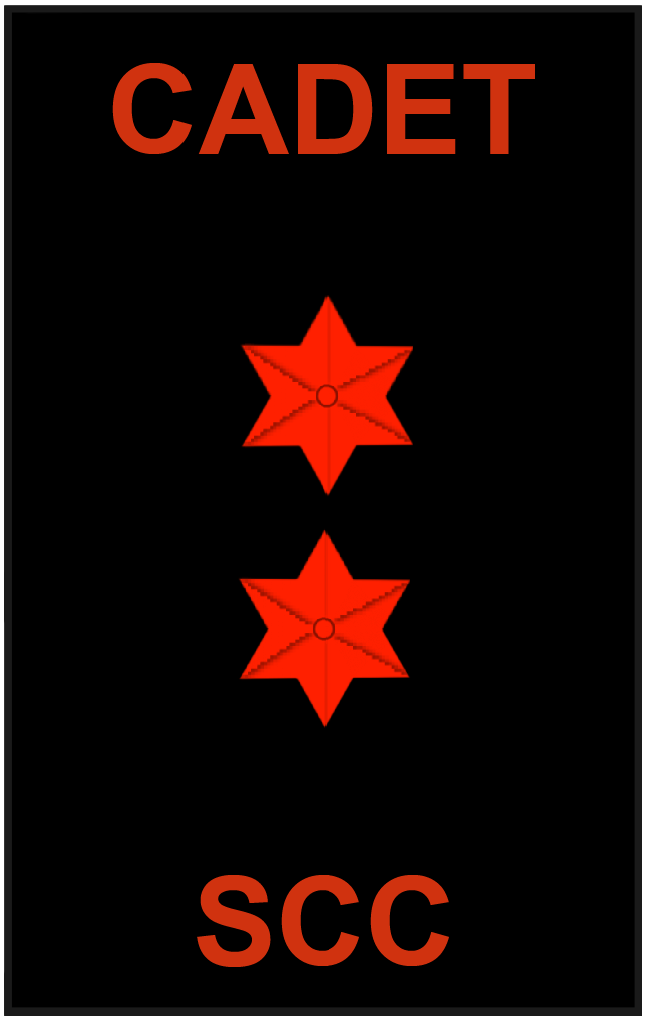
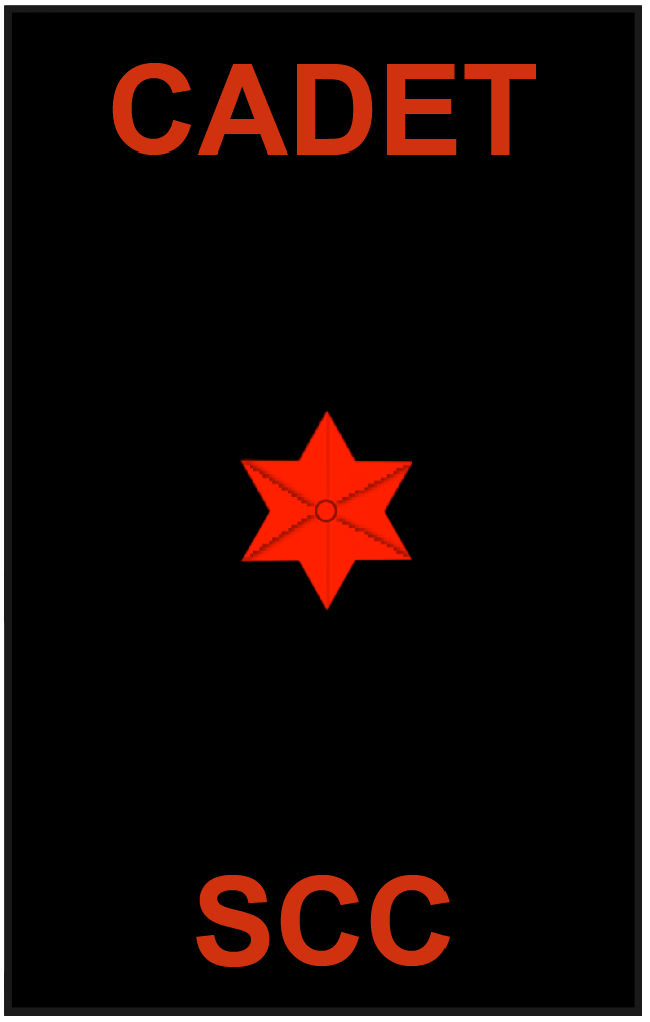
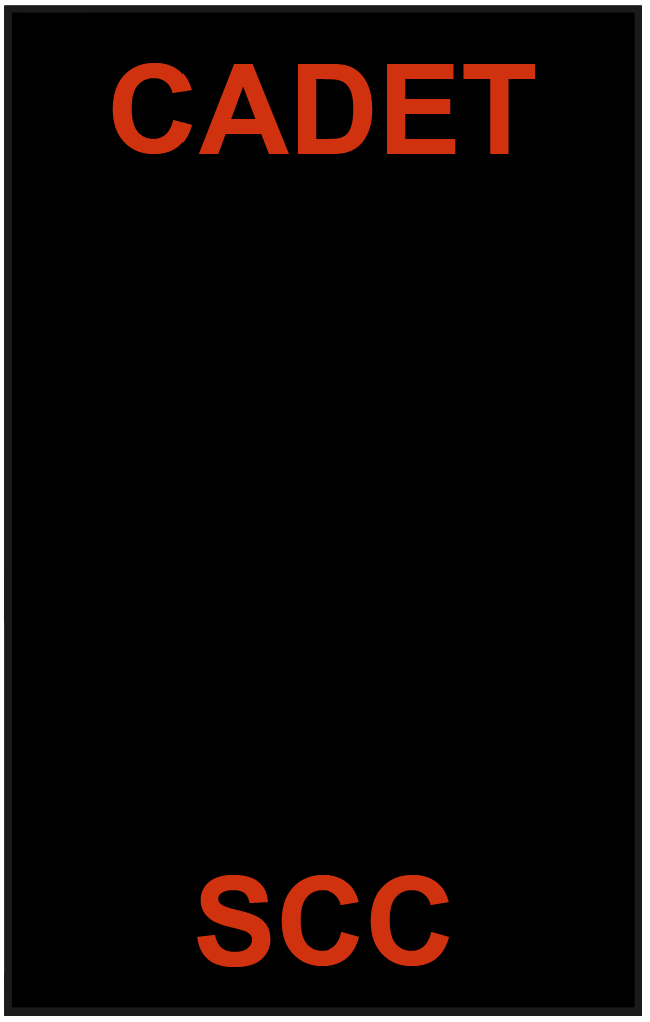
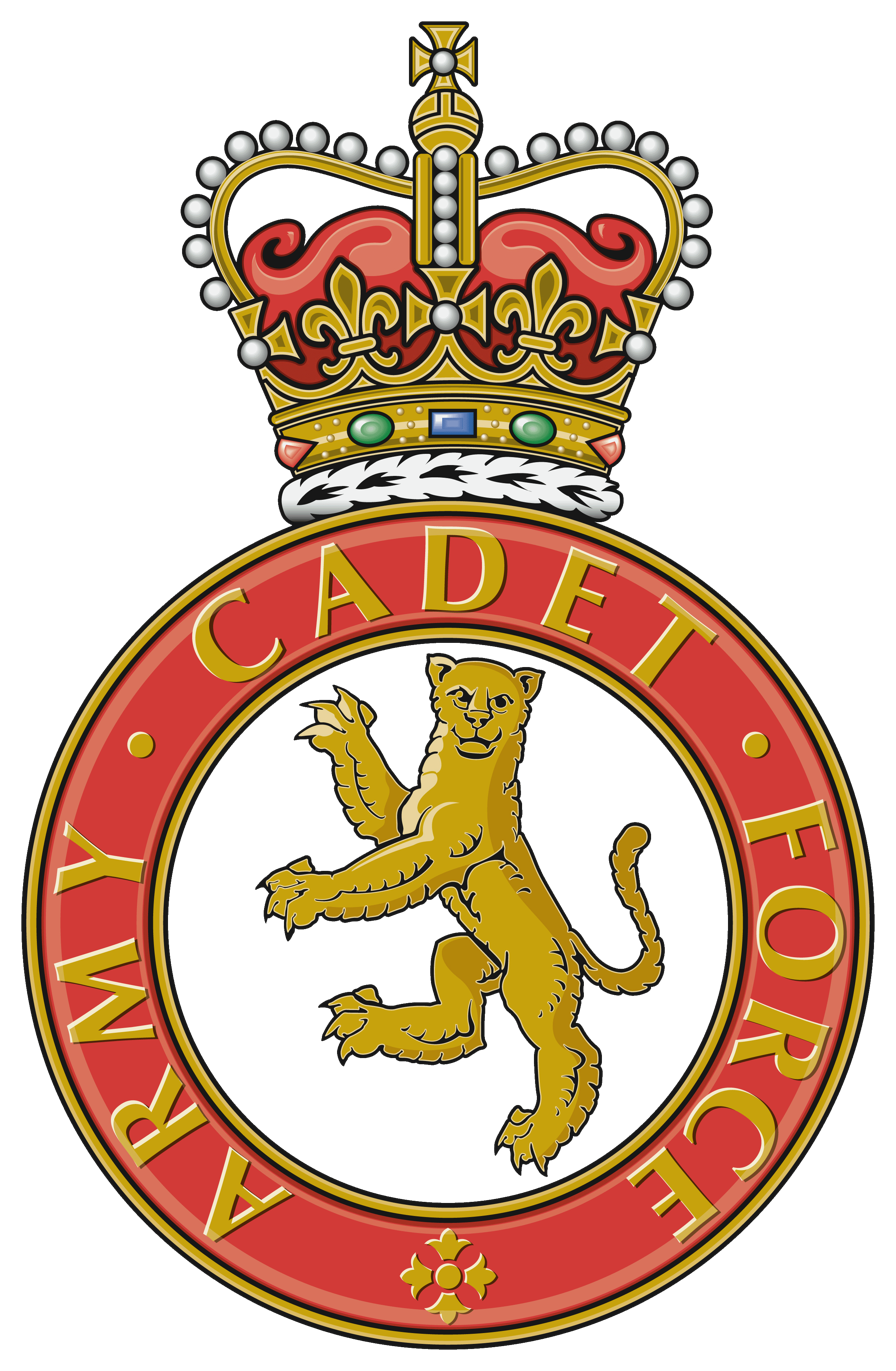
Sea Cadets Corps	No insignia
Petty officer cadet	Leading cadet	Able cadet	Ordinary cadet	Cadet 1st class	Cadet	New entry
POC	LC	AC	OC	CFC	CDT	NE
Royal Marines Cadets (Part of the SCC)	No insignia	No insignia
Cadet sergeant	Cadet corporal	Cadet lance corporal	Marine cadet	Marine cadet recruit
CDT SGT	CDT CPL	CDT LCPL	MC	MCR
Army Cadet Force
Cadet under officer	Cadet regimental sergeant major	Cadet company sergeant major	Cadet staff sergeant	Cadet sergeant	Cadet corporal	Cadet lance corporal	Cadet	Recruit
Cdt UO	Cdt RSM	Cdt CSM	Cdt SSgt	Cdt Sgt	Cdt Cpl	Cdt LCpl	Cdt	Rct
Air Training Corps	No insignia
Cadet warrant officer	Cadet flight sergeant	Cadet sergeant	Cadet corporal	Cadet
CWO	Cdt FS	Cdt Sgt	Cdt Cpl	Cdt

== See also ==
- Cadets (youth program)
- Reserve Forces and Cadets Association

== Sources ==
- Army Cadet Force Regulations (PDF). November 2022. Archived from the original (PDF) on 18 July 2024.
