= Marine Society & Sea Cadets =

UK seafarers' organisation

- Type: Charitable organisation
- Registration no.: England and Wales: 313013 Scotland: SC037808
- Purpose: Education/training
- Location: 200b Lambeth Road, London SE1 7JY
- Region served: United Kingdom
- Key people: Guy Holloway (CEO), Captain Neil Downing RN (Captain Sea Cadets)
- Revenue: £19.8 million (2019)
- Employees: 186 (2019)
- Volunteers: 9500 (2019)
- Website: www.ms-sc.org

The Marine Society & Sea Cadets is a seafarers' charity in the United Kingdom and the national organisation for sea cadets. It was formed in 2004 when the Sea Cadets and The Marine Society merged. It is a registered charity in England, Wales and Scotland.

== Activities ==
The MSSC oversees the Sea Cadet Corps, a British voluntary uniformed youth cadet organisation. It consists of about 400 units and 15,000 young people learning nautical and life skills. The first Sea Cadet Unit was established in Whitstable in 1856.

Its headquarters is in Lambeth, in London, in the former Archbishop Temple Boys School. (grid reference TQ308790 approx)

== See also ==
- The Marine Society College of the Sea
- Sea Scouts
- Volunteer Cadet Corps
