= Sea Cadets (United Kingdom) =

National youth charity

Sea Cadet Corps
- Founded: 1856
- Country: United Kingdom
- Type: National youth charity sponsored by the Royal Navy
- Size: 14,030 Cadets (as of 1 April 2025); 6,200 Adult Volunteers; 6 regional watersports centres 5 offshore vessels 4 national training centres
- Headquarters: London
- Motto: Ready Aye Ready
- Website: Sea Cadets

Commanders
- Admiral of the Sea Cadet Corps: The Princess Royal
- Captain Sea Cadets: Capt Hannah MacKenzie RN

Insignia
- Ensign

- Badge

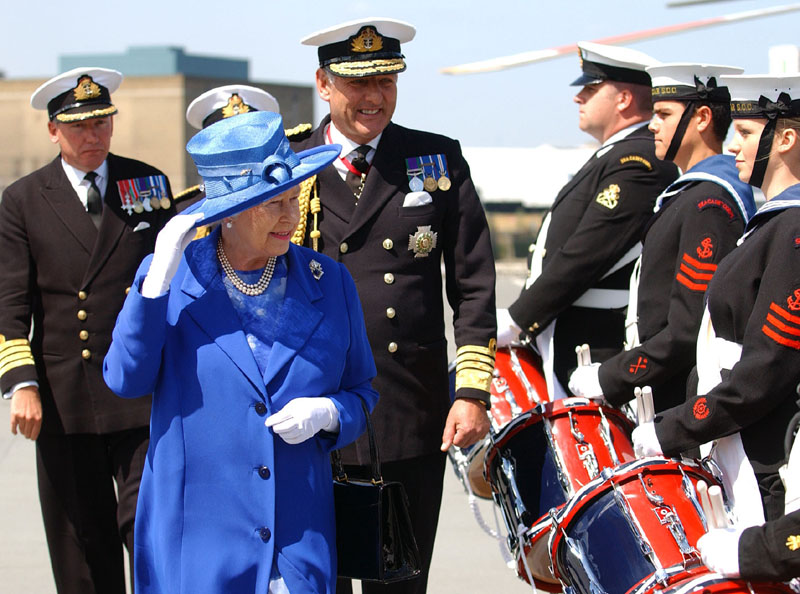
Queen Elizabeth II and Admiral Sir Jonathon Band in 2006 to celebrate the 250th Anniversary of the Marine Society and Sea Cadets

The Sea Cadet Corps (SCC), commonly known as Sea Cadets, is a United Kingdom–based national youth charity offering personal development opportunities for young people through nautical adventure and training. Cadets take part in activities including sailing, watersports, engineering and leadership training, developing skills such as teamwork, confidence and resilience. The organisation operates across England, Scotland, Wales and Northern Ireland, as well as affiliated units overseas.

== History ==
In 1854, a vicar in Whitstable, Kent, returned from the Crimean War and founded an orphanage where sailors taught nautical skills to prepare orphans for future careers. Multiple similar orphanages were founded across the country, and the organisation became known as the Naval Lads' Brigade. In 1899 Queen Victoria presented £10 (equivalent to £1,670 in 2026) to the Windsor Unit to purchase uniforms.

In 1910, the Navy League sponsored a small number of units as the Navy League Boys' Naval Brigade, and in 1919 the organisation adopted the name Navy League Sea Cadet Corps. In 1937, Lord Nuffield donated £50,000 (equivalent to £4.42 million in 2026) to fund an expansion of the Corps.

King George VI became the Admiral of the Corps in 1942 and the name was changed to the Sea Cadet Corps. The Sea Cadets had approximately 400 units and 50,000 Cadets. The Girls Naval Training Corps was also formed (later renamed Girls Nautical Training Corps in 1950). Queen Elizabeth II became the Patron of the Sea Cadets in 1952. In 1955 the Sea Cadet Council agreed to the formation of the Marine Cadet Section. The Girls Nautical Training Corps became affiliated with the Sea Cadet Corps in 1963. The Royal Naval Association began planning the first British colonial unit in Bermuda in 1964, with TS Bermuda formed on 12 January 1966. Located at Admiralty House, Bermuda, it was followed by two further units (TS Venture at the former Roman Catholic chapel of the Royal Naval Dockyard, Bermuda and TS Admiral Somers at Convict Bay, St. George's, another former Admiralty property).

On 31 March 1980 the Ministry of Defence approved the admission of girls into the Sea Cadet Corps. The successful integration of girls into the Sea Cadet Corps led to the dissolution of the Girls Nautical Training Corps in 1992.

== Ethos ==
The Sea Cadets' ethos is made up of three parts: its values, its mindset, and the customs and traditions of the Royal Navy. The promise made by every cadet who joins the Sea Cadet Corps is as follows:

The Sea Cadet Promise: I promise to serve my God, my King, my country, and, the Sea Cadet Corps and to obey the orders of my superior officers. I will be proud of my uniform and be smart and seamanlike in wearing it, and, always do my duty. (Note: My God refers to an individual’s own faith and is intended to apply equally to those from all faiths or none. (Sea Cadets' Ethos, 2019, p4))

The ethos is underpinned by Sea Cadet values including courage, commitment, respect, loyalty, honesty and integrity. These are taught by staff throughout the time cadets are with a unit; chaplains will also take a lead in such delivery.

== Cadets ==
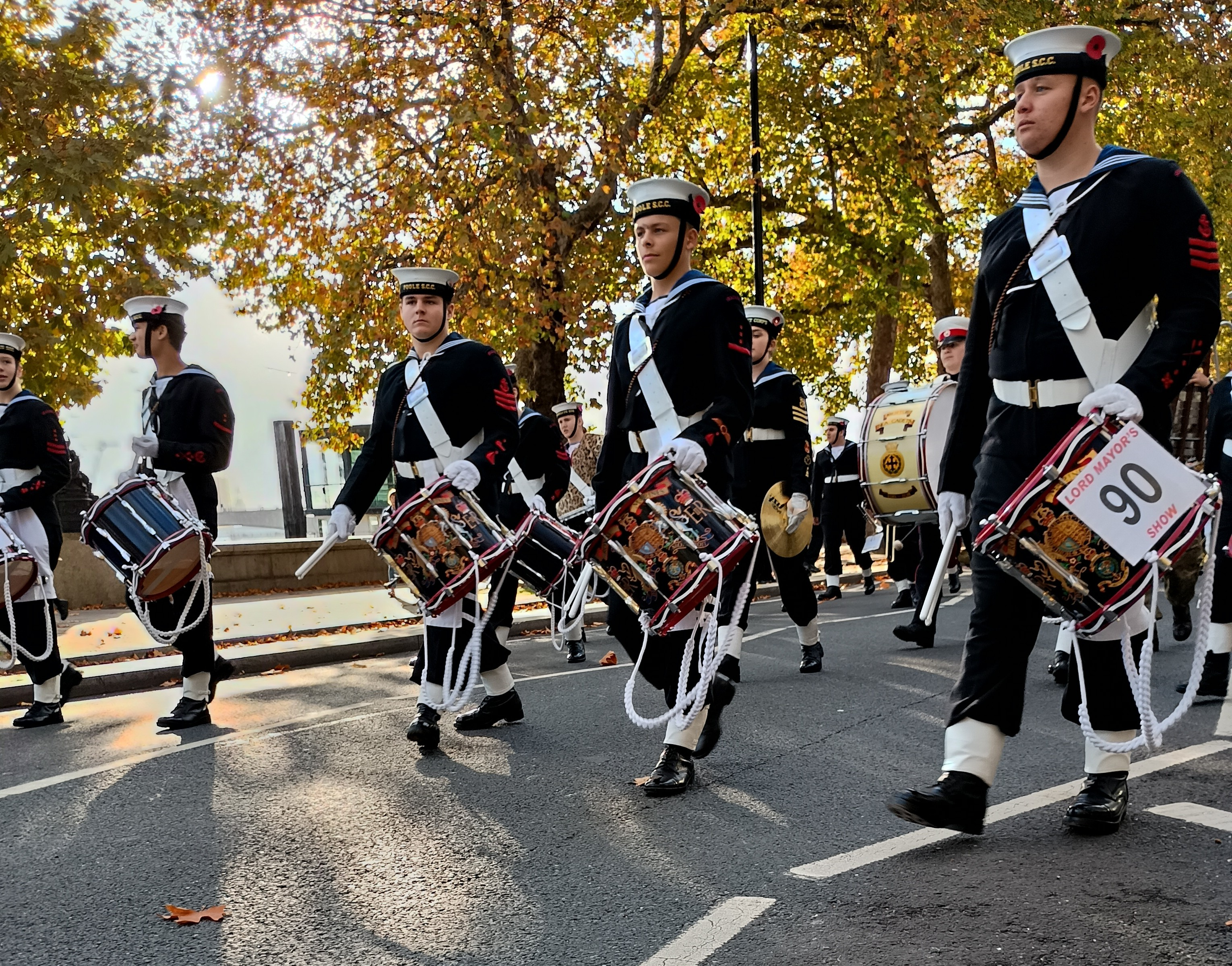
Members of the London Area Sea Cadet Corps band taking part in the Lord Mayor's Show, London, on 8 November 2025.

=== Junior Sea Cadets ===
For 9 to 12-year-olds, Junior Cadets have their own training programme and uniform, based on a more practical version of the Sea Cadets training programme.

=== Sea Cadets ===
For 12 to 18-year-olds, young people can join as a Sea Cadet and work their way up through the training programme.

=== Royal Marines Cadets ===
For 13 to 18-year-olds, the Sea Cadets has detachments of Royal Marines Cadets.

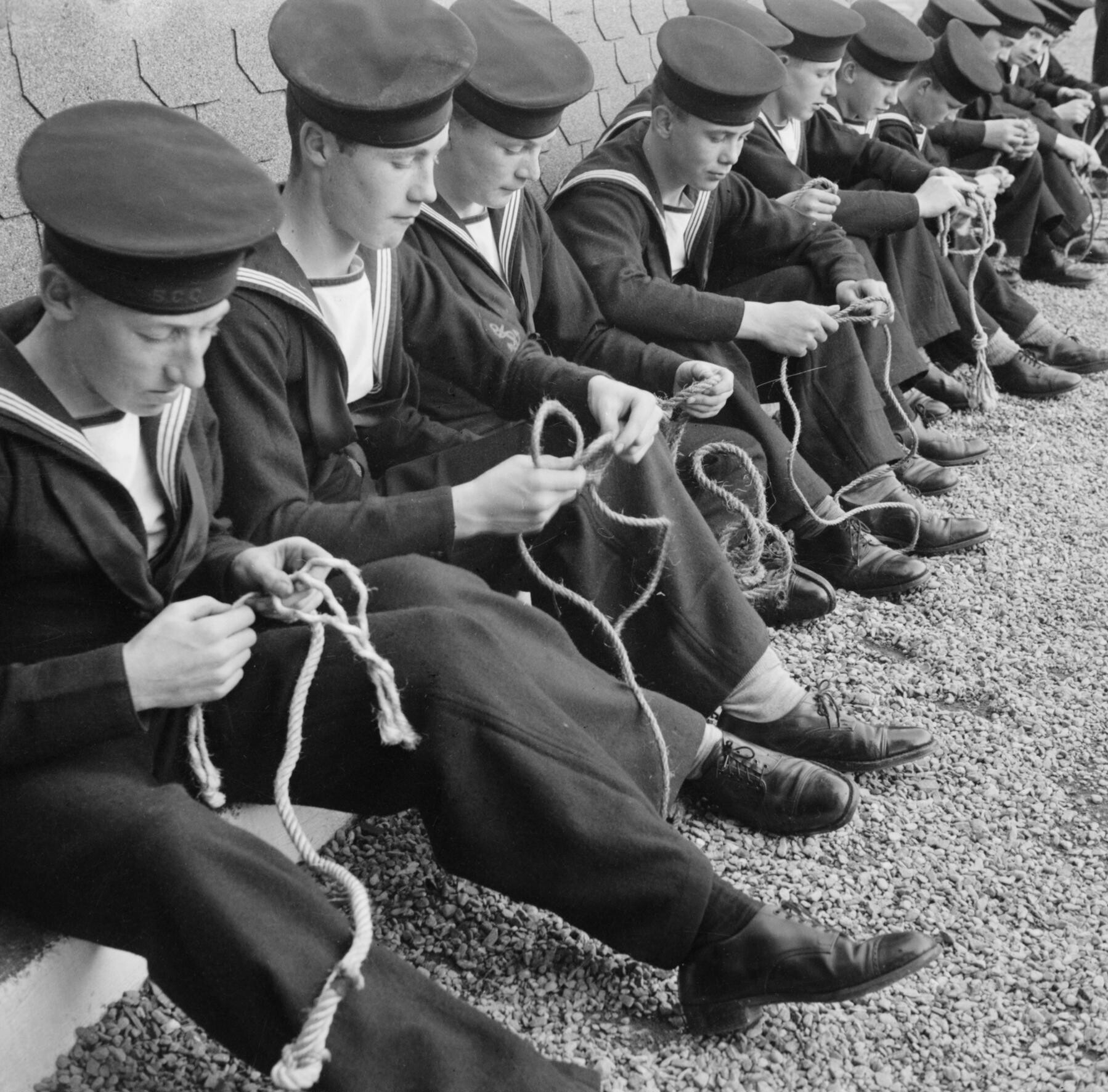
Sea Cadets training on HMS Undine, 1943

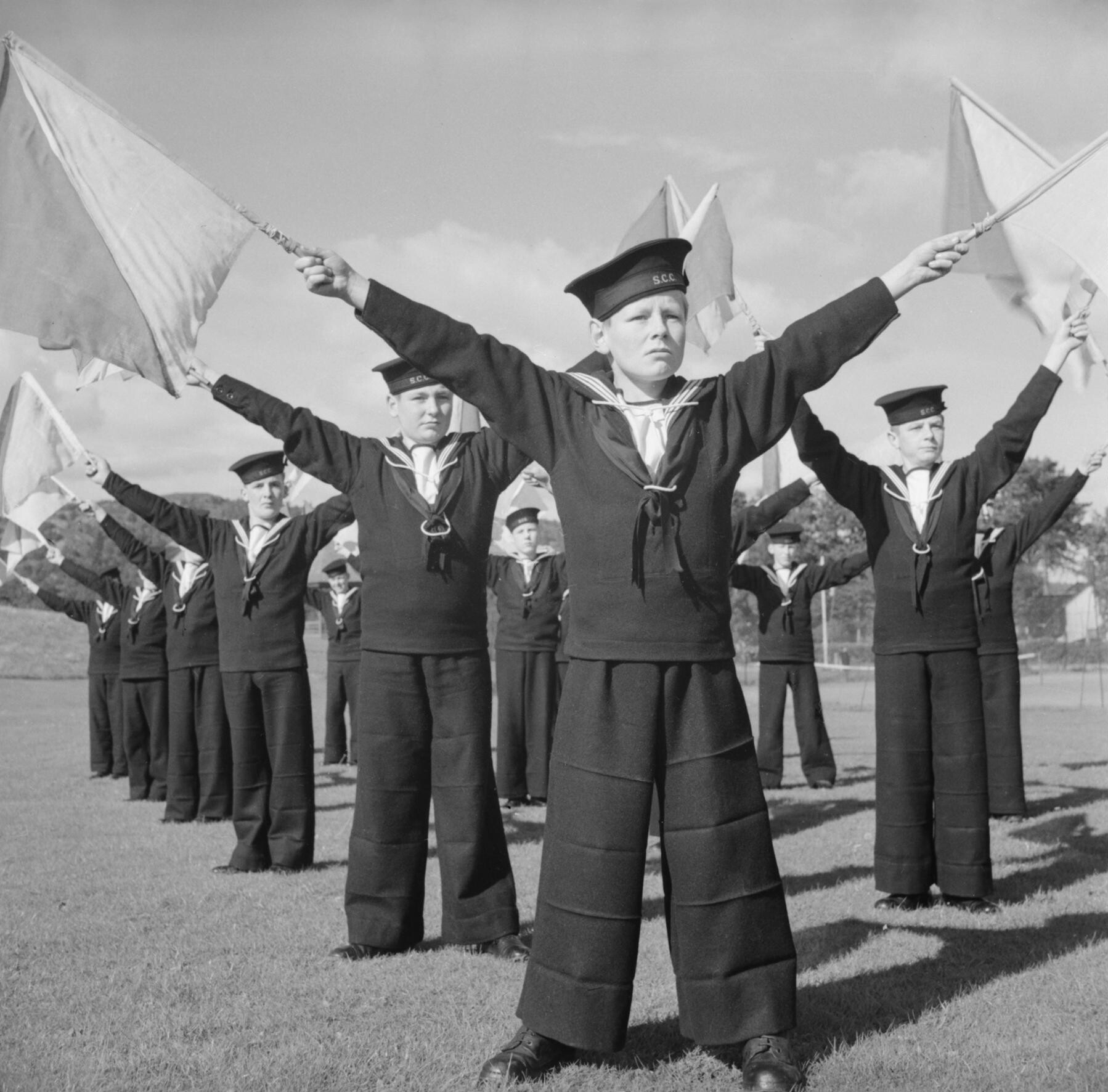
Sea Cadets practice semaphore during signalling class, 1943

== Structure and organisation ==
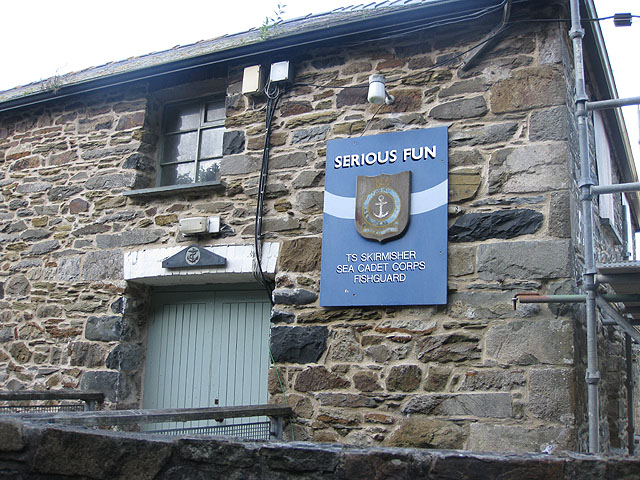
Sea Cadets, Fishguard

The headquarters of Sea Cadets are in Lambeth, South London. The country is divided into six areas:

- Eastern (including Malta)
- Northern (including Northern Ireland and Bermuda)
- Southern (including the Channel Islands & Falkland Islands)
- North West (including the Isle of Man)
- London
- South West

The Sea Cadet Corps is one of the community cadet forces sponsored and supported by the Ministry of Defence. The charity is governed by the trustees of the Marine Society & Sea Cadets (MSSC), with day-to-day management delegated to its chief executive and senior management team.

In July 2026, the Royal Navy informed MSSC that, subject to further work, it intended to withdraw from the existing Memorandum of Understanding and end the current Grant in Aid arrangement from October 2027. The Royal Navy outlined a possible future model in which it would take a more direct role in the governance and oversight of the Sea Cadet Corps, with MSSC continuing as a charitable partner supporting specialist activities. At the time of the announcement, no future operating or transition model had been agreed.

Volunteers fulfil roles such as water sports instructors, fundraisers, administrative staff, etc. Sea Cadets has both uniformed adult volunteers and non-uniformed adult volunteers.

== Training regime ==
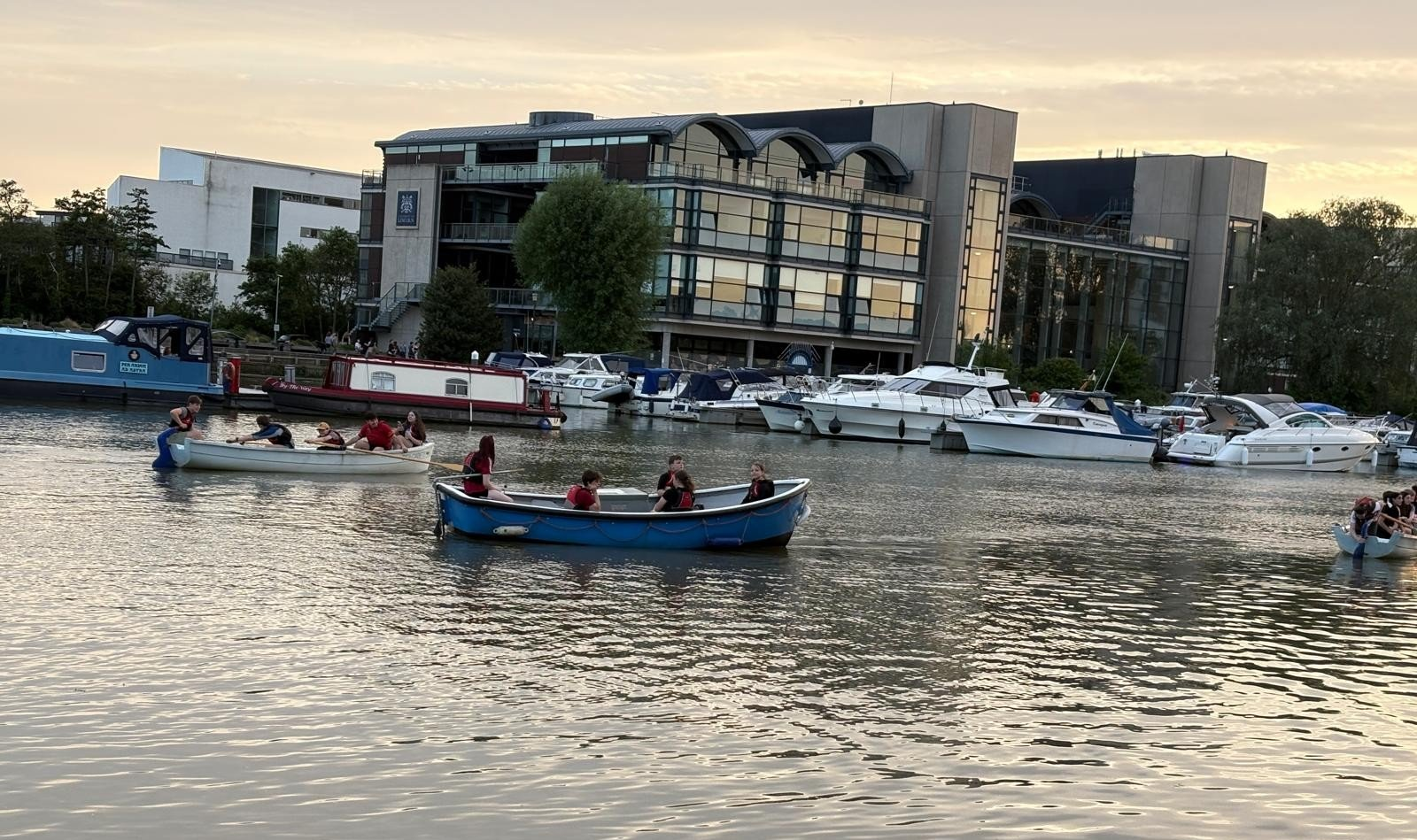
Sea Cadets undertaking boating training on the River Witham in Lincoln, United Kingdom.

Skills learned in a cadet's time in the Sea Cadets fall into four groups: (i) unit section, (ii) waterborne section, (iii) community and citizenship section, and (iv) outdoor and recreation section.

== Ranks and rates ==
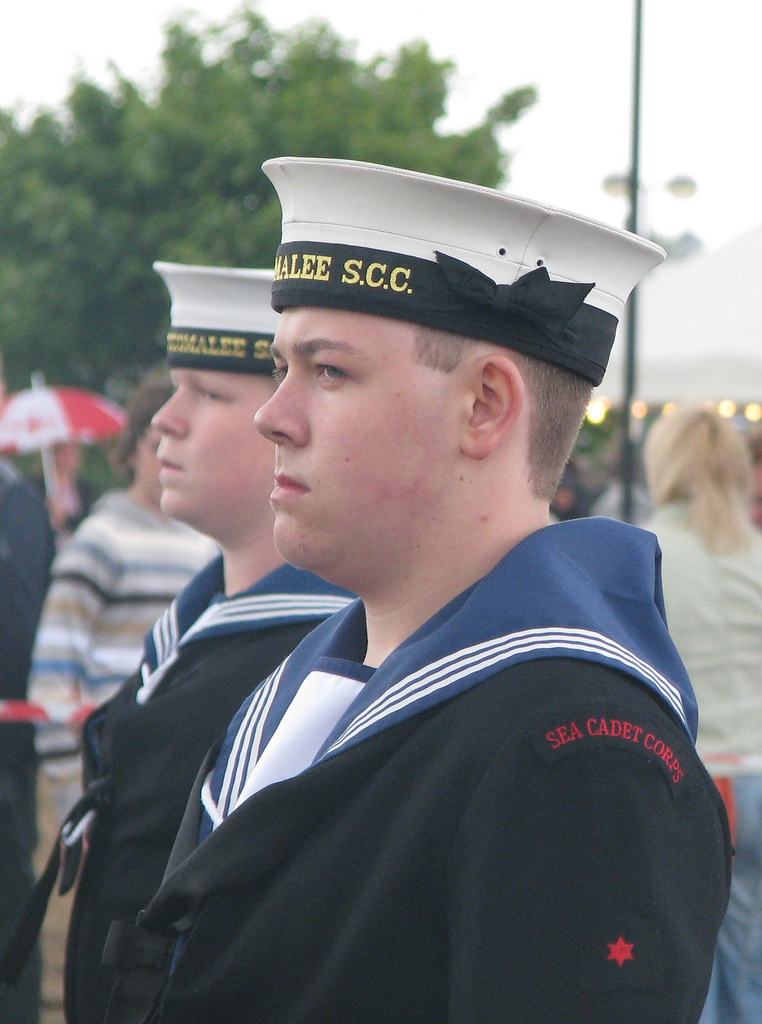
A Cadet 1st Class in No.1 Uniform

From new entry through to able cadet, Sea Cadets are promoted based on their completion of various task-based modules. The ranks to progress through are: new entry, cadet, cadet 1st class, ordinary cadet, and able cadet. The non-commissioned officer ranks are leading cadet and petty officer cadet.

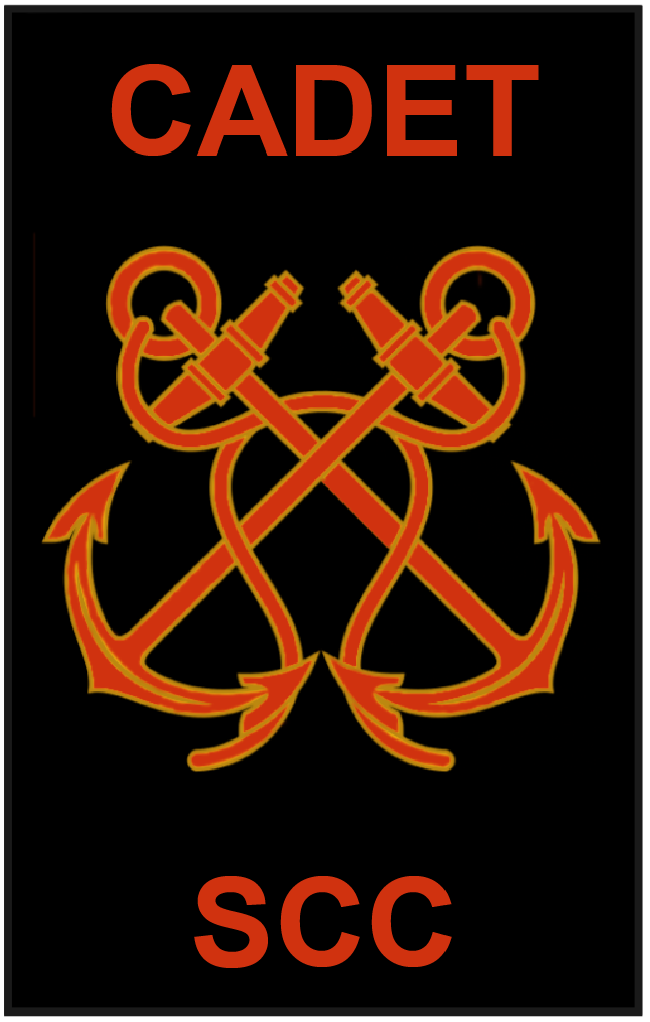
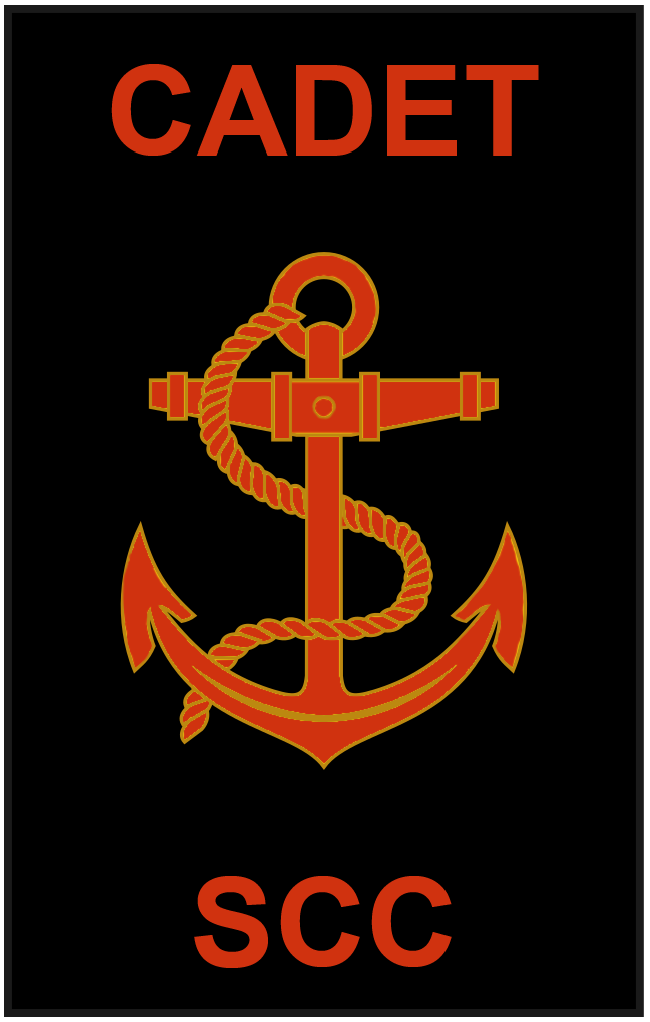
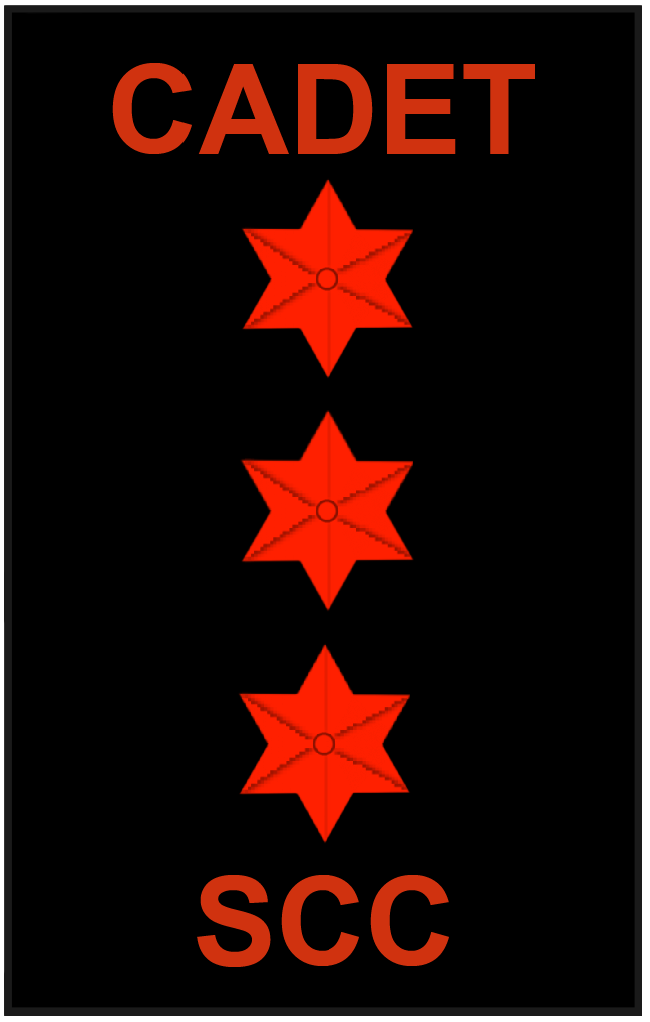
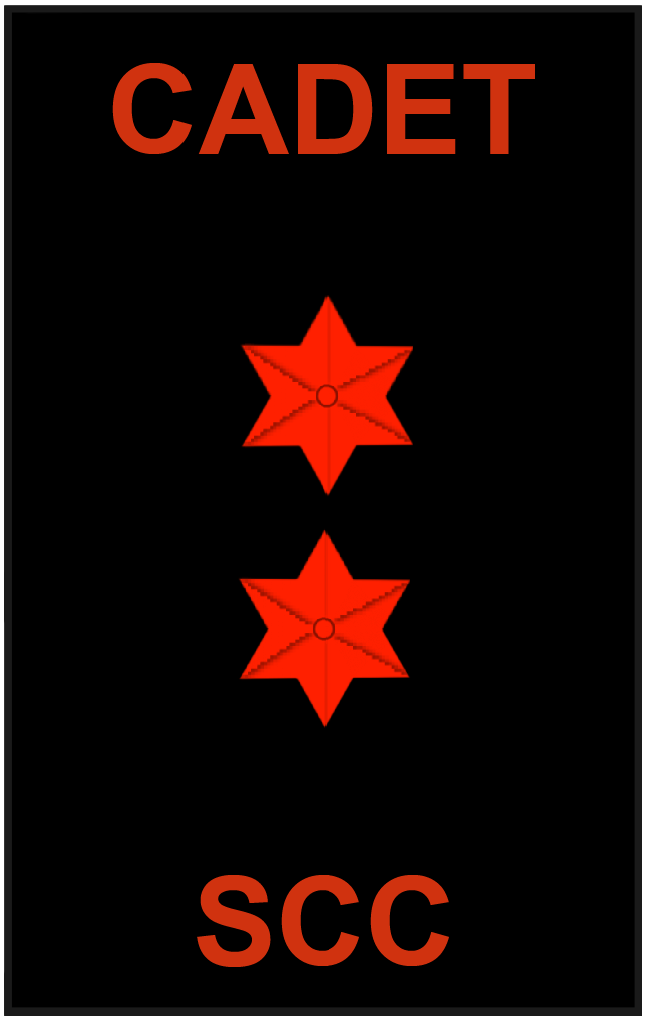
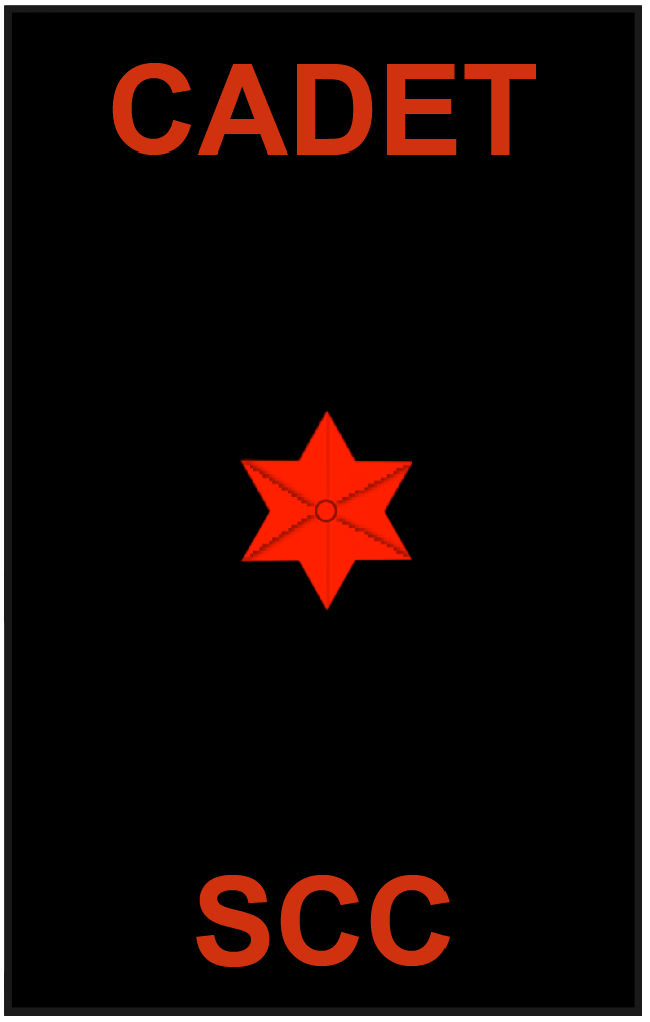
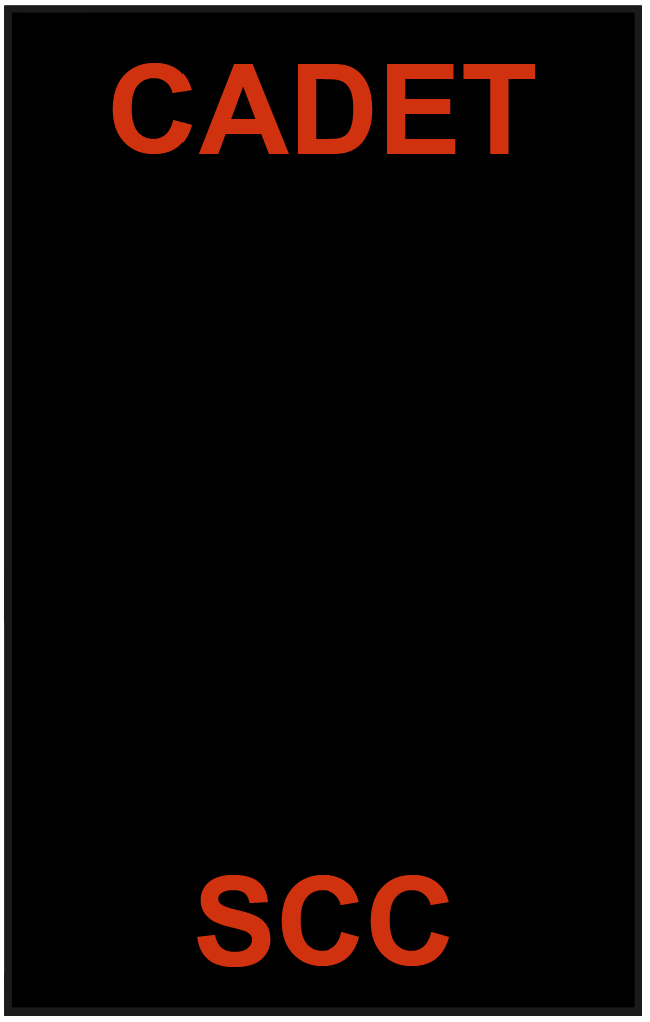
Sea Cadets Corps							No insignia
Sea Cadets Corps	Petty officer cadet	Leading cadet	Able cadet	Ordinary cadet	Cadet 1st class	Cadet	New entry
Sea Cadets Corps	POC	LC	AC	OC	CFC	CDT	NE
Royal Marines Cadets (Part of the SCC)						No insignia	No insignia
Royal Marines Cadets (Part of the SCC)	Cadet sergeant	Cadet corporal	Cadet lance corporal			Marine cadet	Marine cadet recruit
Royal Marines Cadets (Part of the SCC)	CDT SGT	CDT CPL	CDT LCPL			MC	MCR

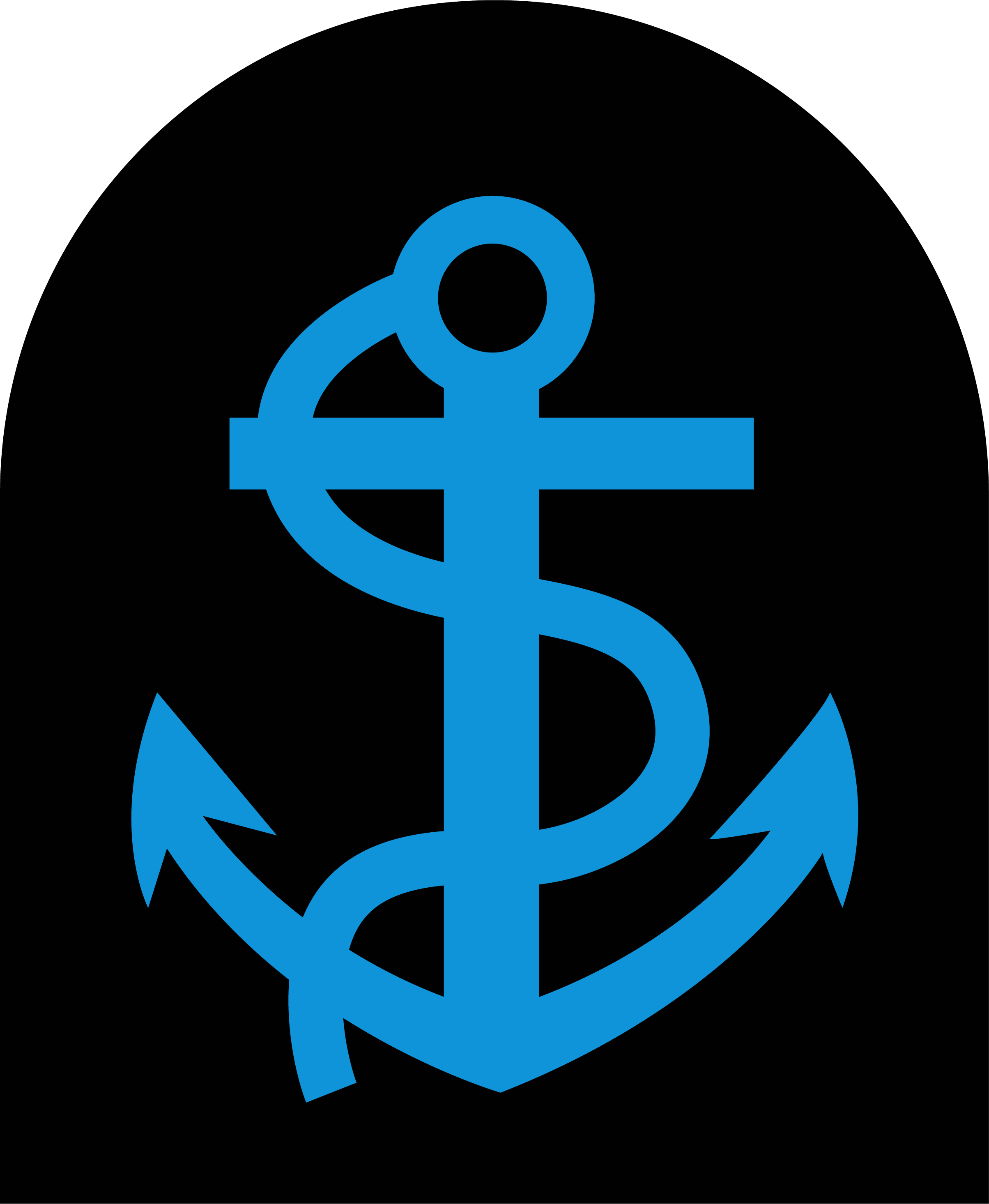
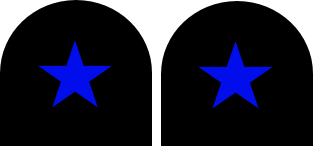
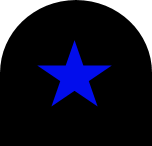
Junior Sea Cadets Corps
Junior Sea Cadets Corps	Leading junior cadet	Able junior cadet	Junior cadet first class	Junior cadet
Junior Sea Cadets Corps	LJC	AJC	JCFC	JC

Sea Cadet Unit Officers (NCOs)	Warrant Officer 1 (SCC) RNR	Warrant Officer 2 (SCC) RNR	Chief Petty Officer (SCC)	Petty Officer (SCC)	Probationary Petty Officer (SCC)	Civilian Instructor (SCC)
Rank Slide						
Royal Marine Unit Officers (NCOs)	Warrant Officer 1 (SCC) RMR	Warrant Officer 2 (SCC) RMR	Colour Sergeant (SCC)	Sergeant (SCC)	Probationary Sergeant (SCC)	Civilian Instructor (SCC)
Rank Slide						No Rank Slide or

Officers are commissioned under the Cadet Forces Commission.

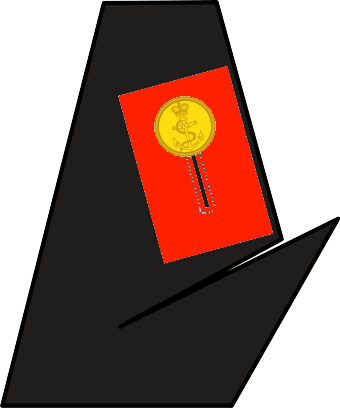
Midshipman in the Sea Cadets formerly used the insignia for Midshipman in the Royal Navy Volunteer Reserve.

Sea Cadet Corps officers	Captain (SCC) RNR (Note: Currently does not exist as a volunteer rank within the Sea Cadets)	Commander (SCC) RNR	Lieutenant Commander (SCC) RNR	Lieutenant (SCC) RNR	Sub-Lieutenant (SCC) RNR	Midshipman (SCC) RNR
Insignia						
Royal Marine Cadet Corps officers		Lieutenant Colonel (SCC) RMR (Note: introduced August 2009)	Major (SCC) RMR	Captain (SCC) RMR	Lieutenant (SCC) RMR	Second Lieutenant (SCC) RMR
Insignia						

Another rank is Chaplain, they also commission under the Cadet Forces Commission.

Rank	Chaplain (SCC) RNR
Insignia	

=== Admiral and captain of the sea cadets ===
Picture	Admiral of the Sea Cadet Corps	Took office	Left office	Time in office	Ref.
King George VI	Admiral; King George VI	1942	6 February 1952	10 years, 1 month	
Prince Philip, Duke of Edinburgh	Admiral; Prince Philip, Duke of Edinburgh	6 February 1952	1992	39 years, 10 months	
Prince Andrew, Duke of York	Admiral; Prince Andrew, Duke of York	1992	8 December 2019	27 years, 11 months	
None	None	8 December 2019	2021	1 year, 1 month	
Anne, Princess Royal	Admiral; Anne, Princess Royal	2021	present	5 years, 9 months	

Picture	Captain Sea Cadets	Took office	Left office	Time in office	Ref.
Mark Windsor	Captain; Mark Windsor	2009	5 July 2013	4 years, 6 months	
Jonathan Holloway	Captain; Jonathan Holloway	5 July 2013	30 April 2015	1 year, 9 months	
Phil Russell	Captain; Phil Russell	30 April 2015	21 July 2021	6 years, 2 months	
Neil Downing	Captain; Neil Downing	21 July 2021	19 December 2025	4 years, 4 months	
Hannah MacKenzie	Captain; Hannah MacKenzie	19 December 2025	present	9 months	

== Uniform ==
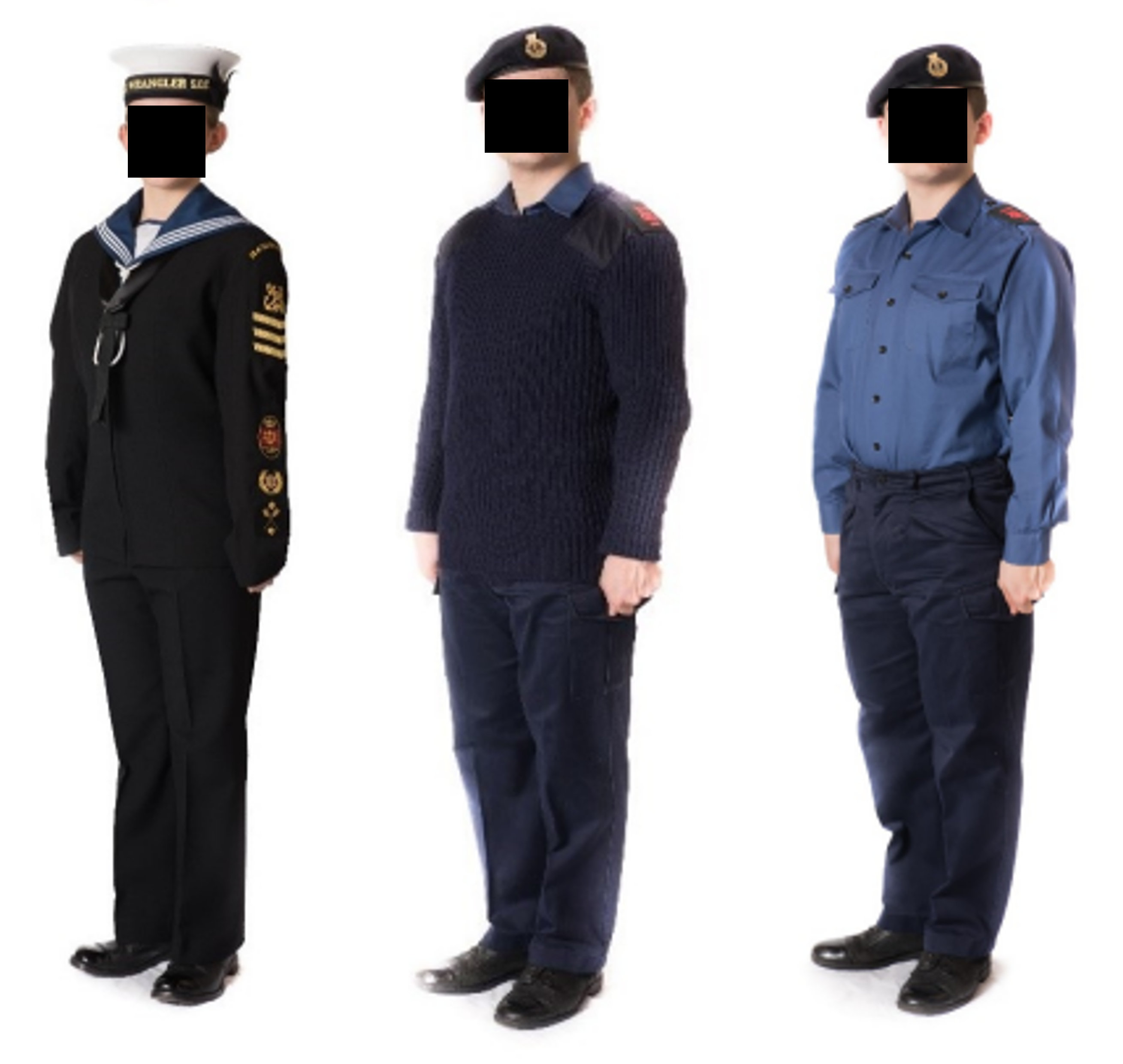
No. 1s (Left) and No. 8 AWD (being replaced in 2024 with No.4s) with pullover (centre) and in shirtsleeves (right)

Cadets are issued two uniforms. Some units ask for a deposit for uniforms that is returned after the uniform is given back. The primary uniforms that cadets receive are:

- No. 1s (Formal Dress) - Seaman's cap, blue class II jumper, blue Class II trousers, shirt uniform class II (white front), seaman's blue collar, black scarf assembly, lanyard, and black boots/shoes
- Royal Navy Personal Clothing System (RNPCS) No. 4 Dress (General Duty Rig) – Replacing the No. 8 Action Work Dress, this involves Navy blue beret, blue PCS jacket, black t-shirt, blue belt, blue PCS trousers, black working boots, navy jersey, and an RN foul weather jacket

== Ships ==
=== Current offshore fleet ===
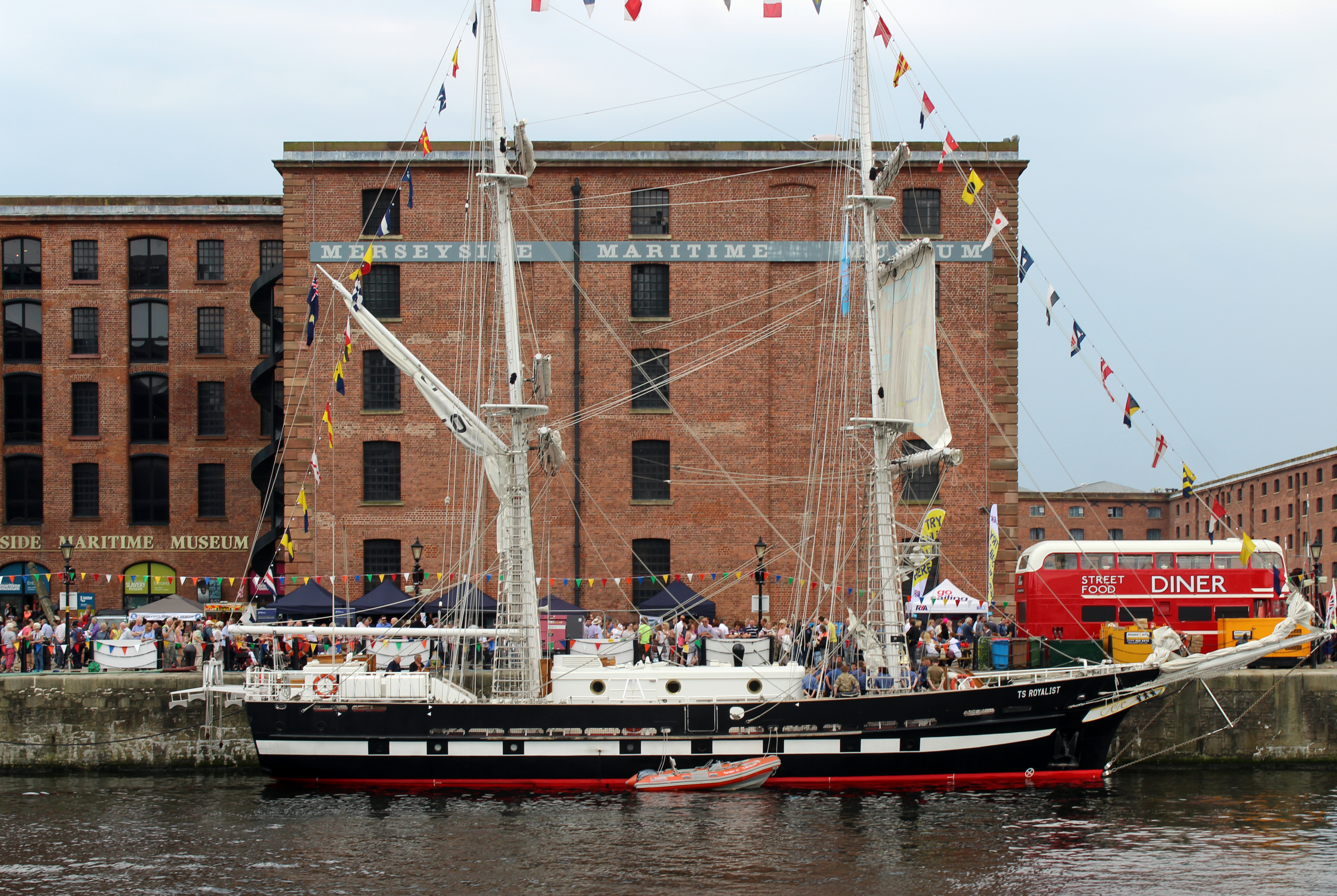
The Sea Cadet flagship TS Royalist moored outside the Merseyside Maritime Museum in Canning Dock, Liverpool, during the Three Festivals Tall Ship Regatta 2018

==== TS Royalist ====
TS Royalist, the Sea Cadet flagship, is a tall ship owned by the MSSC (Marine Society and Sea Cadets). She is used to providing week-long training courses for Sea Cadets and Royal Marines Cadets. The ship was launched in 2014 to replace the previous TS Royalist, which was over 40 years old when decommissioned. In 2013 there had been an appeal to replace the ageing flagship: £250,000 was needed this target was achieved in April 2013.

She is rigged as a 34m brig, with a sail area of 536 square metres (641 sq yd). Her draught is 3.25 metres (10 ft 8 in). The ship's hull is of high tensile steel, with her superstructure of glass reinforced plastic. She has a crew of eight, plus up to twenty-four Cadets and two adult trainees. Twelve passengers can also be carried.

==== TS City of London and TS Sir Stelios ====
TS City of London and TS Sir Stelios are the Sea Cadets' Rustler 42 yachts provided in 2017 and 2018 respectively; they replaced the Tradewind 35 yachts TS Vigilant and TS City Liveryman. They provide nationally-recognised RYA training for those wishing to gain qualifications and experience in yacht sailing.

==== TS John Jerwood and TS Jack Petchey ====
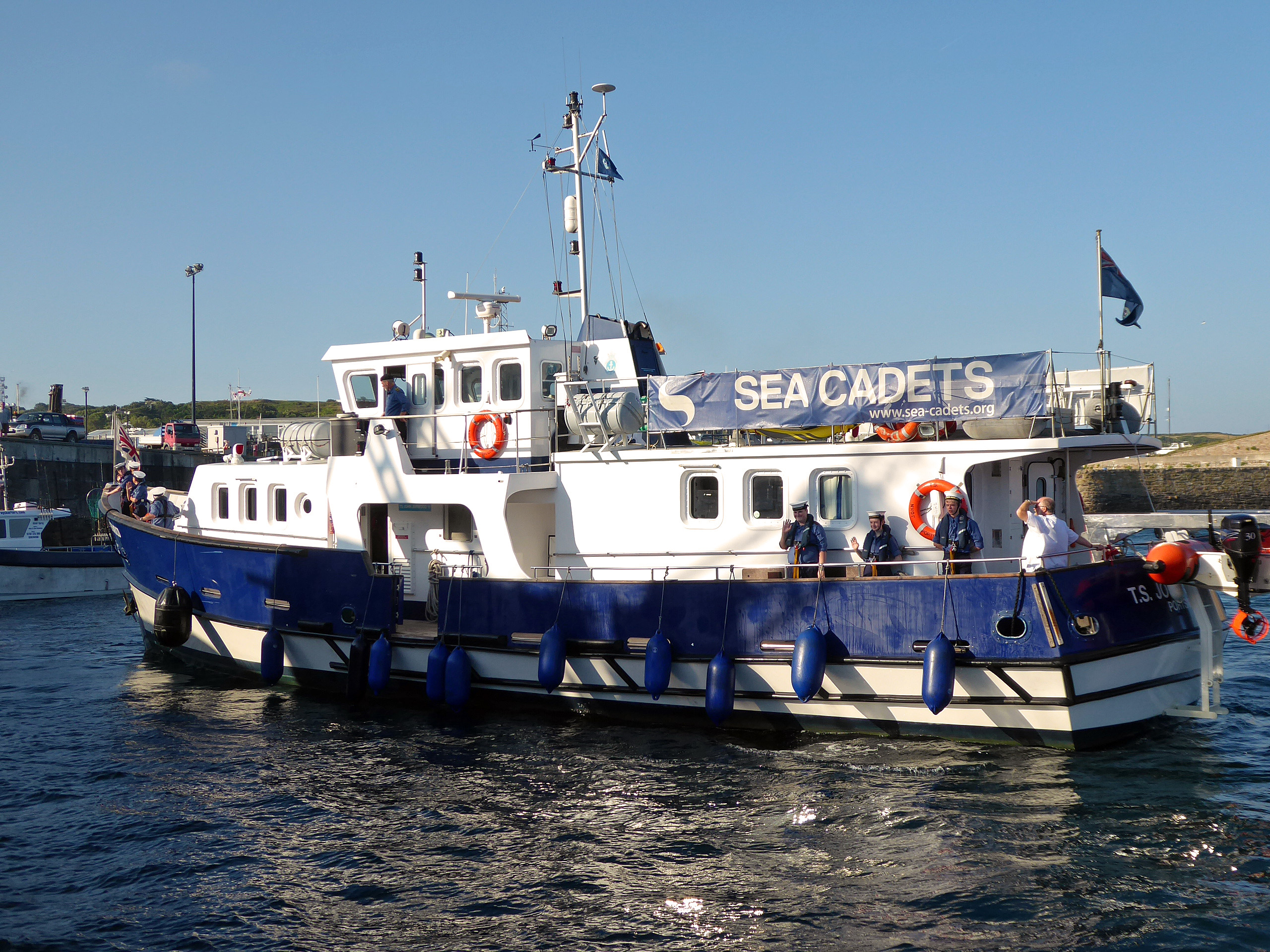
TS John Jerwood in Alderney on 15 August 2016.

These two vessels are the cadets' offshore powered training-ships. They are 24 m (78 ft 9 in) long and each cost about £2.6m. TS Jack Petchey is so named because the Jack Petchey Foundation donated £1m in order for it to be built. The Jerwood Foundation donated £1,216,700 for the construction of TS John Jerwood. The training ships can hold between 12-16 cadets, four permanent staff, and two CFAVs (cadet force adult volunteers) and provides an experience at sea focussing on deck work, navigation, bridge watchkeeping, cooking/stewarding, and marine engineering. Each vessel is fitted with twin Perkins Sabre Type M215C Turbo Diesel main engines, each providing 200 shp (150 kW) at 2,500 rpm.

=== Trinity 500 rowing boats ===
The Trinity 500 is a stable fixed-seat rowing boat, purpose-built for the Sea Cadets to deliver the full SCC Rowing Scheme. The boat has also been approved by British Rowing, to allow for the delivery of their Explore Rowing Scheme.

== Investigation into sexual abuse ==
In 2012 payouts made to victims of sexual abuse across all Cadet Forces totalled £1,475,844. In 2013 payouts totalled £64,782, and in 2014 payouts totalled £544,213.

In 2017, a Panorama episode entitled "Cadet Abuse Cover-Up" highlighted sexual abuse cases in the British Cadet Forces. In a 1979 case of sexual abuse of a 14-year-old cadet in Hertfordshire, the boy's parents were dissuaded from reporting the offender to police by Sea Cadet officers in full uniform, who had visited their home. The offender was neither dismissed or suspended but instead promoted to oversee 10 cadet units in London. Further historical cases have been investigated with settlements being made. In the years 2012 to 2017 there were 28 allegations of sexual abuse made against SCC volunteers, including historical allegations. All 28 offenders were dismissed and referred to the police.

== See also ==
Other elements of the Community Cadet Forces

- Royal Marines Cadets
- Army Cadet Force
- Air Training Corps

Other MoD sponsored cadet forces

- Combined Cadet Force
- Volunteer Cadet Corps

Other Sea Cadet organisations

- Australian Navy Cadets
- Bermuda Sea Cadet Corps
- Royal Canadian Sea Cadets
- Hong Kong Sea Cadet Corps
- New Zealand Sea Cadet Corps
- United States Naval Sea Cadet Corps

Related articles

- Marine Society and Sea Cadets
- Reserve Forces and Cadets Association
- Cadet Vocational Qualification Organisation (CVQO)
- Laurie Brokenshire
- Girls' Nautical Training Corps
- National Association of Training Corps for Girls
