= List of nurse-politicians =

Nurses have a long history of political activism; Florence Nightingale actively lobbied for better sanitation on the grounds of public health, and signed her name to petitions for women's suffrage in the United Kingdom. Lavinia Lloyd Dock, Lillian Wald, Ethel Gordon Fenwick and many others were similarly active. Despite this historic basis, there remain inherent tensions between nursing and politics, which have resulted in underrepresentation at the level of national political office. Nurses have been elected to serve as members of legislatures and have served as ministers of health.

The most prominent tension relates to gender. Nursing is one of the largest professions in the world, with approximately 29 million nurses worldwide in 2025. According to the World Health Organization, approximately 90 percent of the global nursing and midwifery workforce is female, and 10 percent is male, yet only 25 percent of leadership roles in health are held by women. Women remain similarly underrepresented in nationally elected parliaments; as at 2026, only 27.5 percent of parliamentarians were women, up from 11 percent in 1995. Historically, women's suffrage was not guaranteed globally; for example, Florence Nightingale did not have the right to vote within her lifetime. In the list below, the first identified nurse elected at a national level in politics was Kyllikki Pohjala in Finland as late as 1933.

There is also a difference in how the professions of nursing and politics are perceived. In a 2025 US Gallup Poll, 76 percent of the respondents said nurses were highly rated for honesty and ethical standards, making it the most trusted profession for 23rd consecutive year, while state office holders were rated at 14 percent and members of Congress were rated 8 percent. In 2024, the UK Ipsos veractity index rated nurses as the most trusted at 94 percent, against politicians as the least trusted at 11 percent.

There is a tension that comes from being a profession that provides care without fear or favour. The Nursing and Midwifery Council (NMC) in the UK recognises the right of individual nurses to hold political beliefs, also maintains that the NMC Code requires nurses to uphold standards of profession and not "impact their fitness to practise". In 2026 the UK government published a report recommending prohibiting National Health Service staff from wearing political badges on their uniforms.

There are some countries where this perception is being challenged; the American Association of Nurse Practitioners's Code of Ethics 9.5 states, "Nurses have a role at every level of the democratic process". In 2026, there are 4.3 to 5 million registered nurses in the United States. Despite their numbers, nurses remain under-represented in politics, with none serving in the United States Senate, 3 serving in the United States Congress, and 86 serving in state legislatures.

Beth Haney says that nurses are especially suited for political office, being highly educated, having the public trust, and demonstrating a sense of duty and responsibility through their profession. Monica Barfield notes that the low numbers of nurse-politicians is "a critical missed opportunity for health care reform and equitable policy development." The American Nurses Association Advocacy Institute, American Association of Nurse Practitioners Political Action Committee, Healing Nurses, the International Council of Nurses Global Nursing Leadership Institute, and Nurses on Board Coalition are national and global initiatives to prepare nurses for political engagement.

== List ==
Following is a list of notable trained or registered nurses who have served in government and/or been elected to national or subnational political offices, as of August 2026.

Dates of post(s)	Name	Country	Positions	Ref.
1933–1963	Kyllikki Pohjala	Finland	Parliament of Finland 1933–1962; Minister of Social Affairs and Health 1962–1963	
1949–1960	Gerda Höjer	Sweden	Member of Parliament 1949–1960	
1958–1959	Mary McAlister	United Kingdom	first nurse to be elected Member of Parliament 1958–1959	
1966–1979	Alli Vaittinen-Kuikka	Finland	Parliament of Finland 1966–1979	
1970–1977	Jennifer Musa	Pakistan	Member of Parliament 1970–1977	
1978–1982	Carmen A. Kasperbauer	Guam	senator in the Legislature of Guam 1978–1982	
1984–1993	Rosita Butterfield	Turks and Caicos Islands	Parliament of the Turks and Caicos Islands 1984–1991; Speaker of the House in 1991–1993	
1984–2004	Lucie Pépin	Canada	Member of Parliament 1984–1988; appointed to the upper house, 1997–2011; speaker pro tempore 2002–2004	
1989–1993	Anna Knysok	Poland	Sejm 1989–1993, Deputy Minister of Health 1997–2001	
1989–2005	John Alvheim	Norway	Member of Parliament 1989–2005	
1991–2007	Maija Rask	Finland	Parliament of Finland 1991–2007; Minister of education 1999–2003	
1993–1997	Margaret Bridgman	Canada	Member of Parliament 1993–1997	
1992–2023	Eddie Bernice Johnson	United States	United States House of Representatives 1992–2023; first nurse elected to the United States Congress; chair of the Congressional Black Caucus; chair of the House Committee on Science, Space and Technology	
1993–2008	Jill Pettis	New Zealand	New Zealand Parliament 1993–2008	
1994–2002	Nalin Pekgul	Sweden	Member of Parliament 1994–2002	
1994–2009	Beatrice Marshoff	South Africa	Parliament of South Africa 1994–1999	
1996–1998	Jill White	New Zealand	New Zealand Parliament 1996–1998	
1996-2015	Carolyn McCarthy	United States	United States House of Representatives 1996-2015	
1999–2015	Leena Rauhala	Finland	Parliament of Finland 1999–2015	
2002–2008	Lynne Pillay	New Zealand	New Zealand Parliament 2002–2008	
2004–2012	Juliana Azumah-Mensah	Ghana	Parliament of Ghana 2004–2012; Minister for Tourism 2009; Minister for Women and Children's Affairs 2010–2012	
2004–2014	Laurie Harding	United States	New Hampshire House of Representatives 2004–2014	
2005–2013	Laila Dåvøy	Norway	Member of the Storting 2005–2013; Minister of Children and Family Affairs 2001–2005; Ministry of Government Administration, Reform and Church Affairs 1999–2000	
2005–2017	Sonja Mandt	Norway	Storting 2005–2017	
2005–2023	Nadine Dorries	United Kingdom	Member of Parliament 2005–2023; Minister of State for Patient Safety, Suicide Prevention and Mental Health 2020-2021; Secretary of State for Digital, Culture, Media and Sport 2021–2022	
2005–2010	Jim Devine	United Kingdom	Member of Parliament 2005–2010	
2005–2012	Judith Adams	Australia	Member of the Australian Senate 2005–2012	
2005–2019	Anne Milton	United Kingdom	Member of Parliament 2005–2019; Lord Commissioner of the Treasury 2012–2014; Vice-Chamberlain of the Household 2014–2015; Minister for Women 2017–2018; Minister of State for Skills and Apprenticeships 2017–2019	
2006–2011	Angufiru Margaret	Uganda	Parliament of Uganda 2006–2011	
2007–2015	Özlem Cekic	Denmark	Member of the Folketing 2007–2015	
2007–2015	Merja Kuusisto	Finland	Parliament of Finland 2007–2015	
2007–2015	Sebahat Tuncel	Turkey	Grand National Assembly of Turkey 2007–2015	
2008–2021	Cathy McLeod	Canada	Member of Parliament 2008–2021	
2009–to date	Licia Ronzulli	Italy	Member of the European Parliament 2009–2014; Senate of the Republic 2018–to date	
2009–2013	Tove-Lise Torve	Norway	Storting 2009–2013; member of The Justice Committee	
2009–2014	Josefa Andrés Barea	Spain	Member of the European Parliament representing Spain	
2009–2025	Olaug Bollestad	Norway	Member of the Storting 2009–2025; Minister of Agriculture and Food 2019–2021; Minister of Children and Families 2021	
2011–2019	Thyra Frank	Denmark	Member of the Folketing 2011–2019; Minister for Elderly Affairs 2016–2019	
2011–2019	Christine Moore	Canada	Member of Parliament 2011–2019	
2011–to date	Sirið Stenberg	Faroe Islands	Member of the Løgting 2011–to date; Minister of Health 2015–2019; Minister of Social Affairs and Culture 2022–to date	
2013–to date	Emmi Zeulner	Germany	Member of the Bundestag 2013-;	
2013–2021	Kristin Ørmen Johnsen	Norway	Member of the Storting 2013–2021; chair, Standing Committee on Family and Cultural Affairs 2017–2021	
2015–2024	Maria Caulfield	United Kingdom	Member of Parliament 2015–2024; Minister of State for Health 2022; Parliamentary Under-Secretary of State for Mental Health and Women's Health Strategy 2022–2024	
2015–	Marta Sibina Camps	Spain	Member of Congress of Deputies 2015–	
2015-2023	Isidro Martínez Oblanca	Spain	Member of Congress of Deputies 2015–2023.	
2016–2026	Clare Haughey	Scotland	Member of the Scottish Parliament 2016–2026; Minister for Mental Health 2018–2021; Minister for Children and Young People 2021–2023	
2016–2020	Polly Campion	United States	Member of the New Hampshire House of Representatives	
2017-to date	Claudia Moll	Germany	Member of the Bundestag 2017-; Commissioner for Long-Term Care at the Federal Ministry of Health in the government of Chancellor Olaf Scholz 2022-2025.	
2017–2021	Michelle Ballantyne	Scotland	Member of the Scottish Parliament	
2017–2022	Nadia Ramassamy	France	National Assembly	
2017–2019	Karen Lee	United Kingdom	Member of Parliament	
2018–to date	Salihe Aydeniz	Turkey	Grand National Assembly of Turkey 2018–to date	
2019–to date	Isabella Dageago	Nauru	Member of Parliament Nauru 2019–; Minister of Health 2019–2022; Deputy Speaker of Parliament 2025–to date	
2019–2024	Sarah Atherton	United Kingdom	Member of Parliament	
2019–to date	Lauren Underwood	United States	United States House of Representatives 2019–to date	
2020-2025	Peggy Vidot	Seychelles	Minister of Health	
2021–to date	Akanvariva Lydia Lamisi	Ghana	Parliament of Ghana 2021–to date	
2021–to date	Kathy Lie	Norway	Member of the Storting 2021–to date	
2021–2026	Sylvia Bahireira Tumwekwase	Uganda	Parliament of Uganda 2021–2026	
2021–2025	Cori Bush	United States	United States House of Representatives 2021–2025	
2022–2026	Maria Durhuus	Denmark	Member of the Folketing 2022–2026	
2022–2026	Rosa Eriksen	Denmark	Member of the Folketing 2022–2026	
2022–to date	Paulette Hamilton	United Kingdom	Member of Parliament 2022–to date; interim chair and deputy chair of the Health and Social Care Select Committee 2025–	
2022–to date	Young Syefura Othman	Malaysia	Parliament of Malaysia 2022–to date	
2023–to date	Jen Kiggans	United States	United States House of Representatives 2023–to date	
2023–to date	Evie Brennan	United States	Wyoming Senate 2023–to date	
2024–to date	Pat Cullen	United Kingdom	Member of Parliament 2024–to date	
2024–to date	Sojan Joseph	United Kingdom	Member of Parliament 2024–to date	
2024–to date	Kevin McKenna	United Kingdom	Member of Parliament 2024–to date	
2025–to date	Sheri Biggs	United States	United States House of Representatives 2025–to date	
2025–to date	Trish Cook	Australia	Australian House of Representatives 2025–to date	
2026–to date	Lise Müller	Denmark	Member of the Folketing 2026–to date	
2026–to date	Michelle Campbell	Scotland	Member of the Scottish Parliament 2026–to date	
2026–to date	Nancy Theriault	United States	Maine House of Representatives 2026–to date	
2026–to date	Jonas Lindberg	Sweden	Member of Parliament 2026–to date	
2027–to date	Megan Coy	United States	Ohio House of Representatives 2027–to date	
2027–to date	Erika Yoney	United States	Minnesota House of Representatives 2027–to date	
2027–to date	Sara Bertschinger	United States	Minnesota House of Representatives 2027–to date	
