= List of hospitals in Jamaica =

This is a list of hospitals in Jamaica, organized by county and parish. The hospitals are located across Jamaica's three counties Surrey, Middlesex, and Cornwall and include both public and private facilities.

== Surrey County ==
=== Kingston and Saint Andrew ===
- Chinese Sanitarium
- Hope Institute
- Andrews Memorial Hospital (private)
- Bellevue Hospital (BVH)
- Bustamante Hospital for Children (BHC)
- El Shaddai Medical Centre Jamaica
- Gynae Associates Hospital (private)
- Heart Institute of the Caribbean
- Kingston Public Hospital (KPH)
- Maxfield Park Medical Center
- Medical Associates Hospital (private)
- National Chest Hospital (NCH)
- Nuttall Memorial Hospital (private)
- Sir John Golding Rehabilitation Center
- St. Joseph's Hospital
- University Hospital of the West Indies (UHWI)
- Victoria Jubilee Hospital (VJH)

=== Portland Parish ===
- Buff Bay Hospital
- Port Antonio Hospital

=== Saint Thomas Parish ===
- Princess Margaret Hospital

== Middlesex County ==
=== Clarendon Parish ===
- Chapelton Hospital
- Lionel Town Community Hospital
- May Pen Hospital

=== Manchester Parish ===
- Hargreaves Hospital (Private)
- Mandeville Hospital
- Percy Junor Hospital

=== Saint Ann Parish ===
- Alexandria Community Hospital
- St. Ann's Bay Hospital

=== Saint Catherine Parish ===
- Linstead Hospital
- Spanish Town Hospital

=== Saint Mary Parish ===
- Annotto Bay Hospital
- Port Maria Hospital

== Cornwall County ==
=== Saint Elizabeth Parish ===
- Black River Hospital

=== Saint James Parish ===
- Cornwall Regional Hospital (CRH)
- Doctors Hospital (private)
- Hospiten Montego Bay (private)
- Montego Bay Hospital (private)
- Trinity Mall Medical (private)
- St James Children Hospital (public)

=== Trelawny Parish ===
- Falmouth Hospital (Falmouth, Jamaica)

=== Westmoreland ===
- Royale Medical Centre (private)
- Omega Medical Hospital (private)
- Savanna-la Mar Public Hospital

=== Hanover ===
- Noel Holmes Hospital

== See also ==
- Hospitals in Jamaica
- Lists of hospitals in North America
