= Rosita Butterfield =

Turks and Caicos politician (1936–2015)

Rosita Beatrice Butterfield
- Born: Rosita Beatrice Missick; 14 November 1936; Kew, North Caicos, Turks and Caicos Islands
- Died: 10 January 2015 (aged 78); Nassau, Bahamas
- Other names: Rosita Butterfield, Rosita Beatrice Butterfield
- Occupations: nurse, politician, businesswoman
- Years active: 1949–2015
- Known for: first woman Speaker of the House of Assembly of the Turks and Caicos Islands
- Spouse: Albray V. Butterfield Sr. (m. 22 March 1961)

Rosita Beatrice Missick-Butterfield, MBE (14 November 1936 – 10 January 2015) was a Turks and Caicos Islander who served as the first woman Member of Parliament and Speaker of the House of Assembly of the Turks and Caicos Islands.

Beginning her career as a teacher, after a brief period, Butterfield moved into nursing, earning her RGN and midwife certifications in Jamaica. After nearly a decade of nursing in the United States, she returned to Turks and Caicos and was a clinic nurse for eight years before entering the family business. In the 1980s, she was on various public service boards before running for election in 1984. She was the first woman elected as part of the Legislative Assembly and after one term was continuously appointed to serve until 1991, when she became the first woman elected as Speaker of the Legislative Assembly. After a three-year term as Speaker, she left public office to resume her duties as chief executive officer of the family firm and philanthropic efforts.

== Biography ==
Rosita Beatrice Missick was born on 14 November 1936 in Kew, on North Caicos in the Turks and Caicos Islands to Savelitta A. (née Higgs) and Isaiah V. Missick. She attended the Kew Elementary School and the Bottle Creek Elementary School before finishing her secondary education at Grand Turk Secondary School. Upon completion of her secondary schooling, Missick completed a workshop in Grand Turk to earn her teaching credentials and briefly taught at Kew Elementary School.

== Career ==
=== Nursing ===
In 1953, she changed direction and was hired at Grand Turk Hospital as part of the staff. Four years later, Missick received a scholarship and attended registered nursing training in Jamaica at the Kingston Public Hospital and the University College Hospital, now the University Hospital of the West Indies. She earned her qualification as a registered general nurse (RGN) and returned to Grand Turk Hospital for two years. Deciding to add midwifery training, Missick enrolled for training at Victoria Jubilee Hospital in Kingston, Jamaica. She graduated with a competency to deliver babies without a doctor's supervision and honors, having earned the Matron's Prize, for best overall student; the Chief Surgeon's Prize, for the most efficient surgical student nurse; and the Evelyn Pierce Medical Nursing Book for night duty service excellence.

On 22 March 1961, Missick married Albray V. Butterfield Sr. and the couple soon moved to Florida. Missick-Butterfield began working at Wuesthoff Hospital, as well as at the Sunny Pines Nursing Home, both in Rockledge, Florida. In addition to her work, she continued her education, completing her certification in psychiatric nursing at Daytona Beach Junior College in 1968. She also attended Brevard Junior College, studying business administration. They returned to the Turks and Caicos in 1971 and Butterfield accepted a position as nurse in charge of the Providenciales Clinic, until her retirement in 1978.

In 1978, she became a director and secretary of the Butterfield Gold Group of Companies, a business started by her husband. Between 1982 and 1984, Butterfield was on the advisory committee of the Provo branch of the Immigration Committee, evaluating work permits for Providenciales Island. From 1983, she also was on various boards and committees for public welfare, including the Health Practitioner's Board, Public Service Advisory Board, Turks and Caicos Tourist Board, and as a social worker for the Welfare Department.

=== Politics ===
In 1984, Butterfield became the first woman elected as a Member of Parliament in the Turks and Caicos, as a representative for the constituency of Kew, North Caicos. In 1986, she was appointed as Deputy Speaker of the House, until 1988. Between 1987 and 1988, she acted as chair of the Employment Bill Committee. In 1988, she became an appointed Member of Parliament (called the Legislative Assembly at that time), representing the Progressive National Party and served in that capacity until 1991, when she was elected as the first woman Speaker of the House. In 1992, Butterfield was the title of Member of the Order of the British Empire (MBE) by Queen Elizabeth II. Between 1991 and 1993, while she was Speaker, Butterfield also was a Justice of the Peace in the Turks and Caicos Islands and acted as president of the Commonwealth Parliamentary Association, Turks and Caicos branch. After her term in politics ended, Butterfield returned to the family business, as chief executive officer.

== Private activities ==
Butterfield was Pastor of Faith Tabernacle Church Of God Turks and Caicos Islands and donated funds to build churches in Providenciales and North Caicos. She and her husband provided funds for the construction of a medical facility in Sandy Point, North Caicos. In addition to other philanthropic endeavors, Butterfield was involved in numerous activities related to education including providing scholarships, co-sponsoring the Inter-Island High School Spelling Bee, co-founding the Turks and Caicos Community College and founding the canteen of Clement Howell High School. She also founded the Soroptimist International club and established the Aglow International chapter in Providenciales.

Butterfield died on 10 January 2015 at Doctor's Hospital in Nassau, Bahamas and was given a state funeral on 5 February 2015 in Turks and Caicos.

== Sources ==
- Hewitt, Hermi Hyacinth (2002). Trailblazers in Nursing Education: A Caribbean Perspective, 1946–1986. Kingston, Jamaica: Canoe Press. ISBN 978-976-8125-78-1.
- "The Body of the First Female Speaker of the TCI is being handed over at Odyssey Airport at this hour…". Nassau, The Bahamas: Bahamas Press. 2 February 2015.
- "Parliamentary Election". South Base, Grand Turk, Turks & Caicos Islands: The Statistical Office. 1984.
- "Parliamentary Election". South Base, Grand Turk, Turks & Caicos Islands: The Statistical Office. 1988.
- "RBPF Bid Farewell to Dr. Rosita Butterfield, Turks and Caicos' Former Speaker". Nassau, The Bahamas: Royal Bahamas Police Force Press. 2 February 2015.
- "Dr. Rosita Beatrice Missick-Butterfield". Nassau, The Bahamas: Tribune 242. 16 January 2015.
- "The life and times of Dr Rosita Butterfield". Turks and Caicos Weekly News. Providenciales, Turks And Caicos Islands. 19 January 2015.
