= Gwendolyn Spencer =

Gwendolyn Omphroy-Spencer
- Born: Gwendolyn Euphemia Omphroy; 26 October 1916; Kingston, Colony of Jamaica, British Empire
- Died: 20 August 2015 (aged 98); Meadowbrook, Jamaica
- Other names: Gwendolyn Omphroy-Spencer, Gwendolyn Humphrey Spencer
- Occupations: nurse, midwife
- Known for: co-founder of the Jamaican Midwives' Association

Gwendolyn Spencer, OD (26 October 1916 – 20 August 2015) was a nurse and midwife, who co-founded the Jamaican Midwives' Association. An advocate for professionalism, she was instrumental in developing training programs for midwives and establishing a professional pay grade from the government for their services. She received the Order of Distinction for her contributions to healthcare in the country.

== Early life ==
Gwendolyn Euphemia Omphroy was born on 26 October 1916 at Victoria Jubilee Hospital (VJH) in Kingston, Jamaica to Violet (née Williams) Omphroy. From the age of twelve, Omphroy knew that she wanted to become a nurse. After completing her elementary education in Christiana, she attended Westwood High School in Trelawny Parish and went on to study nursing at Kingston Public Hospital. She completed her studies at Victoria Jubilee Hospital, graduating in 1945.

== Career ==
Upon her graduation, Omphroy began working as a midwife at VJH. In 1950, she married Egbert Spencer and the couple subsequently had three children: Wayne, Althea and Noel. Receiving a government scholarship, she left her children in care of her husband and went to London to complete a course in training midwives at the University of London. Graduating with a master's degree in 1956, she returned to Jamaica and became a tutoring sister at VJH. In 1960, along with Barbara Patterson, Pearlyn Raglan and Ena Wanliss, Spencer co-founded the Jamaican Midwives' Association, becoming the inaugural secretary-treasurer. She went on to serve as president of the organization for a decade and was a staunch advocate for recognition of midwives as trained medical professionals. In 1966, the organization gained membership in the International Confederation of Midwives, leading Spencer to travel to various countries like Canada, Germany, Japan, and Switzerland to improve the station of midwives worldwide. In 1969, she was appointed matron at VJH.

Retiring from VJH in 1976, Spencer was hired a few months later to work in the Ministry of Health on the family planning programme. With her retirement, the Midwives Training Programme was phased out at VJH. She led the struggle to have training continue, through the Health Ministry. As midwives were classified under the Ministry of Local Government, Spencer first had to convince the government that the classification of technical support services, did not take into account the specialized nature of midwifery. After presenting job descriptions and gaining approval from the Ministry of Health and Ministry of Public Service, midwives were given their own pay grade. In 1978, Spencer received the Order of Distinction for her contributions to maternal and child care in the country. By 1996, she had helped reestablish the midwife training programme at VJH and develop a program for Cornwall Regional Hospital in Montego Bay. She retired for the second time in 2002.

== Death and legacy ==
Spencer died on 20 August 2015 in Meadowbrook, Jamaica and was buried in Dovecot Cemetery. She is remembered for her pioneering development of midwifery in Jamaica and the founding of the Jamaican Midwives' Association.
