= Kingston Public Hospital =

- South East Regional Health Authority

Geography
- Location: North Street, Kingston, Jamaica
- Coordinates: 17°58′37″N 76°47′42″W

Organisation
- Type: District general

Services
- Standards: Type "A"
- Emergency department: Yes, Accident & Emergency (A&E)
- Beds: 475

History
- Opened: December 14, 1776

Links
- Website: serha.gov.jm/hospitals/kph
- Other links: List of hospitals in Jamaica

EKingston Public Hospital (KPH) is a public general hospital in Kingston, Jamaica. It is the oldest public hospital in Jamaica and is the main hospital in south eastern Jamaica. The hospital is operated by the South East Regional Health Authority on behalf of the Ministry of Health, Jamaica.

== History ==
Kingston Public Hospital was first opened on 14 December 1776. However, the institution was officially ratified on 21 December, 1776, when the Jamaica Assembly passed an Act (17 Geo. III c. 26) establishing the hospital. The hospital was originally located at the intersection of East and North Streets in Kingston, where a small hospital designated for slaves was converted into a male hospital and an old slave compound was converted into a female ward. Initially, KPH only treated patients from Jamaica’s white population, while the black slave population were treated on sugar plantations in what was then referred to as "hot houses" until emancipation in 1838, after which they began to be accepted by the hospital. Originally, KPH was designed as an almshouse as well as a hospital, and later became a mental asylum. However, the asylum was relocated to Rae Town, St Andrew in 1850, where it eventually became the Bellevue Hospital. In 1859, KPH began offering 24-hour service seven days per week. In 1936, the then Senior Medical Officer, Dr Arthur Westmorland, separated surgical from medical cases for the first time. Four new operating theatres were built in 1962, in addition to the two previously built in 1928. In 1963, the KPH paediatric ward was transferred to the premises of the former British Military Hospital to establish the Bustamante Hospital for Children. Since then, KPH has evolved into the largest multidisciplinary hospital in the Government Health Service as well as the largest trauma centre in the public hospital system.

== Services ==
Kingston Public Hospital is a 475-bed hospital located on North Street in Kingston. It is the largest hospital of its kind in the English-speaking Caribbean. The institution offers a variety of services including: diagnostic imaging; laboratory services; physiotherapy; physical rehabilitative services; dietary services; radiotherapy; general surgery; ear nose and throat surgery; ophthalmology; anaesthesia; intensive care pain management; gastroenterology; haematology; dialysis; endocrinology; rheumatology; psychiatry; and cardiology. The hospital also has an internal care medicine department with many subspecialties. The facility’s accident and emergency unit sees 200 to 300 persons per day, treating up to 90,000 patients annually, while its out-patient unit handles approximately 2000 cases daily. Additionally, the hospital performs approximately 90,000 surgical procedures annually. The services offered by the hospital include:

- Accident & Emergency (A&E)
- Anaesthesia and intensive care
- Dermatology
- Dietary
- Ear, Nose & Throat (ENT)
- Endocrinology
- Gastroenterology
- General Medicine
- General Surgery
- Haematology
- Infectious Disease
- Intensive Care Unit
- Medical laboratory
- Nephrology
- Neurology
- Neurosurgery
- Obstetrics & Gynaecology (O&G)
- Oncology
- Ophthalmology
- Orthopaedics
- Outpatient Clinics
- Pediatric Surgery
- Pediatrics
- Pharmacy
- Physiotherapy
- Plastic and Re-Constructive Service
- Psychiatry
- Radiology
- Radiotherapy
- Renal Dialysis
- Rheumatology
- Urology

== Notable people ==
- Rosita Butterfield, Turks and Caicos politician and midwife
- Mavis Gilmour, Jamaican medical practitioner and politician
- Syringa Marshall-Burnett, Jamaican nurse, educator and politician
- Gwendolyn Spencer, Jamaican nurse and midwife
- Sekhar Tam Tam, Indian medical doctor
