= Anna Knysok =

Polish politician (1951–2026)

Deputy Minister of Health
- In office 1997–2001

Member of the Sejm
- In office 1989–1993

Personal details
- Born: 19 July 1951 Chorzów, Poland
- Died: 27 July 2026 (aged 75)
- Party: SKL-RNP (2002–2003)
- Other political affiliations: PPChD (1999–2002); PChD (1990–1999)
- Education: University of Silesia in Katowice

Anna Maria Knysok (19 July 1951 – 27 July 2026) was a Polish politician, civil servant and psychologist. She was member of the Sejm (1989–1993) and served as Deputy Minister of Health (1997–2001).

== Life and career ==
Anna Knysok was born on 19 July 1951. She graduated from medical high school in 1970, and in 1980 from the Faculty of Psychology and Pedagogy of the University of Silesia in Katowice. From 1970 to 1990 she worked at the municipal hospital in Chorzów as a psychologist and nurse. In September 1980, she joined the Independent Self-Governing Trade Union "Solidarity", and after the imposition of martial law, she distributed underground publications. From April to July 1983 she was imprisoned and released under an amnesty. From 1982 to 1988 she co-organized masses for the homeland at the parish of St. Jadwiga of Silesia in Chorzów.

She was a member of the Sejm of the 10th term on behalf of the Solidarity Citizens' Committee and of the first term on behalf of the Christian Democrats (1989–1993). She ran unsuccessfully for re-election in 1993 on the list of the Catholic Electoral Committee "Ojczyzna". In 1997 she was re-elected on behalf of the Solidarity Electoral Action. In the Buzek cabinet, she held the position of Undersecretary of State in the Ministry of Health (1997–2001). Among other activities, she was a co-author of the health service reform introducing sickness funds. She was the government's plenipotentiary for the introduction of universal healthcare in modern Poland. She belonged to the Polish Christian Democratic Agreement (PChD), then to the Alliance of Polish Christian Democrats and the Conservative-People's Party – Movement of New Poland.

After leaving the government, she was the director of the municipal hospital in Chorzów, and from 2004 the deputy director of the Municipal Hospital Complex in Chorzów. She was a member of the Polish Tourist and Sightseeing Society, the Polish Nursing Association, the Polish Psychological Association, the Club of Catholic Intelligentsia, the Free Speech Association, and charitable organizations.

Knysok died on 27 July 2026, at the age of 75.

== Awards ==
In 2011 she received the Cross of Freedom and Solidarity.

== Bibliography ==
- "Strona sejmowa posła I kadencji".
- "Nota biograficzna w Encyklopedii Solidarności". Archived from the original on 20 October 2020.
- "Profil na stronie Biblioteki Sejmowej".

== See also ==
- List of nurse-politicians
