= Spanish Town Hospital =

Hospital in Spanish Town, Jamaica

- Location within Jamaica

Geography
- Location: Jamaica
- Coordinates: 17.9915°N 76.9469°W

Links
- Lists: Hospitals in Jamaica

Spanish Town Hospital is a hospital in Spanish Town, Jamaica. It is located near the city center.

== History ==
On April 9, 2026, Spanish Town Hospital received a bomb threat forcing the medical facility to be evacuated, police and firefighters searched the hospital and found no bomb. On June 1, 2026, the hospital received a second bomb threat at 11:49 P.M. that forced it to evacuate, the medical facility was searched and no bomb was found.
