= Devonport High School for Boys =

Grammar school in Plymouth, England

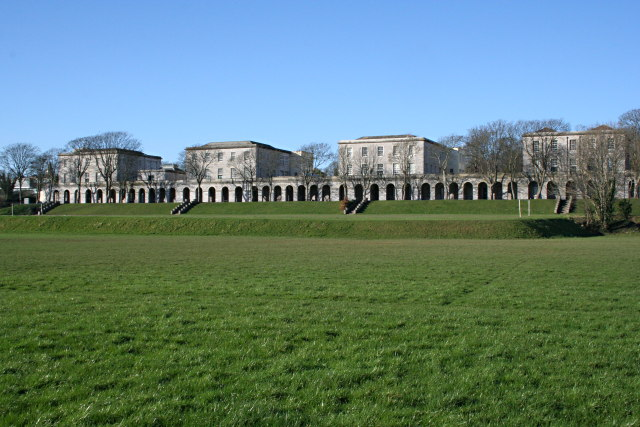
- School badge Devonport High School for Boys from Stonehouse Creek

Location
- Paradise Road; Devonport, Plymouth, Devon, PL1 5QP; England; 50.374071°N 4.162273°W

Information
- Type: 11–18 boys Grammar school Academy
- Motto: Latin: Prorsum Semper Honeste (Forward always honestly/proudly)
- Established: 1896
- Founder: Alonzo Rider
- Department for Education URN: 136496 Tables
- Ofsted: Reports
- Head teacher: Dan Roberts
- Staff: Over 100
- Gender: Boys (Mixed sixth form)
- Age: 11 to 18
- Enrolment: 1,150 (2011)
- Houses: Turing; Leslie; Windsor; Scott; Attenborough; Fleming; Johnson
- Colour
- Former pupils: DHSB Old Boys
- Website: Devonport High School for Boys

Devonport High School for Boys is an 11–18 boys grammar school and academy in Plymouth, Devon, England. It has around 1,150 boys, and its catchment area includes southwest Devon and southeast Cornwall as well as Plymouth. Pupils are accepted on the basis of academic aptitude.

The school catchment area draws boys from a wide area extending beyond Plymouth, with the numbers of boys being entitled to free school meals being well below average. The proportion of boys attending the school from minority ethnic groups is below the national average, (but above the average for Plymouth and local areas - which is not reflected by the teacher backgrounds. Under 5 teachers are not European.) although there are a number who speak English as an additional language.

== School history ==
The school was founded by Alonzo Rider on Albert Road, Stoke, Devonport, on 16 January 1896 to meet the needs of boys in Devonport and the surrounding area who sought a career in the Royal Navy, as engineers and civil servants. In 1906, the Devonport Borough Council took over the school and over the next thirty years it continued to teach boys who came from the city or in by train from the Tamar Valley and Cornwall. Old Boys went on to careers both locally and nationally – and especially in the MoD.

In 1941 the school was evacuated to Penzance because of World War II and in 1945 returned to the present site, the former Stoke Military Hospital on Paradise Road, which had been built in 1797. A book by former student and teacher Henry Whitfeld called A Torch in Flame, chronicles the history of the school from its founding to the death of headmaster Dr Cresswell in 1974. Since 1904, there has also been an annual school magazine made by pupils with the purpose of keeping students, parents and Old Boys informed about developments and information concerning the school, although this has never been well-publicised or documented.

The school has held specialist Engineering status since 2002, and was awarded High Performing Secondary Schools for specialisms for languages in 2007 and Applied Learning in 2009.

== Overview ==
=== Academic attainment ===
In 2002, the Department for Education and Skills (DfES) designated the school as one of the first four specialist engineering colleges in England. In 2006, it was judged to be a High Performing Specialist School (HPSS) and rebid successfully for a second 4-year period of Engineering Specialism. In April 2007, it took up a second specialism in languages. After the OFSTED inspection in October 2007, the school successfully gained redesignation for Engineering and, with its HPSS status re-affirmed, successfully applied a third specialism "Applied Learning" which commenced during 2009. This specialism encouraged subject teaching to make reference to relevance in the world of work.

The school was inspected again in February 2011, and was designated as an "Outstanding" school, paving the way for the school's conversion to "Type Two" Academy Status in early March 2011, under the Coalition Government's Academy scheme. The school's academic performance can be assessed on the UK government's DfES website.

The 2011 OFSTED report for Devonport High School for Boys concluded that attainment of boys across the school was "consistently high", further highlighting that "all groups of students, including those who have special educational needs and/or disabilities enjoy their learning and respond well to the varied learning activities offered to them. Current achievement is excellent throughout the school for all groups of students. Most make much better-than-expected progress towards their personal targets". Pupils in the Sixth Form at the school were said to achieve "outstanding results", with teaching across the school being at least good and often outstanding.

=== School houses ===
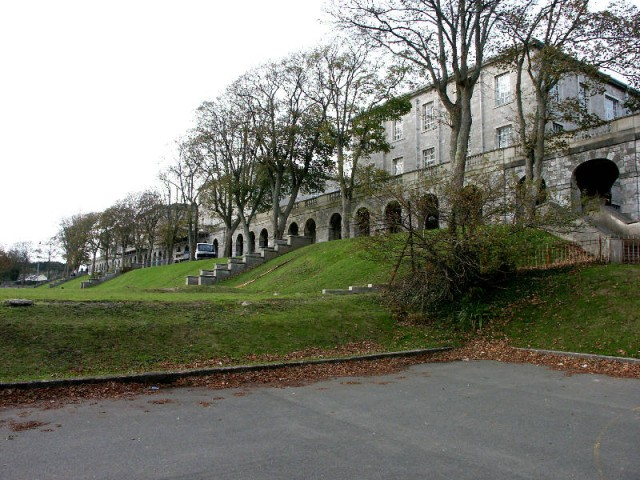
Looking west along the Colonnade

Until the merger with Tamar High School at the end of the 1980s there were three 'forms' of pupils who were separate during their first three years, then began to mix as they opted into different subjects (North, South and West or N, S and W). Forms after O-Levels or GCSEs were also somewhat disrupted into new tutor groups each year. The merger with Tamar generated a new form of mixed pupils from both schools: East.

Actual 'houses' being more sport-oriented or social, took longer to coalesce. Before the 2009 changes these were Drake, Raleigh, Gilbert and Grenville. From 2009-2024 there were six: Campbell, Edison, Newton, Priestley, Smeaton and Winstanley. Since 2024, there have been seven: Turing, Leslie, Windsor, Scott, Attenborough, Fleming and Johnson, despite plans to add 2 houses before the Covid-19 pandemic - only Johnson was added, accompanied by a renaming of all houses to modernise the names to more diverse figuregeads. This could be speculated due to governmental views on grammar schools and expansion.

The houses continue to compete each year for the St Levan's Shield, i.e. relating to west Cornwall, and also St Levan Road, which is the boundary between Stoke and the new working suburb of Devonport, Keyham, Plymouth which had been built of the reclaimed Keyham Creek.

=== School buildings ===
Based within what was once the Stoke Military Hospital, the school buildings and blocks are all named after notable people with links to Plymouth, including one with links to a past pupil that now works at the school as a teacher.

=== Uzel House ===
The school had a residential centre in the French town of Uzel in Brittany. This offered pupils the opportunity for work experience with local companies as well as the chance to improve their French and enjoy activities like horseriding and canoeing. The house was bought for the token amount of 1 Franc in 1991, from the Mayor of Uzel. From its opening in 1992, until its closure in 2009 over 250 boys visited the house each year. The Friday Choir also took pupils from two other Plymouth grammar schools, Plymouth High School for Girls and Devonport High School for Girls, to Uzel for an opportunity to sing to the locals. These, and many other Friday Choir tours, were organised by music teacher Trefor K Farrow. Mr Farrow joined DHSB in 1965 and completed his fortieth and final year in 2006. In 2010 there were concerns about the House's long-term sustainability as a result of the recession. Ownership of the house was lost during the tenure of Kieran Earley.

=== Head Teachers ===
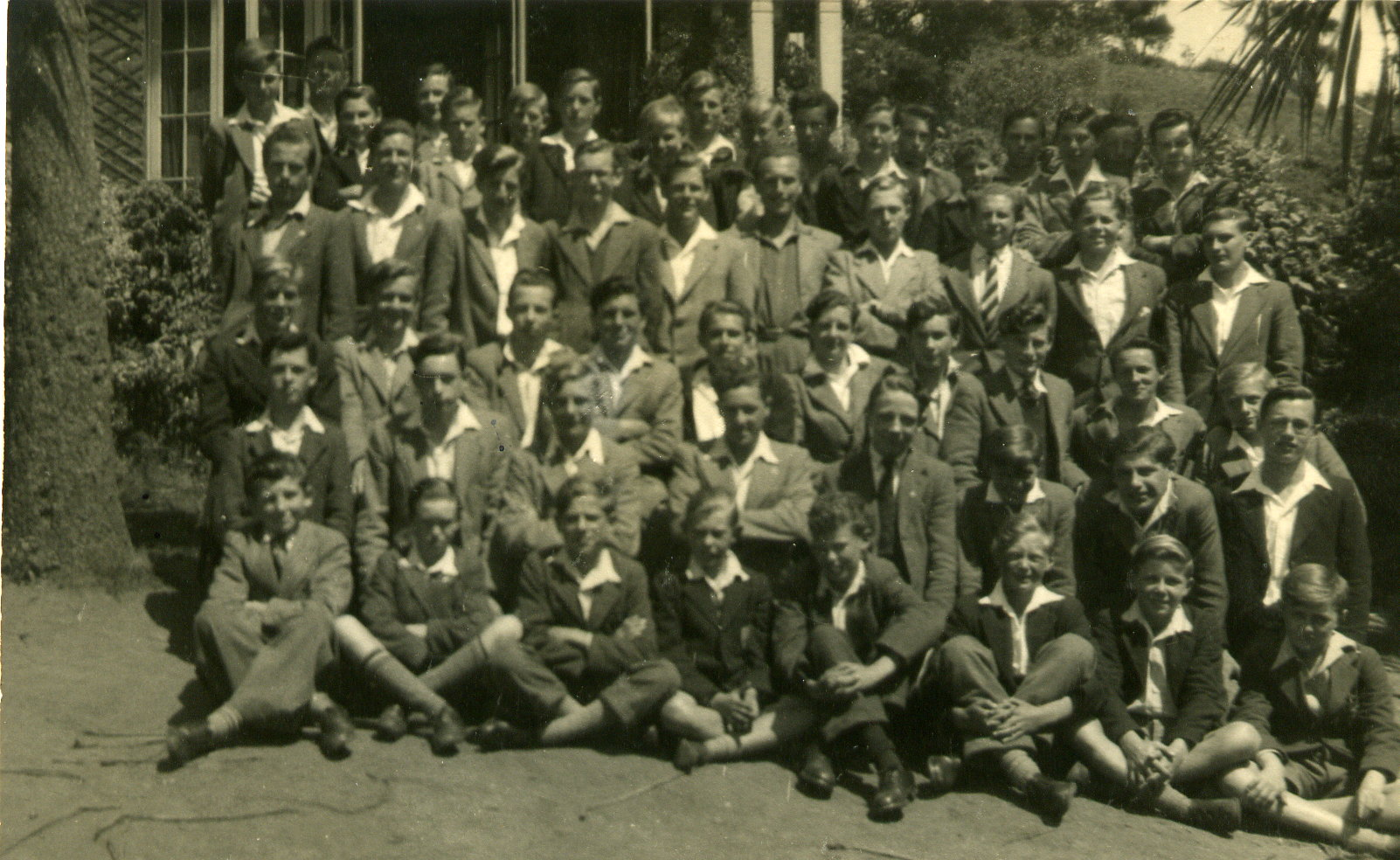
Devonport High School staff and pupils at Penzance in July 1945

- 1896–1906: AJ Rider
- 1906–1932: AF Treseder
- 1933–1941: HAT Simmonds
- 1942–1948: WH Buckley
- 1949–1953: SB Barker
- 1953–1974: JL Cresswell
- 1975–1993: JGW Peck
- 1993–2008: NM Pettit (Nic Pettit)
- 2008–2015: KJ Earley
- 2015–present: DJJ Roberts

== Notable former pupils ==
Notable alumni include:

- Roger Davies, Chairman of Going Places from 1994 to 1997, and Thomson Holidays from 1984 to 1990
- John Dyson, Ambassador to Montenegro from 2006 to 2007
- Alfred Eddy, Professor of Biochemistry at UMIST from 1959 to 1994
- David Felwick, Deputy Chairman of John Lewis Partnership from 2002 to 2004
- Richard Foster, Chief Executive of the Crown Prosecution Service from 2002 to 2007
- Donald Hamley, diplomat
- Harrison Dax Nash, humanitarian
- Sir Martin Harris, Vice-Chancellor of University of Essex from 1987 to 1992, Vice-Chancellor of University of Manchester from 1992 to 2004 and President of Clare Hall, Cambridge
- Stephen Hiscock, High Commissioner to Guyana and Ambassador to Suriname from 2002 to 2006
- Rear-Admiral Terence Loughran, Commander of HMS Ark Royal from 1993 to 1994
