= British military hospital =

Hospitals run by the British military

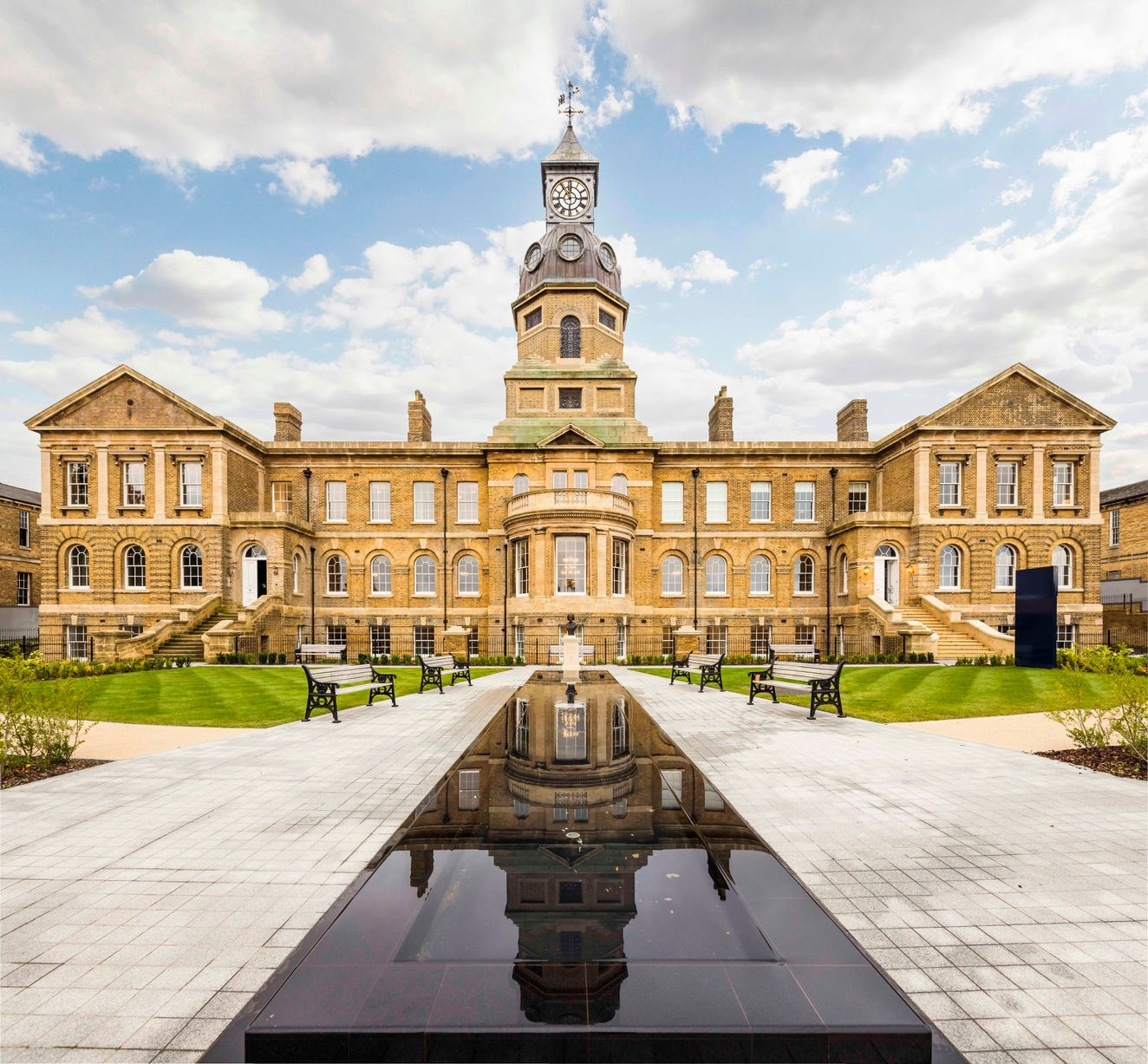
Cambridge Military Hospital in Aldershot was opened in 1878 to serve the expanding garrison.

British Military Hospitals were established and operated by the British Army, both at home and overseas during the 19th and 20th centuries, to treat service personnel (and others in certain circumstances). They varied in size, purpose and permanence.

Until the latter part of the 20th century the term 'Military Hospital' in British usage always signified a hospital run by the Army, whereas those run by the Navy were designated Royal Naval Hospitals and those run by the Royal Air Force RAF Hospitals. In the UK the last of these Military Hospitals were closed in the 1990s, replaced by a single tri-service hospital (which was itself closed in 2007); since then, service personnel (except when deployed on active service) have usually been treated in civilian (NHS) hospitals (some of which have had integrated Ministry of Defence Hospital Units provided as part of their establishment).

== History ==
Prior to 1873, medical services in the British Army were for the most part provided on a regimental basis. Each regiment had its own regimental surgeon, whose duties (from 1796) included provision of suitable equipment, staff and premises for the regimental hospital. The hospital moved with the regiment: when the regiment was in barracks, the barrack hospital block would be used; otherwise another suitable location would have to be found and prepared. Some larger garrisons, with several different corps and regiments based on the same site, had garrison hospitals in which patients would be accommodated together; but individuals would still be treated by the medical staff of their own regiment or unit. In addition, the Board of Ordnance (whose military branch included the Royal Artillery and the Royal Engineers) maintained its own independent medical facilities until 1853.

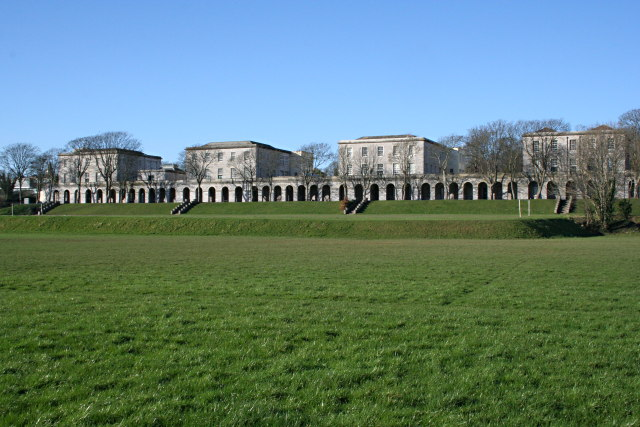
18th-century wards blocks of the former Stoke Military Hospital, Plymouth, linked by a colonnade.

The first example of more integrated facilities being set up in Britain was during the War of American Independence, when (by 1781) three hospitals had been put in place to receive returning wounded servicemen (one in Portsmouth, on in Chatham and one in Carisbrooke on the Isle of Wight); but these were only temporary provisions. A more permanent establishment of General (as opposed to regimental) Hospitals was envisaged by the Army Medical Board (formed in 1793), which opened new purpose-built General Hospitals in Plymouth (1795), Gosport (1796) and Walmer (1797), as well as establishing York Hospital in London (based around the Infirmary of the Royal Hospital, Chelsea) and a new hospital in Chatham. (The latter was intended to serve as the national Army Depôt Hospital for invalids; but when the Invalid Depôt moved away from Chatham to the Isle of Wight, in 1801, the hospital moved with it to Parkhurst.) Other General Hospitals were planned or opened during the French Revolutionary and Napoleonic Wars, but all were short-lived and the concept as a whole was criticised both for high running costs and for high rates of infection and mortality. By the end of the war the only remaining General Hospitals were York Hospital in Chelsea and the Depôt Hospital in Parkhurst. When the Invalid Depôt moved back to Chatham in 1819 a Military Hospital was re-established in Fort Pitt (whereupon the General Hospital at Chelsea was discontinued). From then until after the Crimean War, the Depôt Hospital at Fort Pitt, Chatham was the only General Military Hospital in England; Ireland (which had a separate Medical Department until 1833) had two: one in Dublin and one in Cork.

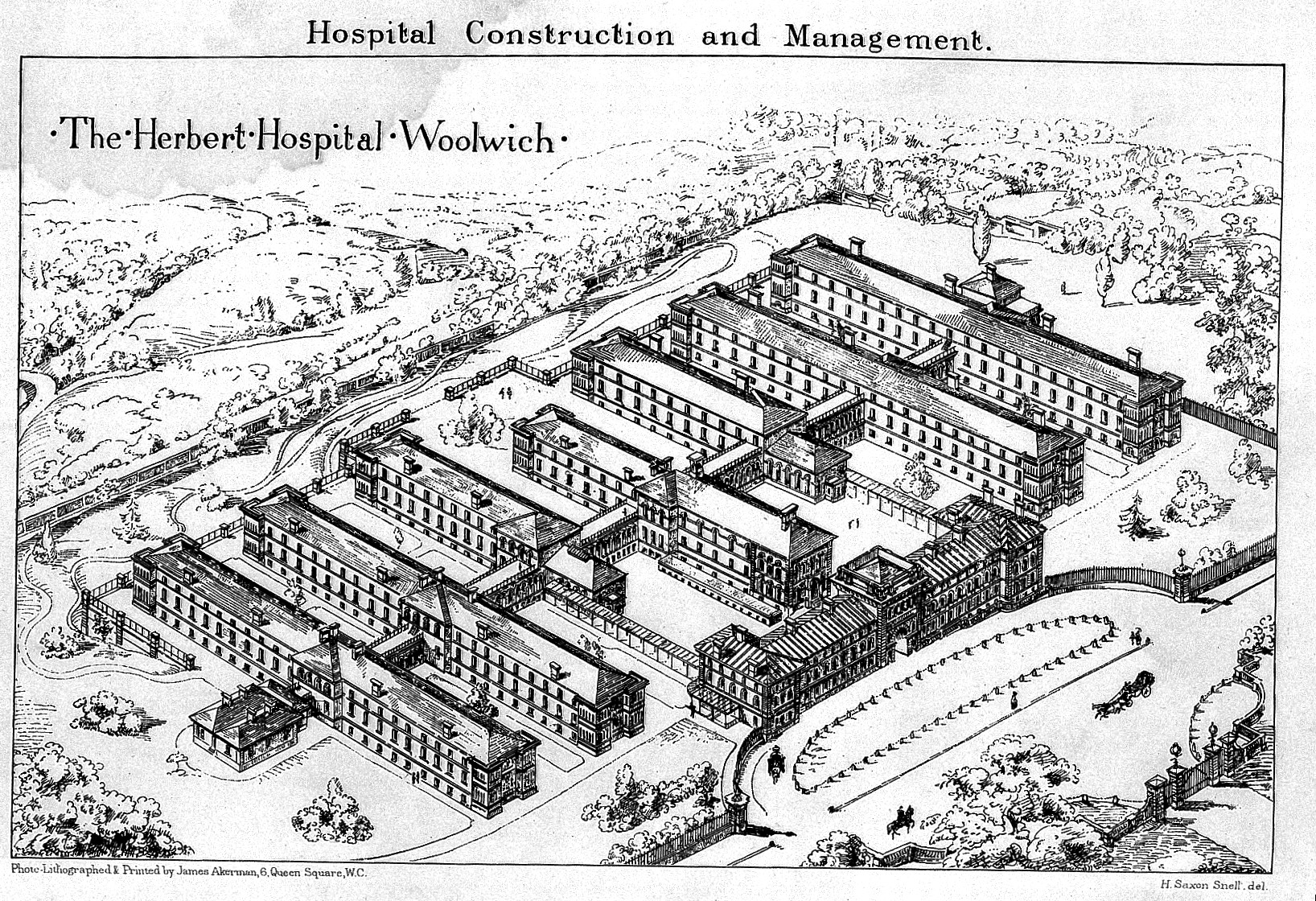
Pavilion layout of the Royal Herbert Hospital, Woolwich.

After Crimea, the recommendations of Florence Nightingale, Douglas Galton, Sidney Herbert, John Sutherland and others led to the formation of a Barracks and Hospitals Commission (1858) and the building of new Army General Hospitals in accordance with the latest design principles for improving health and hygiene. The thousand-bed Royal Victoria Hospital, Netley (1863) was one of the most prominent new military hospitals of this time (albeit its design, finalised before the recommendations were published, was heavily criticised by members of the Commission). The Royal Herbert Hospital, Woolwich (1865) was celebrated as an exemplary 'pavilion plan' hospital. Barrack hospitals were also rebuilt at this time according to the same principles (as happened at Hilsea, Hounslow and elsewhere).

In 1873 the regiment-based provision of medical services was abolished and regimental hospitals ceased to exist. Thenceforward the British Army had three main classes of hospital: General Hospitals ('for the reception of invalids, local sick of corps, and all others entitles or specially authorized to be admitted into military hospitals'), Station Hospitals ('for the reception and treatment of sick from all corps in garrison, including those of the Auxiliary Forces') and Field Hospitals. In some stations separate Family Hospitals were provided in addition, for the wives and children of soldiers. All would be staffed by officers of the Army Medical Department, assisted by the other ranks of the Medical Staff Corps (who would later combine to form the Royal Army Medical Corps in 1898). Hospitals were provided both at home and overseas; and, although they were staffed by army personnel and placed under army discipline and command, they provided a service locally 'for all soldiers, seamen of the Royal Navy, the Royal Marines, and others duly authorized to be admitted therein'. For smaller detachments (of less than a hundred men) hospital provision could be placed under a civilian medical practitioner.

Provision of hospitals in the field of battle, as envisaged in the late 19th century, depended on medical officers being attached to front-line regiments and corps, with regimental bearer companies under their command who would convey the injured personnel back to the hospitals. The Field Hospitals (those closest to the front line) were lightly-equipped to enable them to move forward with the troops; further back were Stationary Hospitals, which were more heavily equipped, located on the lines of communication; and further back still there would be a fully-equipped General Hospital at the base of operations.

Large-scale military hospitals were built in the late Victorian period to serve the expanding garrison towns of Aldershot (the Cambridge Military Hospital, 1875-79 and the Connaught Military Hospital, 1895-98) and Colchester (the Colchester Military Hospital, 1893-98). Hospitals on a similar scale were built in the Edwardian period, in London (Queen Alexandra Military Hospital, Millbank, 1903-5) and Portsmouth (Queen Alexandra Military Hospital, Portsdown Hill, 1904-7); these were the last new general military hospitals to be built on the pavilion plan.

In 1922, as part of a process of rationalisation, the Military Hospitals in Chatham, Cosham and Devonport were closed, with military patients in these districts instead being treated at the nearby naval hospitals (at Gillingham, Haslar and Stonehouse). At the same time the opposite process took place in Gibraltar, where the RN Hospital closed down, and naval personnel were transferred to the local Military Hospital.

Later in the century, during the two world wars several civilian hospitals and county mental asylums were commandeered (or part-commandeered) to serve as military hospitals, as were a number of large houses and other buildings.

In 1993, following on from the Options for Change review at the end of the Cold War, a decision was taken to cut the number of Defence Services hospitals in the UK from seven to three (one for each Service): Haslar for the Navy, Aldershot for the Army and Wroughton for the RAF. The following year, as part of Front Line First, it was announced that the latter two would also close (leaving only Haslar, which would be reconstituted as a tri-service hospital); Aldershot and Wroughton duly closed in 1996. Two years later, as part of the 1998 Strategic Defence Review, it was announced that Haslar too would close; subsequently, provision of a specialised military hospital service would be limited to a number of small MOD units established within (civilian) NHS hospitals.

== List of British Military Hospitals ==
During the 19th and 20th centuries the British Army operated a large variety of permanent and temporary military hospitals, both at home and overseas, some of which are listed here.

=== At home ===
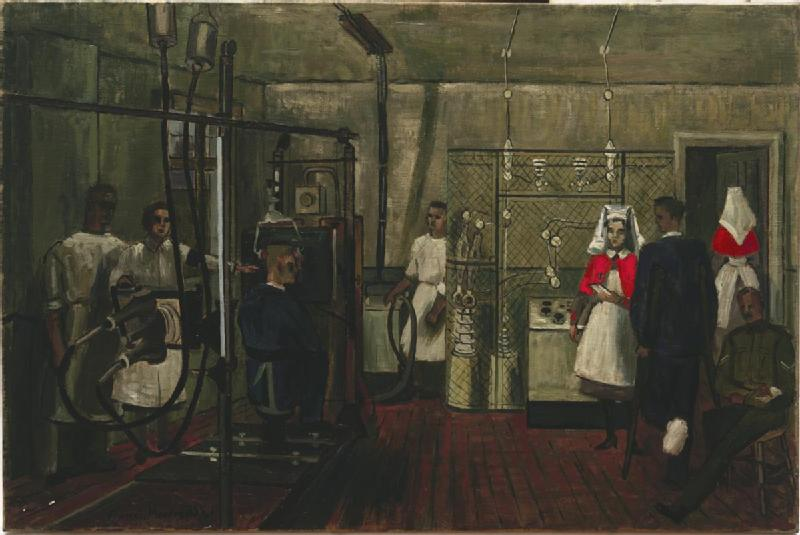
X-ray department at Queen Alexandra Military Hospital, Millbank, 1941 (by Frances Macdonald).

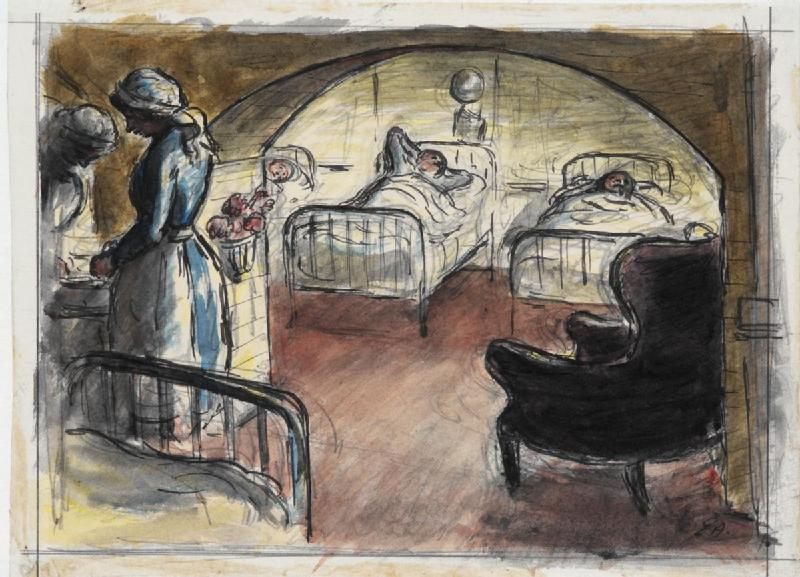
Basement ward in the Royal Herbert Hospital, Woolwich (by Edward Ardizzone)

- Alexandra Royal Military Hospital, Portsdown Hill, Cosham (opened 1908, closed 1926)
- Fort Pitt Military Hospital, Chatham (opened 1819, closed 1922)
- BMH Cowglen Glasgow
- Cambridge Military Hospital, Aldershot (South Camp) (opened 1879, closed 1996)
- Colchester Military Hospital - Colchester Garrison (opened 1898, closed 1977)
- Connaught Military Hospital - Aldershot (North Camp) (opened 1897, closed 1946)
- Duchess of Kent's Military Hospital - Catterick Garrison (opened 1976, closed 1999)
- Duke of Connaught Unit Northern Ireland
- Queen Alexandra Military Hospital, Millbank (opened 1905, closed 1977)
- Queen Elizabeth Military Hospital, Woolwich (opened 1977, closed 1996)
- Musgrave Park Hospital
- Royal Victoria Hospital, Netley (opened 1863, closed 1958)
- Royal Hospital Chelsea
- Royal Herbert Hospital, Woolwich (opened 1865, closed 1977)
- Stoke Military Hospital, Devonport (opened c.1795, closed 1926)
- Tidworth Military Hospital (opened 1907, closed 1977)
- Military Hospital Wheatley - now Wheatley Park School
- Wool Military Hospital - Bovington Camp

=== Overseas ===
Permanent hospital facilities established by the army overseas were often designated 'BMH' (signifying 'British Military Hospital'). The following is an incomplete list:

- BMH Alexandria, Egypt
- Cyprus
  - BMH Dhekelia (opened 1958)
  - BMH Nicosia (closed 1959)
- BMH Dharan, Nepal
- Germany
  - BMH Hanover - closed and mobilized as 32nd Field Hospital to Saudi Arabia during the Gulf War in 1990
  - BMH Rinteln - closed in 1997 and now home to charity organization (Lebenshilfe)
  - BMH Iserlohn - closed 1990s
  - BMH Hamburg - since 1958 the Bundeswehrkrankenhaus Hamburg
  - BMH Hostert - 1950s/60s
  - BMH Münster
  - BMH Wuppertal
  - BMH Berlin (Spandau; relocated to Charlottenburg in 1967; closed in 1994)
- BMH Gibraltar
- BMH Hong Kong
- BMH Kaduna, Nigeria
- BMH Kingston, Jamaica
- BMH Malta
- BMH Nairobi, Kenya
- BMH Shanghai
- BMH Singapore - now Alexandra Hospital - part of National University Health System
