= Fort Pitt Grammar School =

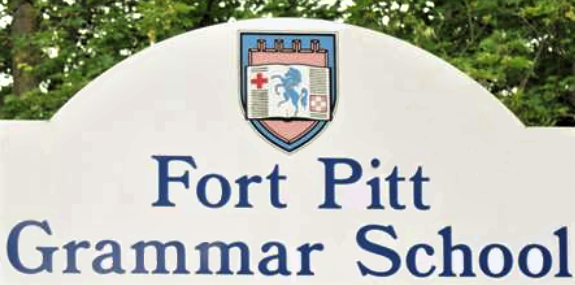
- School sign board showing school badge

Location
- Fort Pitt Hill; Chatham, Kent, ME4 6TJ; England; 51.38043°N 0.5152°E

Information
- Type: Grammar school; Academy
- Trust: Beyond Schools Trust (3123)
- Department for Education URN: 136337 Tables
- Headteacher: Salena Hirons (2023-present)
- Gender: Girls (Year Group 7-11). Mixed gender 6th form.
- Age: 11 to 18
- Enrolment: 903
- Houses: Turing (Purple); Kahlo (Blue); Attenborough (Green); Mandela (Red); Aderin (Yellow); Angelou (Orange)
- Website: http://www.fortpitt.medway.sch.uk

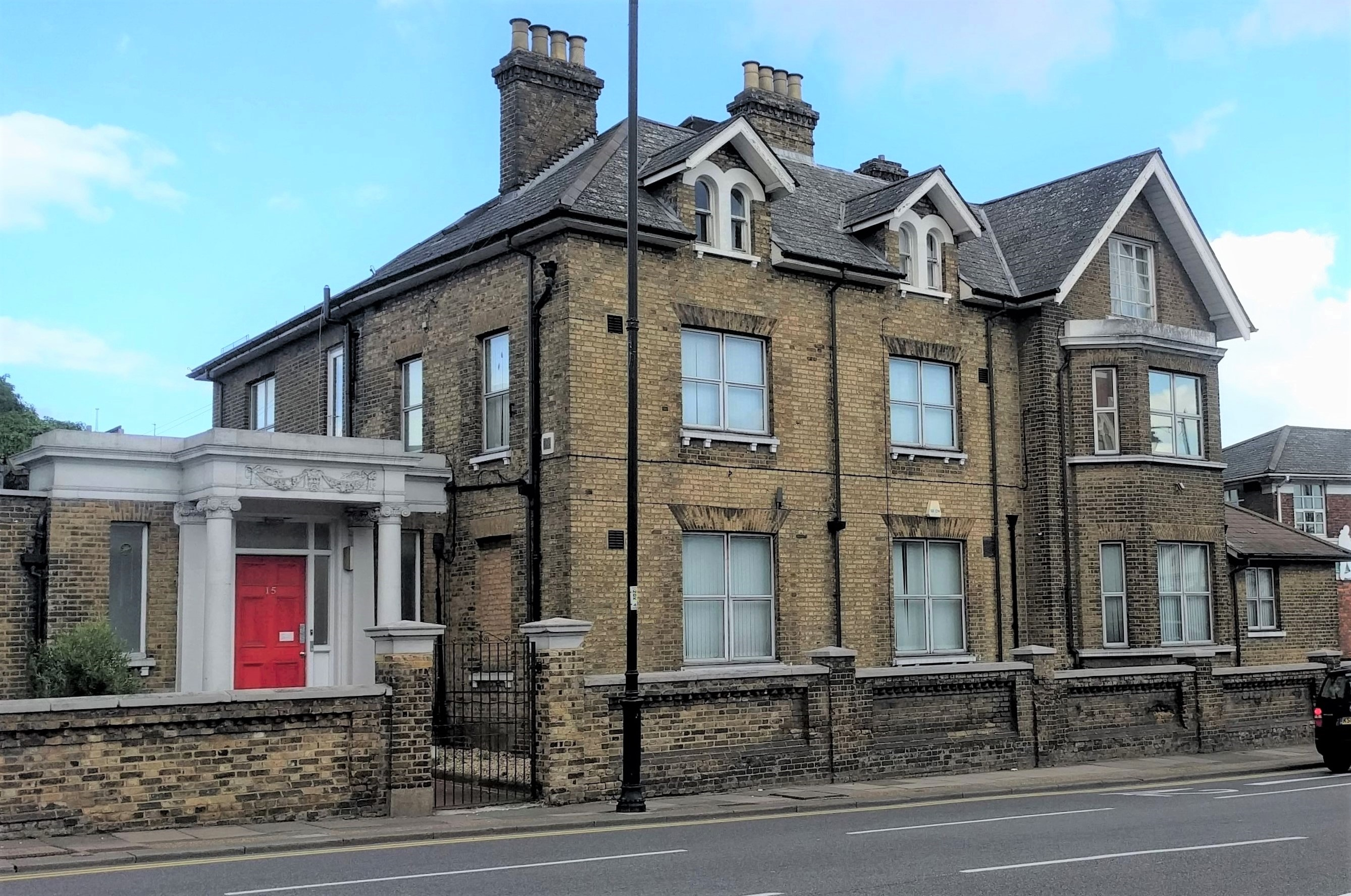
Elm House, Chatham. Main school building 1918–29, when moved to nearby Fort Pitt

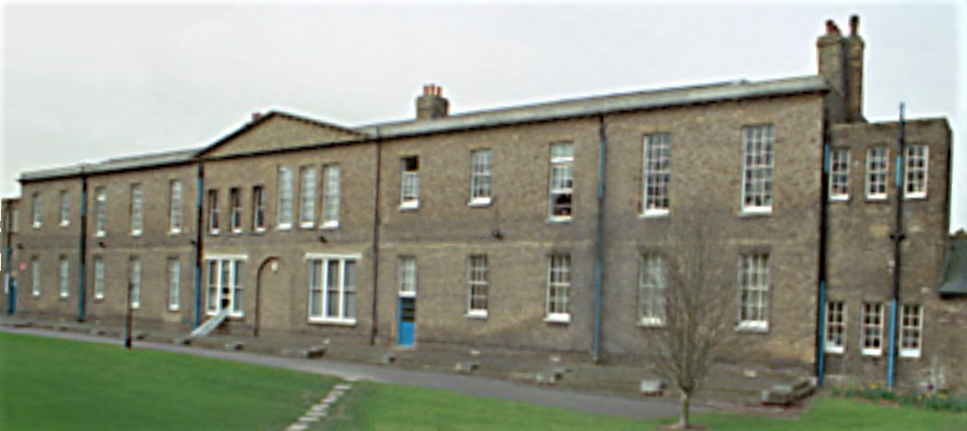
Block built as hospital wards used during the Crimean War, now used as classrooms

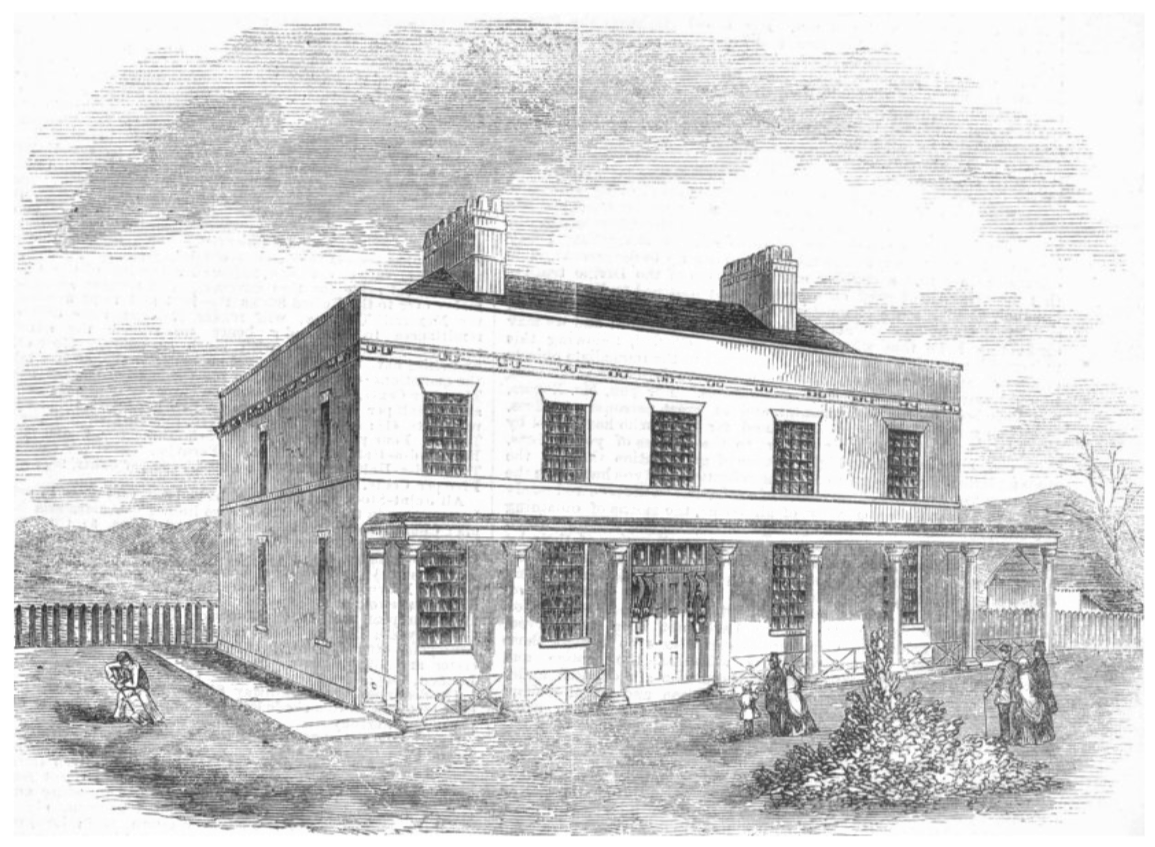
'Asylum for insane soldiers' 1857 in Fort grounds, now school Music House

Fort Pitt Grammar School is a selective girls' grammar school with academy status in Chatham, Kent. Built on Fort Pitt Hill on the site of a Napoleonic era fort, it is situated next to the former Rochester campus of the University for the Creative Arts, which closed in 2023.

== History ==
See Fort Pitt, Kent for the history of the Fort.

The present Fort Pitt site has served as a school since 1929, when the Chatham Technical Day School for Girls moved there. In 1984 it became a girls’ grammar school, a status it holds to this day.

Fort Pitt's history stretches back to the Napoleonic Wars, when a fort was built on the site as part of the defences overlooking the River Medway. Not finally used as a fort, it became a military hospital from 1832. Queen Victoria came to Fort Pitt on three separate occasions in 1855 to visit soldiers wounded in the Crimean War, and in 1860 it was selected by Florence Nightingale as the initial site for the new Army Medical School, before this moved to Netley near Southampton in 1863. Continuing as a garrison hospital, King George V and Queen Mary visited servicemen wounded in the First World War there in October 1914. The hospital finally closed in 1919.

The school began as the Chatham Institute in 1916, to train girls for office work, being based at Elm House, New Road, Chatham from 1918. It became the Junior Commercial School in 1919 and the Commercial and Trades School for Girls in 1923 to reflect a widening curriculum. In 1926 it became the Technical Day School for Girls, the first girls' technical school in the UK.

By 1927 the school, with 270 pupils, had doubled in size since 1919 and accommodation was becoming a problem. In 1929 the Education Board therefore bought Fort Pitt, then empty, from the War Office and the school moved there from Elm House. Here it taught a range of technical and vocational subjects open to girls, including typing and office duties, cooking, needlework and, from 1941, pre-nursing courses. Entrance was by examination, and the courses more advanced than offered by non-selective elementary schools, (and secondary modern schools from 1944).

During the Second World War the school remained at Fort Pitt, although numbers were reduced as many children were evacuated. In 1944 it became the Medway Technical School for Girls. The School Certificate (later the General Certificate of Education) was introduced, until then the preserve of the more academic grammar schools.

In 1973 a fire destroyed part of the school, mobile classrooms being installed until new accommodation was built. 18 year old Michael Ambler of Chatham was jailed for four and a half years, for the deliberate fire on 21 January 1973, which cost £100,000.

In 1984 the school was renamed Fort Pitt Grammar School.

The site and school continue to be of national historical significance. The Music House in the school grounds and the 'Crimea Wing' are listed buildings, with some of the old hospital ward numbers still visible on the Crimea Wing's walls. It houses a small display of period artefacts, which is open to students and members of the public. Many of the original outer fort walls remain, although part of the old hospital building was destroyed in the 1973 fire.

== Selective education ==
Today Fort Pitt is one of six selective schools located in the Medway towns. Accredited by the Prince's Trust Teaching Institute, it is a Leading Edge school, a National Support School, and an Initial Teacher Training institution. In its May 2009 report before Fort Pitt left the control of the Medway Council, Ofsted classed Fort Pitt as ‘outstanding’. It and its trusts have not been inspected since. It took up academy status in November 2010 and subsequently sponsored two schools as the Fort Pitt Grammar School Academy Trust. In September 2015 the Trust merged with The Thomas Aveling School to form FPTA Academies (Fort Pitt Thomas Aveling Academies). In 2016 the School was nominated as a Champion School for the National Citizen Service programme.

== School community ==
The school community is divided into learning groups within each year. All students are also a member of one of the six 'houses')comprising students from Years 7-13. The school is five form entry in Years 7-11, with a co-educational sixth form with a capacity of 240 students. The school offers an accelerated curriculum in a 3-year Key Stage 3 (Years 7,8 & 9) and an extended curriculum in 2 year Key Stage 4 (Years 10-11). This complies with the requirements of the National Curriculum. In Key Stage 4, students complete English Baccalaureate subjects.

== Notable alumni ==
=== Fort Pitt Grammar School ===
- Naushabah Khan, Labour politician and Member of Parliament for Gillingham and Rainham.

=== Medway Technical School for Girls ===
- Julie Keeble, competitive ice dancer.
- Zandra Rhodes, fashion designer.
