= Gordon Burton =

Caribbean politician

Gordon Burton MP

Speaker of the House of Assembly
- Incumbent
- Assumed office 4 March 2021
- Preceded by: Dwayne Taylor

Personal details
- Party: Progressive National Party

Gordon Burton is a Turks and Caicos Islander politician who has been speaker of the House of Assembly since 4 March 2021. He is a member of the Progressive National Party.
