= David Felwick =

British businessman

David Felwick CBE
- Born: 9 November 1944 (age 81); Plymouth
- Occupations: Businessman, Investor
- Known for: Waitrose; John Lewis Partnership; Plymouth Argyle F.C.
- Spouse: Lynne Margaret (m. 1970)
- Children: 2

David Leonard Felwick CBE (born 9 November 1944) is a British businessman who was most notably the managing director of Waitrose from 1991 to 2002, and the Deputy Chairman of the John Lewis Partnership between 2002 and 2004.

== Early life and education ==
Felwick was born on 9 November 1944, the son of Leonard Felwick and Mary J. Felwick (née Rolling). After completing his secondary education at Devonport High School for Boys, Plymouth, he trained at the Royal Air Force College Cranwell. He served with the Royal Air Force for twenty years, from 1962 to 1982, reaching the rank of Wing Commander.

== Career ==
In 1982, Felwick began his business career with the John Lewis Partnership. Between 1985 and 1987, he was the managing director of the John Lewis store in Welwyn, before becoming the Director of Selling of Waitrose. In 1991, he was promoted to the positions of managing director of Waitrose and Director of Trading (Food) for John Lewus. He remained in these posts until 2002, when he was succeeded by Steven Esom and Mark Price respectively. Under his Directorship, Waitrose's turnover had doubled and the number of stores increased by 46. From 11 March 2002, he then served as the Deputy Chairman of the John Lewis Partnership for two years. During this time, he was also the Chairman of the British Retail Consortium.

In the 2004 New Years Honours list Felwick was appointed a Commander of the Order of the British Empire for his services to retailing.

In January 2012, Felwick joined the board of directors at his home-town club Plymouth Argyle Football Club. Felwick left the club in a board reshuffle ahead of the 2017-18 season, and was set to re-join the club in October 2018 as club chairman, but was unable to take over, citing "personal reasons".

== Honours and awards ==
2004 (January) - appointed a Commander (CBE) of the Order of the British Empire

== Personal life ==
Felwick lives in Wallingford with his wife Lynne Margaret (née Yeardley), whom he married in 1970. They have two sons.

He enjoys skiing and playing tennis and golf.
