= Stoke Military Hospital =

Former military hospital in Plymouth, England

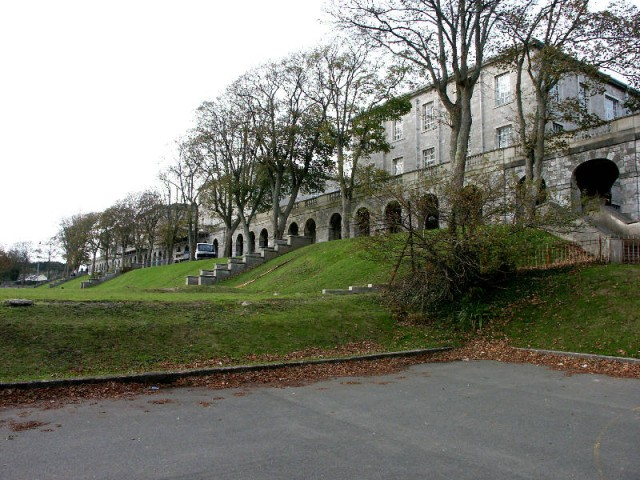
- South prospect of the former Stoke Military Hospital

Location
- Location within Devon
- Coordinates: 50.373°N 4.162°W

Site history
- Built: 1797
- Built for: War Office
- In use: 1797-1945

Stoke Military Hospital was an army medical facility in Plymouth, England.

== History ==
The facility, which was sited on the north side of Stonehouse Creek, was designed for use by the British Army and styled to match the Royal Naval Hospital on the south side of the creek. It was built using Napoleonic prisoners of war, who were housed in prison ships on the Hamoaze, and was completed in 1797. It was used extensively during the Crimean War and the Second Boer War and then again in the First World War and Second World War. The Grade II listed building consists of four 3 storey square ward blocks made of limestone plus an administration building. The ward blocks are laid out in a line, joined by an arched colonnade, which is 166.18 metres (545.2 ft) long, with a balcony facing what is now the school playing fields. Stonehouse creek originally allowed ships to disembark patients directly to the hospital but was filled in during the 1960s.

At the end of the Second World War, the hospital was decommissioned and Tamar High School and Devonport High School for Boys, which had both returned from wartime evacuation, moved into the former military hospital. Each school occupied two of the four main blocks of the original hospital, Devonport High School the easternmost blocks plus the administration building. After Tamar High School closed in 1989, Devonport High School for Boys, expanded to occupy the whole site.

== See also ==
- List of hospitals in England
