= Fort Pitt, Kent =

Napoleonic fort in Chatham, Kent

Coordinates: 51°22′51.66″N 0°30′50.63″E

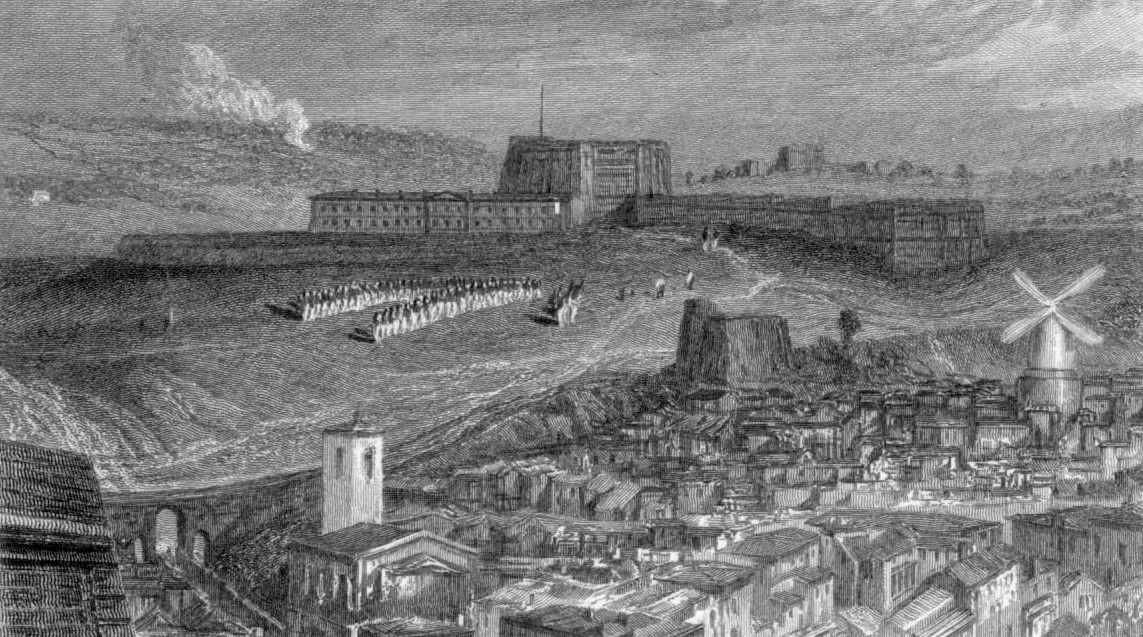
Fort Pitt from Fort Amherst, 1838. The tower (centre) and blockhouse (right) are now demolished, but the hospital building (left) is extant.

Fort Pitt is a Napoleonic era fort on the high ground of the boundary between Chatham and Rochester, Kent.

A fortification on the site was proposed as early as October 1779 by Hugh Debbieg, then Chief Engineer at Chatham. During April 1783 the land was purchased by the Board of Ordnance and 4.5 million bricks were deposited there in preparation for construction of Fort Pitt. (Nothing immediately followed, however, and the bricks were instead used for the rebuilding of the Lines).

Fort Pitt was finally built between June 1805 and April 1819. At that point, the Napoleonic Wars having ended, it ceased being manned as a defensive installation and instead became an important military hospital. From March 1824 to February 1857 it was the only General Military Hospital, as opposed to Regimental Military Hospital, in England, and, until the opening of Netley Hospital in 1863, it was considered the de facto Headquarters of the Army Medical Department. Fort Pitt Hospital closed in the 1920s, since then the surviving buildings have housed a girls' grammar school.

== History ==
=== The original hospital ===
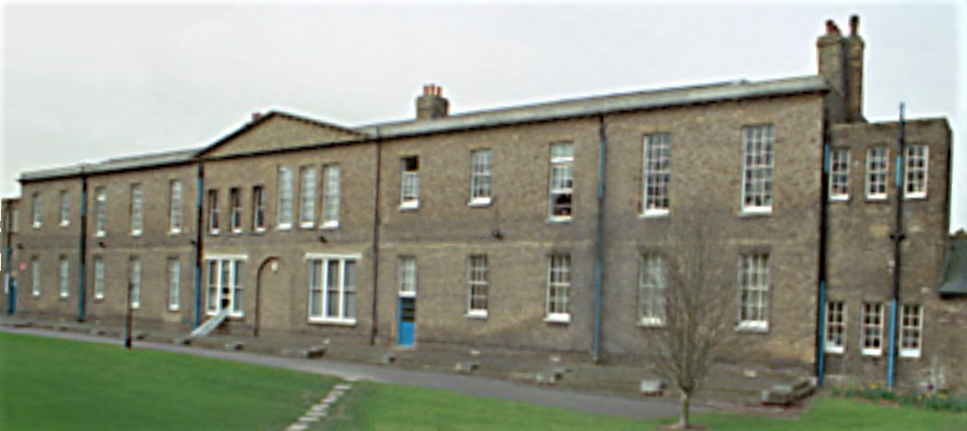
Former hospital block, dating from the late-18th/early-19th century.

In February 1793 Chatham was one of five sites selected by the new Army Medical Board for the establishment of a General Hospital; (as opposed to Regimental Hospital). Towards the end of the century an establishment of medical personnel was appointed and work was begun on the medical building. The intention had been that the General Hospital would function as part of the 'Depôt of Recruits and Invalids' which had been established at Chatham during October 1772. In June 1801, however, the Depôt of Recruits and Invalids was removed to Parkhurst on the Isle of Wight in Hampshire (to be closer to Spithead, the usual embarkation point for troops serving overseas). The established Depôt Hospital went with it; so when the medical building was finally completed by December 1801, it found itself without a function. Two years later, at the start of the Napoleonic Wars, the hospital was finally opened in an attempt to re-establish a General Hospital for the British Army at Chatham; but it did not prove successful (a later report by the Commissioners of Military Enquiry described the General Hospital at that time as being fully equipped with an establishment of 'Officers, Stewards, Nurses, &c.', but 'without a single patient'). Over the next year or so, the General Hospital was gradually run down and it closed in April 1805; later that same year the building was turned over to barrack accommodation, and Fort Pitt was constructed around it.

=== The Fort ===
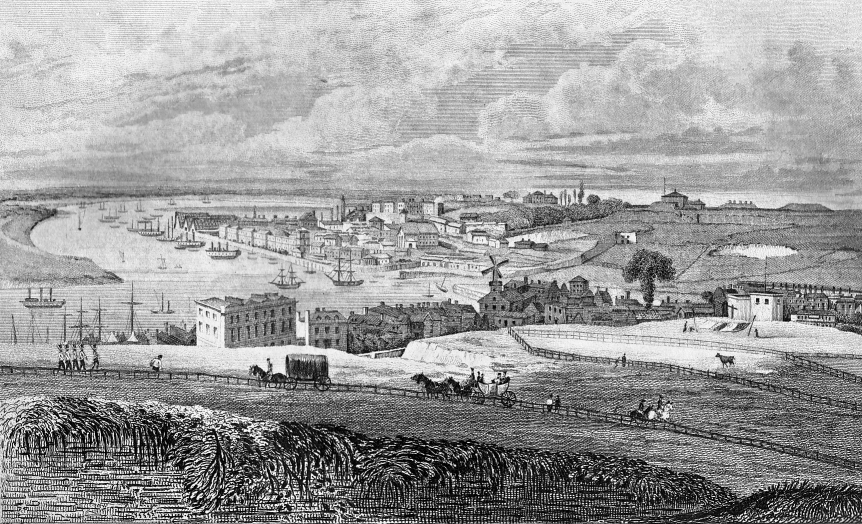
View from Fort Pitt to the north, 1831 (with Chatham in the foreground, and the dockyard (left) and Fort Amherst (right) in the distance).

Construction of Fort Pitt on the site began during June 1806, in response to renewed fears of a French invasion. Named after Prime Minister William Pitt (who had died on 23 January 1806), Fort Pitt was planned as part of the defensives overlooking the River Medway: Fort Clarence, Fort Amherst and the Great Lines were visible from Fort Pitt, the whole providing a defensive ring to protect Chatham Dockyard from landward attack. A further concern (with the potential of invasion in mind) was to guard the approaches to Rochester Bridge, which was a key riverine crossing on the most direct route from the south-east coast to London.

By April 1813 the construction of Fort Pitt was more or less complete (although some works remained to be done). It has been described as a 'remarkable hybrid': it was among the very last bastioned forts to be built in the United Kingdom (as the style was by then obsolescent), but integrated into its form were multi-storey brick gun towers, representing the latest style in fortification.

==== Description ====
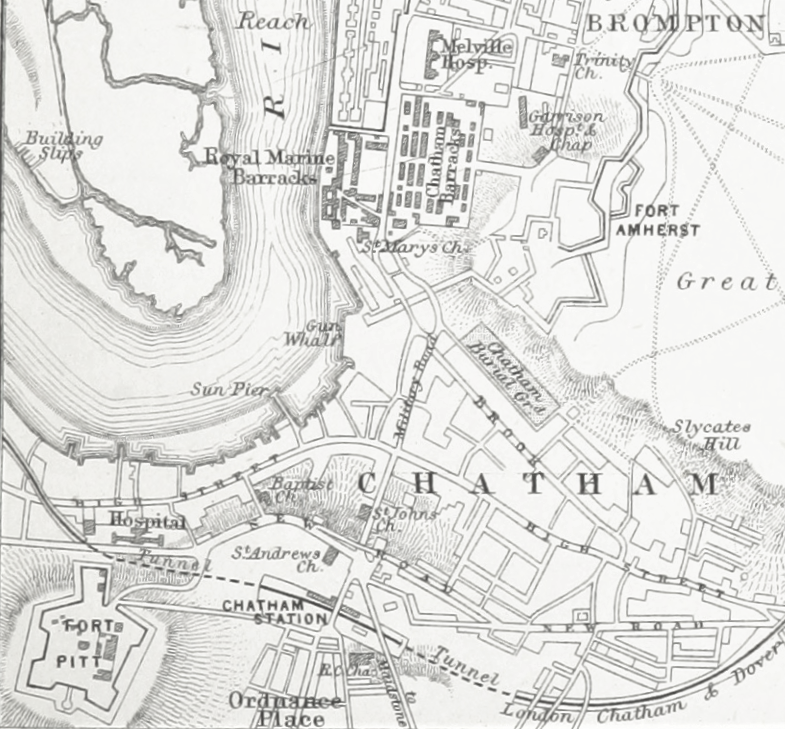
Map of Chatham (1890), showing Fort Pitt (bottom left).

Fort Pitt was laid out as an irregular polygon with a bastion at each corner. Formed of a combination of red-brick walls and earthworks, Fort Pitt was surrounded by a 15 feet (4.6 m) deep defensive trench, beyond which was a substantial glacis. A ravelin was built across the ditch to the south (and connected to Fort Pitt by a caponier); within the walls at this point were a pair of cavaliers (raised gun platforms). Placed off-centre in the middle of Fort Pitt was a substantial tower or keep (akin to the surviving tower at nearby Fort Clarence): three storeys high with a gun platform on its flat roof. In line with the tower to the north, projecting out from Fort Pitt like a hornwork, was a detached blockhouse containing casemated barracks with accommodation for up to 500 soldiers. This also functioned as a multi-tiered gun platform, and had a flat roof for gun emplacements. The blockhouse was outside Fort Pitt but attached to it, so as to allow the occupants to withdraw into the building in the event of an attack; it was built on a massive scale, cut into the hillside and flanked by dry moats revetted with bricks. It dominated views of Fort Pitt from Chatham and the north.

Two outlying towers were also built, one on each flank, named 'Delce' and 'Gibraltar'; 'Delce' was linked to the fort by a covered way. Each were brick towers, two storeys high with magazines and stores at basement level. Built with musketry loopholes and equipped (in the case of Delce) with a pair of 18-pound carronades, they were designed to control road access to the bridge: Delce to the west defended the approach from the south, Gibraltar to the east defended the approach from Chatham.

==== Armament ====
Until March 1826 Fort Pitt was armed with ten 18-pound cannons, twenty-two 18-pound carronades and four 10-pound mortars.

Its function was described in 1822 as follows:

'Fort Pitt, scarped with masonry and bastioned [...] is the largest of all the works which cover Chatham, and the nearest to the citadel, the fire of which crosses its own. On the opposite quarter, the fire of Fort Pitt crosses that of Fort Clarence [...] The flanks of Fort Pitt are provided with carronades in frames turning upon pivots to sweep the different parts of the ditch. The gorge of the fort presents a front of fortification, casemated with embrasures, to command in reverse the town of Chatham, and the course of the Medway'.

According to the same description the central tower of Fort Pitt was described as being

'armed at the summit with two long guns to batter in front, and two carronades to protect the gorge. This was at the epoch when the rage for building martello towers had seized the British government [...] The tower in Fort Pitt is very lofty, and its object is to command at a considerable distance the brow of a hill which raises itself with an insensible slope in front of Fort Pitt'.

=== Invalid Depôt and General Military Hospital ===
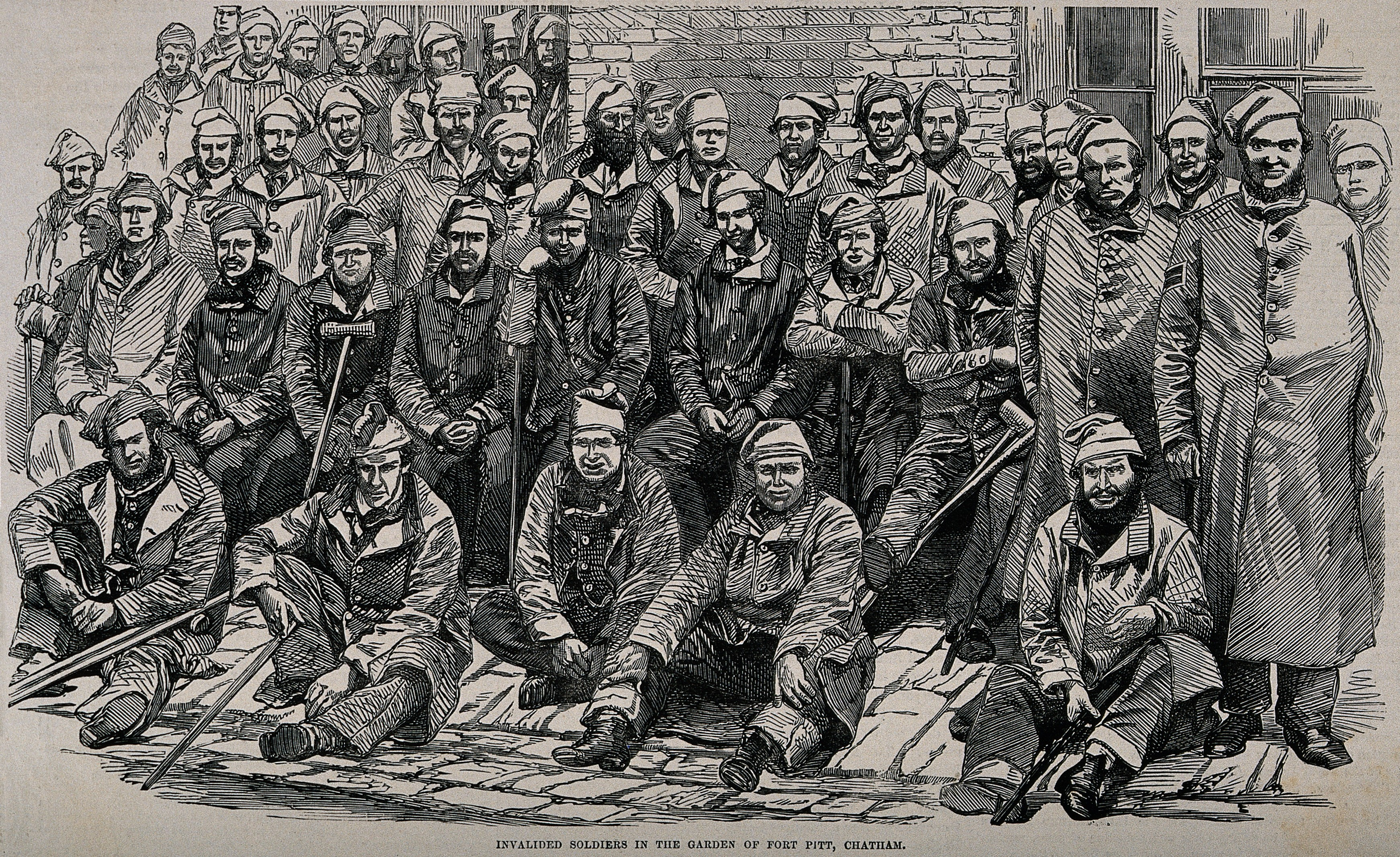
Invalided soldiers in the Fort Pitt Hospital garden, c 1855

The end of the Napoleonic Wars meant that the site was not finally used as a defensive installation, and by September 1814 the soldiers garrisoning Fort Pitt were redeployed. For a brief time it was occupied by the Royal Marine Artillery, due to shortage of accommodation elsewhere, but in April 1815 they were removed to make way for wounded from the Battle of Waterloo.

By December 1819 the Invalid Depôt of British Army was moved back from the Isle of Wight to Chatham, and Fort Pitt was repurposed as a medical establishment to treat soldiers prior to their release from military service. At the same time, the nearby Fort Clarence was converted into a lunatic asylum for personnel from the British Army and Royal Navy.

In the same year, York Hospital, Chelsea (the Army's last remaining General Hospital) was closed to serving soldiers, and Fort Pitt began to be established as Britain's principal military hospital. In 1822 the casemates were said to be 'at present inhabited by invalids, who compose the only garrison of this fortress'.

The building was expanded from October 1823 to March 1824, with eight large wards of twenty-seven beds each providing room for over 200 patients. The H-Plan Hospital building was flanked by smaller blocks to the north and to the south, which served as the quarters for the Medical Officers.

Fort Pitt also functioned as the Medical Staff Depôt: 'all candidates for commissions, and young Medical Officers who had just received commissions, were in the first instance sent down to Fort Pitt; partly in order that, when the exigences of the Public Service Permitted, they might receive a certain amount of training in the special work as Army Surgeons, and partly also because the Staff Depôt formed a convenient place of residence for them until they could be drafted to their respective destinations'. In 1816 the Director General of the Army Medical Department, James McGrigor, had brought from Chelsea a collection of anatomical specimens and other items of interest with a view to establishing a Museum of Military Medicine at Fort Pitt. At the same time he endowed a library on the site, and issued instructions to the Medical Officers of the British Army stationed around the globe to send six-monthly reports of prevalent diseases, treatments and various treatments which were collated at Fort Pitt and made available for analysis and study. The Museum of the Army Medical Department and Library of the Army Medical Department expanded prodigiously over the years and Fort Pitt became an important centre for the study of military and tropical medicine. (By 1851 the library had amassed a collection of 67,000 volumes, and the museum contained 41,000 specimens and numerous anatomical drawings.)

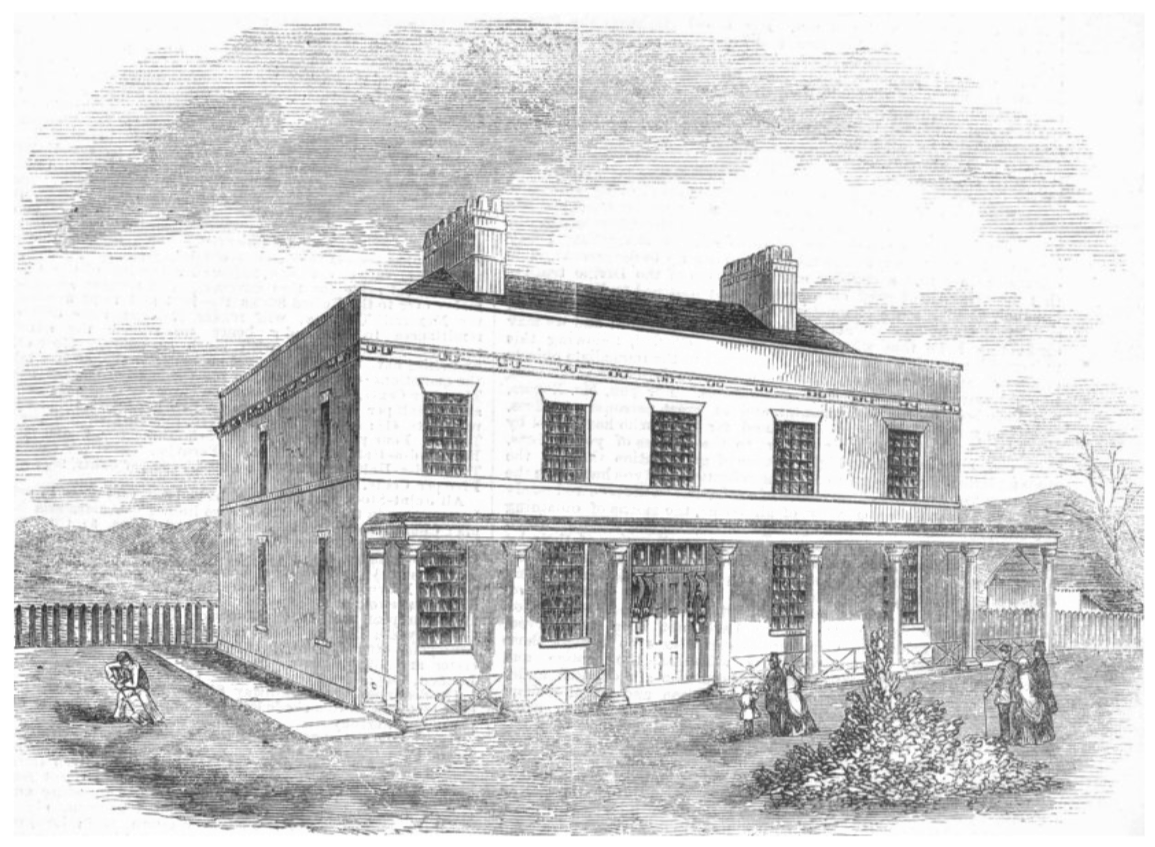
'Asylum For Insane Soldiers’, Fort Pitt. Illustrated London News, 1857.

In 1846 the lunatic asylum for the British Army was moved out of Fort Clarence (and away from Chatham, to the vacant Naval Hospital complex in Great Yarmouth); the following year a smaller "asylum for insane soldiers" was opened in the north-west corner of Fort Pitt, in a former barrack block, (albeit as a place of 'observation and temporary probation' rather than one of ongoing care and treatment).

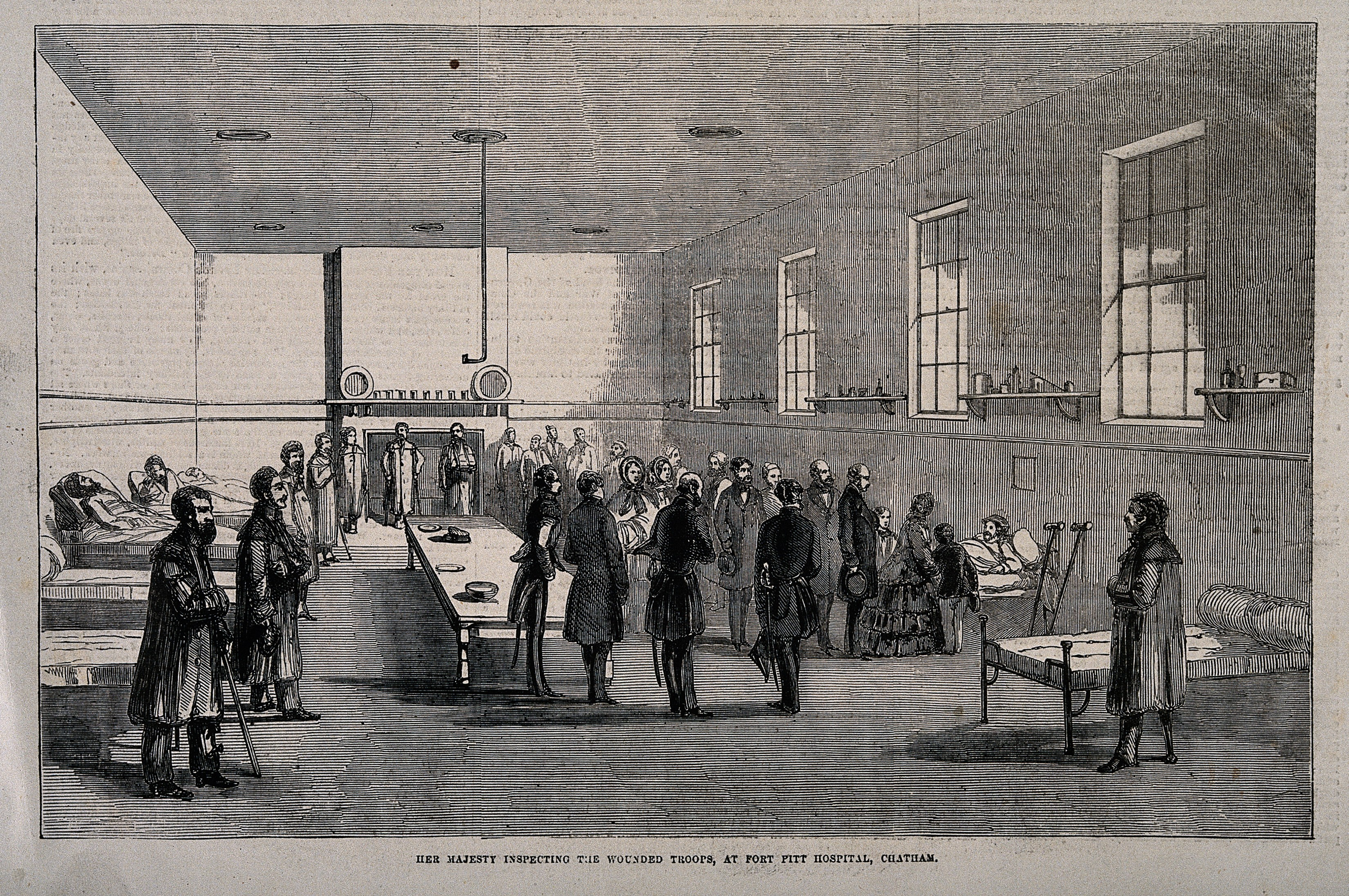
Queen Victoria visiting Invalided Soldiers at Fort Pitt Hospital, 1855.

From March 1854 and onward Fort Pitt had become an important General Military Hospital, with most of the soldiers invalided to Britain from abroad assessed there prior to their discharge. This included most of the sick and wounded from the Crimean War and the Indian Mutiny (Queen Victoria came to Fort Pitt on 3 March 1855 and the 16 April 1856 to visit soldiers wounded in the Crimea.) Florence Nightingale described, at that time, the process whereby 'When a ship arrives with invalids, the bedridden are carried to Fort Pitt, and the convalescents are marched to St Mary's Casemates'. (Those at Fort Pitt were under 'hospital discipline', whereas those at St Mary's were under 'a kind of regimental discipline under the adjutant'.) During the period of the Crimean War a total of 14,700 soldiers passed through the Central Invalid Depôt of the British Army at Chatham.

At some stage the blockhouse at Fort Pitt had been converted into a 'Casemate Hospital' with five casemated wards. During November 1842 to June 1859 two of the casemates were appropriated for the sick women and children of the garrison, for whom it was the only healthcare site provision available; in the year ending March 1857, 26 sick women (and 7 infectious), 12 sick children (and 31 infectious) and 20 lying-in women were treated there. In 1854 psychiatric patients were returned to Fort Pitt from Yarmouth (the General Hospital there having been requisitioned by the Royal Navy) and housed temporarily 'in the "Pit" or Casemates', a place described as being 'most unfit': 'even the temporary confinement of a lunatic, in a place so destitute of the means of ameliorating his mental condition, must materially lessen the chance of his recovery'.

In January 1860 Fort Pitt was selected by Florence Nightingale as the initial site for the new Army Medical School; however, this was only a temporary measure pending the imminent opening of a new General Military Hospital at Netley, near Southampton, which took place in 1863. Along with the Army Medical School, the museum and library were moved to Netley in 1863 and the following year the Invalid Depôt was removed from Chatham to Netley, prompting a reassessment of the function and use of Fort Pitt.

=== Garrison Hospital ===
The Army Sanitary Commissioners had in February 1863 approved a proposal for the facilities at Fort Pitt to be converted into 'a Hospital for the whole of the troops of the garrison, including the Royal Artillery, the Royal Engineers, and the three depots battalions of infantry'. The following year additional buildings were erected 'for the reception of the whole of the troops of the garrison requiring hospital treatment'; at the same time, the old separate Garrison Hospital within the lines at Brompton was closed and its premises converted into barracks.

A major expansion of the General Military Hospital at Fort Pitt was begun in September 1910, necessitating the demolition of the West Wings of the old H-Plan Hospital and also the removal of the Napoleonic-era tower-keep, to make way for a new central medical block (which was linked to the old H-Plan Hospital on one side, and a new West Wing on the other). This Pavilion-Plan Hospital extension (which contained two new operating theatres, an X-Ray Department and other modern facilities) opened just before the outbreak of World War 1 in 1914.

In October 1914 King George V and Queen Mary visited, meeting Servicemen wounded in the First World War, including five German Naval Officers held in a separate ward. At least seventy German prisoners were treated at Fort Pitt. On recovery, they were held in the Blockhouse until the end of the World War 2.

The General Military Hospital closed in August 1922; its patients were transferred to the Royal Naval Hospital, Chatham.

=== Grammar School ===
In September 1929 the Chatham Education Board bought the vacant Fort Pitt from the War Office, and the site was converted into a Girls' Technical School. The school, now known as Fort Pitt Grammar School, remains on the site and has added a number of new buildings. The neighbouring University for the Creative Arts building occupies the old blockhouse site and some of the original brickwork remains visible at the sides of the building.

== Present day ==
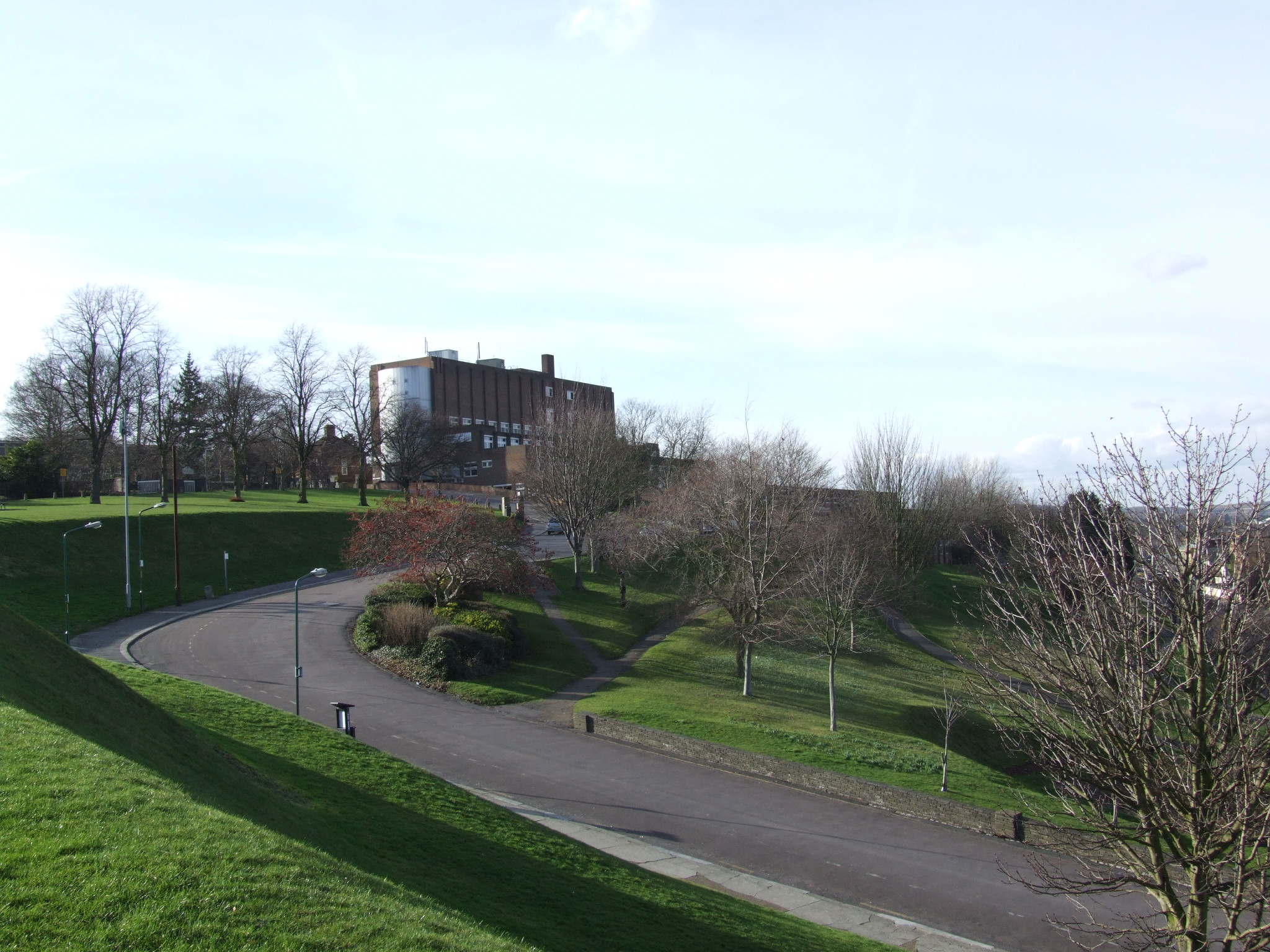
Fort Pitt in 2008 showing University for Creative Arts building on the site of the blockhouse.

The site of Fort Pitt continues to be of historical significance for the United Kingdom and substantial sections of the ramparts are still clearly discernible. Several original buildings of Fort Pitt have not survived above ground level: Gibraltar Tower was demolished in October 1879 and Delce Tower, by then a ruin, was demolished in January 1880. The Central Tower, or Keep, was removed in April 1910 when the General Military Hospital was extended; and the blockhouse was demolished in November 1932, to allow the school to expand (the Rochester campus of the University for the Creative Arts now stands on its site). Nevertheless, much of the outer walls of Fort Pitt survive including parts of the outer defences which extend into the adjacent recreation grounds to the east and west. The tunnels of the fort also survive, but are partly filled in. The remnant blockhouse of Fort Pitt was built over when the Medway College of Design was constructed by August 1970. It became the Kent Institute of Art & Design (KIAD) in September 1987 and a campus for the University for the Creative Arts in September 2005. it is believed that the basement of the Medway College of Design is haunted. Sounds have been heard coming from the brick-lined tunnels of Fort Pitt that were discovered there, since the Medway College of Design opened in September 1970.

Furthermore, several buildings of the Fort Pitt Hospital remain in place as part of the Fort Pitt Grammar School. The Music House (the former 'insane asylum') in the school grounds and the “Crimea Wing” teaching block (the original Napoleonic-era hospital) are both listed buildings, with some of the ward numbers of Fort Pitt Hospital still visible on the Crimea Wing's walls. Several other buildings also date to the period of use as a General Military Hospital, including the North Block (which was first erected as a temporary building to house the Army Medical School in 1860) and the West Wing of the 1914 extension (its main central block having been destroyed in a fire in August 1973).

== Military cemetery ==
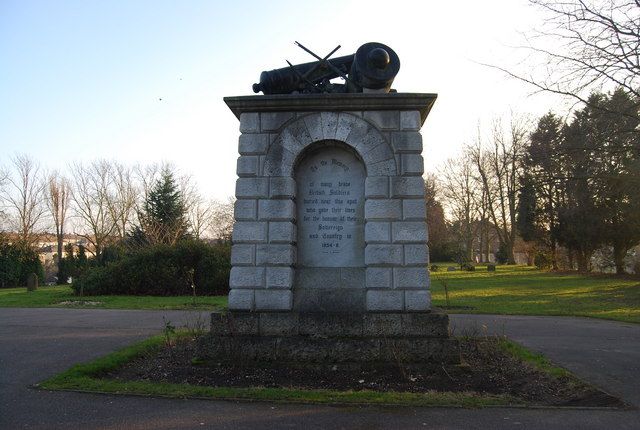
The Crimean War Memorial at Fort Pitt Military Cemetery, "To the memory of many brave British Soldiers buried near this spot who gave their lives for the honour of their Sovereign and Country in 1854-8"

The Fort Pitt Military Cemetery, created initially to serve the hospital, lies a quarter of a mile to the south of Fort Pitt by the A229 road from Rochester to Maidstone. The graves, dating from 1852 to 1853 and onwards, include 290 of Commonwealth service personnel from the World Wars, 265 from World War 1, who lie in an extensive plot, and 25 from World War 2 who are mainly buried in a group north of that plot.

== In literature ==
As a boy, Charles Dickens lived at 2 Ordnance Terrace, a quarter of a mile to the east of Fort Pitt, and the building is the location of the fictional duel between Mr. Nathaniel Winkle and Dr. Slammer in his novel The Posthumous Papers of the Pickwick Club.
