= Merja Kuusisto =

Finnish politician

Merja Kuusisto (born 4 December 1954 in Hausjärvi) is a Finnish politician. From 2007 to 2015 she was a member of the Parliament of Finland from the Uuismaa constituency. She lives in Tuusula and is a qualified specialist nurse. She and her husband, Päivön, have two daughters. Prior to her election to Parliament, Kuusisto was Chairwoman of the Tuusula municipal council, to which she was first elected in 1985, from 2001 to 2006. Kuusisto is a member of the Social Democratic Party of Finland.
