= Kew, Turks and Caicos Islands =

Village in Turks and Caicos Islands, United Kingdom

Kew
- Village
- Location within Turks and Caicos Islands Location within the Caribbean
- Coordinates: 21.914°N 71.991°W
- Country: United Kingdom
- Overseas territory: Turks and Caicos Islands
- District: North Caicos
- Climate: BSh

Kew is a village located on the island of North Caicos in the Turks and Caicos Islands, a British Overseas Territory. The village contains several small houses, churches, small shops, a library and a police station. The surrounding areas consist of heavy vegetation, earning Kew the nickname 'garden of the Turks and Caicos'.

== History ==
The village is named after Kew, (then) Surrey, England. It was formerly the capital of the Turks and Caicos Islands.

In the late 1700s, the village was the location of settlement by Loyalists that were granted settlement by the British crown in the aftermath of the American Revolutionary War. Large cotton plantations were built in the location of the village and operated into the 1800s. Ruins of these plantations include Teron Hill, St. James Hill and Wades Green Plantations.

The main attraction there is Wade's Green Plantation. The American Loyalist Wade Stubbs was granted land in 1789 in Kew by King George III of Great Britain as compensation for his lost land in British Florida that was confiscated by the Americans. Wade set up a sugar plantation there and had a large number of slaves working on it until his death in 1822 but before the Slavery Abolition Act 1833. Following the abolition of slavery, Kew ceased to be a major agricultural area in the Turks and Caicos Islands due to soil degradation, flora diseases and economic changes. This led to Wade's plantation to be abandoned until the 2010s when the ruins of the plantation house and outbuildings became promoted as a tourist attraction.
