= Speaker of the House of Assembly (Turks and Caicos Islands) =

- Coat of arms of the Turks and Caicos Islands
- Incumbent; Gordon Burton since 4 March 2021
- Style: Mr Speaker (informal and within the House); The Honourable (formal and diplomatic)
- Member of: House of Assembly
- Appointer: Elected by the House of Assembly approved and sworn in by the governor
- Term length: At the pleasure of the House; Elected by the House at the start of each Parliament, and upon a vacancy
- Deputy: Deputy Speaker
- Salary: $48,000

The speaker of the House of Assembly is the presiding officer of the Turks and Caicos Islands' House of Assembly, the legislature of the British Overseas Territory of the Turks and Caicos Islands. The current speaker, Gordon Burton, was elected speaker on 4 March 2021.

The speaker presides over the House's debates, including determining which members may speak. The speaker is also responsible for maintaining order during debate, and may punish members who break the rules of the House. The speakers remain strictly non-partisan.

== List of speakers ==
=== Speakers of the Turks and Caicos Islands Legislative Council ===
Name	Term		Ref
Name	Start	End	Ref
George Edmund Morrison Ewing, OBE	?	?	
William Henry Mills, OBE	1980	1987	
Larry Allan Coalbrooke	1988	1990	
Rosita Beatrice Missick-Butterfield, SCM, MBE	1991	1993	
Austin Alexander Robinson, OBE	1994	1994	
Winston Rudith Outten	1995	1998	
Emily Augusta Saunders	1998	1999	
Felix O'Neal Delancy	2000	2002	
Glennevans Clifton Clarke	2003	2007	

=== Speakers of the Turks and Caicos Islands House of Assembly ===
Name	Term		Ref
Name	Start	End	Ref
Clayton S. Greene	March 2007	August 2009	
Robert Hall	28 November 2012	28 October 2016	
Dwayne Taylor	29 December 2016	24 December 2020	
Gordon Burton	5 March 2021	incumbent	

== Sources ==
- Chief Ministers and Premiers
