= Falmouth Hospital (Falmouth, Jamaica) =

- Western Regional Health Authority

Geography
- Location: Rodney Street (also called Foreshore Road), Falmouth, Jamaica, western Caribbean, Trelawny Parish, Jamaica
- Coordinates: 18.4964°N 77.6607°W

Organisation
- Type: government-owned hospital

Services
- Emergency department: has emergency services

History
- Founded: ca. 1954

Falmouth Hospital is a hospital in Falmouth, Jamaica. It is owned by the Western Regional Health Authority, a Jamaican government agency. Located on the coast in the northwest part of Falmouth, Falmouth Hospital is a general-use hospital that includes an emergency department. In 2007 two new surgical theatres were built at a cost of $350 million (in Jamaican dollars; $3.2 million US dollars). However, as of January 2014, the new theatres were used as office space for the hospital administration. All surgeries were still being performed in the old surgical facility, constructed in 1954. The hospital was possibly established in 1954.

Falmouth Hospital has struggled in the past to keep its services running. In 2003, an article in The Gleaner, the local newspaper, quoted various persons who said the hospital was in dire need of equipment, including a backup generator when electricity to the hospital failed. Rev. Eron Henry said, "There is a feeling that this hospital is being deliberately starved of resources so that one day it will be justifiably closed." The Western Regional Health Authority said at that time it had no plans to downgrade or close the hospital. The article said steps were being taken to acquire a generator and Falmouth Mayor Jonathan Bartley said steps were being taken to improve drainage in the area to reduce flooding.
