= Victoria Jubilee Hospital =

Geography
- Location: Kingston, Jamaica
- Coordinates: 17.9768246°N 76.7954588°W

Services
- Beds: 248

History
- Former name: Victoria Jubilee Lying-In Hospital
- Opened: 9 May 1892

Links
- Website: serha.gov.jm/hospitals/vjh
- Lists: Hospitals in Jamaica

Victoria Jubilee Hospital (initially known as the Victoria Jubilee Lying-In Hospital) was founded in 1891 and opened to the public in 1892 in Kingston, Jamaica. The current facility, the largest maternity hospital in the English-speaking Caribbean, features 248 beds and delivers around 8,000 babies annually.

== History ==
As a tribute to Queen Victoria in memory of her Golden Jubilee, the Victoria Jubilee Lying-In Hospital began as a public subscription project and was then endowed by the Government of Jamaica. It was planned as a public hospital for poor women to provide them with suitable food and lodging, and medical care, under the supervision of trained professionals, during their confinement. In addition, from the beginning, a nursing training program was planned to train competent practitioners to service community health needs.

The hospital was built in 1891 and opened to the public on 9 May 1892 located on North Street between Rose Lane and West Street. A two-story building, surrounded by a wide verandah, it featured modern accommodations and electricity. The ground floor had twelve rooms for student nurses, as well as offices for the matron and doctor. The upper floor contained two wards of six beds, two lying-in rooms, and a bathroom, as well as one private room if a patient could afford to pay. To the rear of the main building was an isolation ward for infectious patients, a laundry, kitchens, and a bath house. The grounds were planted with ornamental plants and trees from the Botanical Garden. The first doctor employed by the hospital was Michael Grabham and Miss Davis, a certified nurse was hired from London, as the matron.

The majority of the training for student nurses was practical and the intent was to relocate trainees throughout the country after completion of their education. Pupil nurses were assigned patients in rotation administered medicines and monitored their condition, acting as assistants to the matron and physician. Lectures were given to acquaint students with proper treatment techniques, varied conditions, and complications they might encounter during their rounds. Particular attention was paid to infant care and passing on information to mothers so that they could maintain the health of their children. Though sometimes controversial, the hospital accepted all patients, including single mothers, but gave preference to married women if space was limited.

Through the years, various expansion projects took place in the period from 1950 to 1975, which resulted in an additional 150-bed availability and new administration offices.
