= Bustamante Hospital for Children =

Coordinates: 17°59′59″N 76°46′40″W

Geography
- Location: Kingston, Jamaica

Organisation
- Care system: Medicare

Services
- Beds: 283 (5 for ICU)

History
- Founded: 1963

Links
- Website: Bustamante Hospital for Children

Jamaica Hospital for Children is a children's hospital in Kingston, Jamaica, located on Arthur Wint Drive in the Kingston 5 district of the city, near the national stadium Independence Park and the Bob Marley statue. It is the only children's hospital amongst English speaking nations in the Caribbean.

== History ==
The Bustamante Hospital for Children was established in 1963 and has serves approximately 35,887 outpatients and 70,331 casualties per year. It has 283 including 5 ICU beds. It was a former British Military Hospital but was transformed into a children's hospital after the British left in 1962 (gifted by British government following Jamaica's independence) and was named after the then Prime Minister, Sir Alexander Bustamante.

== Services ==
The hospitals services available includes:

- General Medicine
- Cardiology
- Neurology
- Asthma
- Respiratory ailments
- Nephrology
- Dermatology
- Rheumatology
- General Surgery
- Neurosurgery
- Orthopedics
- Urology
- Ears, Nose and Throat (ENT)
- Plastic and Burns
- Ophthalmology

The hospital also has a Medical Social Worker programme providing counseling to children.

== Awards ==
The Bustamante Hospital for Children received the Senior Nursing Administration Award (SANG award) in 2012. This award constitutes the enactment and adherence of policies, professional conduct of the Nursing staff and overall operations of the Nursing department.
