= List of companies of Jamaica =

Location of Jamaica

Jamaica is an island country situated in the Caribbean Sea, consisting of the third-largest island of the Greater Antilles. Jamaica is a mixed economy with both state enterprises and private sector businesses. Major sectors of the Jamaican economy include agriculture, mining, manufacturing, tourism, and financial and insurance services. Tourism and mining are the leading earners of foreign exchange. Half the Jamaican economy relies on services, with half of its income coming from services such as tourism. An estimated 1.3 million foreign tourists visit Jamaica every year.

== Notable firms ==
This list includes notable companies with primary headquarters located in the country. The industry and sector follow the Industry Classification Benchmark taxonomy. Organizations which have ceased operations are included and noted as defunct.

Notable companies Status: P=Private, S=State; A=Active, D=Defunct
Name	Industry	Sector	Headquarters	Founded	Notes	Status	
Air Jamaica	Consumer services	Airline	Kingston	1968	Airline, defunct 2015	P	D
Alpart	Basic materials	Aluminum	Nain	1969	Aluminum	P	A
Beaches Resorts	Consumer services	Hotels	Ocho Rios	1997	Hotels	P	A
Bob Marley Museum	Consumer services	Recreational services	Kingston	1987	Museum	P	A
CGM Gallagher	Financials	Insurance brokers	Kingston	1971	Insurance broker	P	A
Desnoes & Geddes	Consumer goods	Brewers	Kingston	1918	Brewery	P	A
Digicel	Telecommunications	Mobile telecommunications	Kingston	2001	Mobile network	P	A
Dolphin Cove Jamaica	Consumer services	Travel & tourism	Ocho Rios	2001	Tourist attraction	P	A
Fly Jamaica Airways	Consumer services	Airlines	Kingston	2011	Airline, defunct 2019	P	D
Gleaner Company	Consumer services	Publishing	Kingston	1834	Newspaper, publisher	P	A
GraceKennedy	Conglomerates	-	Kingston	1922	Financials, industrials, retail	P	A
GSB Co-operative Credit Union	Financials	Banks	Kingston	1944	Credit union	P	A
Hedonism Resorts	Consumer services	Hotels	Negril	1976	Resort	P	A
Ian Fleming International Airport	Industrials	Industrials transportation	Boscobel	2009	Airport	P	A
International AirLink	Consumer services	Airlines	Montego Bay	1996	Charter airline	P	A
J. Wray and Nephew Ltd.	Consumer goods	Distillers & vintners	Kingston	1825	Distiller	P	A
Jamaica Air Shuttle	Consumer services	Airlines	Kingston	2009	Airline, defunct 2013	P	D
Jamaica Observer	Consumer services	Publishing	Kingston	1993	Newspaper	P	A
Jamaica Pegasus Hotel	Consumer services	Hotels	Kingston	1973	Hotel	P	A
Jamaica Public Service	Utilities	Utilities	Kingston	1923	Monopoly utility in Jamaica	P	A
Jamaica Stock Exchange	Financials	Investment services	Kingston	1968	Primary exchange	P	A
Lasco Jamaica	Conglomerates	-	Kingston	1994	Industrials, financials, pharma	P	A
National Commercial Bank of Jamaica	Financials	Banks	Kingston	1977	Banking	P	A
Norman Manley International Airport	Industrials	Transportation services	Kingston	1948	Airport	P	A
Petroleum Corporation of Jamaica	Oil & gas	Exploration & production	Kingston	1975	State-owned oil	S	A
Port Authority of Jamaica	Industrials	Transportation services	Kingston	1972	Ports and shipping	S	A
Postal Corporation of Jamaica	Industrials	Delivery services	Kingston	2000	Postal services	S	A
Rose Hall	Consumer services	Travel & tourism	Montego Bay	1770	Tourist attraction and museum	P	A
Sandals Resorts	Consumer services	Hotels	Montego Bay	1981	Hotels and resorts	P	A
Sangster International Airport	Industrials	Transportation services	Montego Bay	1940	Airport	P	A
Skylan Airways	Consumer services	Airlines	Kingston	2010	Airline, defunct 2012	P	D
Stewart's Automotive Group	Consumer goods	Automotive	Kingston	1938	Auto dealers/repairs	P	A
Studio One	Consumer services	Broadcasting & entertainment	Kingston	1954	Record label, defunct 1980	P	D
Television Jamaica	Consumer services	Broadcasting & entertainment	Kingston	1997	Television	P	A
TimAir	Consumer services	Airlines	Montego Bay	1983	Charter airline	P	A
Tinson Pen Aerodrome	Industrials	Transportation services	Kingston	1940	Airport	P	A
Tuff Gong	Consumer services	entertainment	Kingston	1970	Record label	P	A
Union Bank of Jamaica	Financials	Banks	Kingston	2000	Bank, defunct 2001	P	D

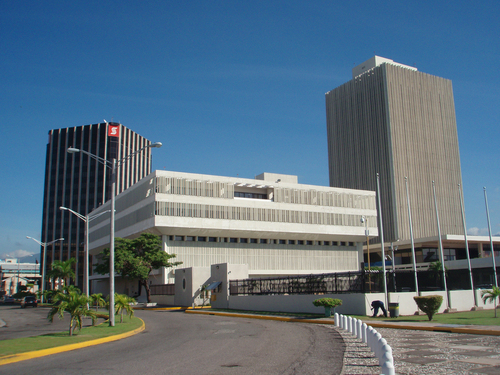
Downtown Kingston, Scotia Bank and the Bank of Jamaica

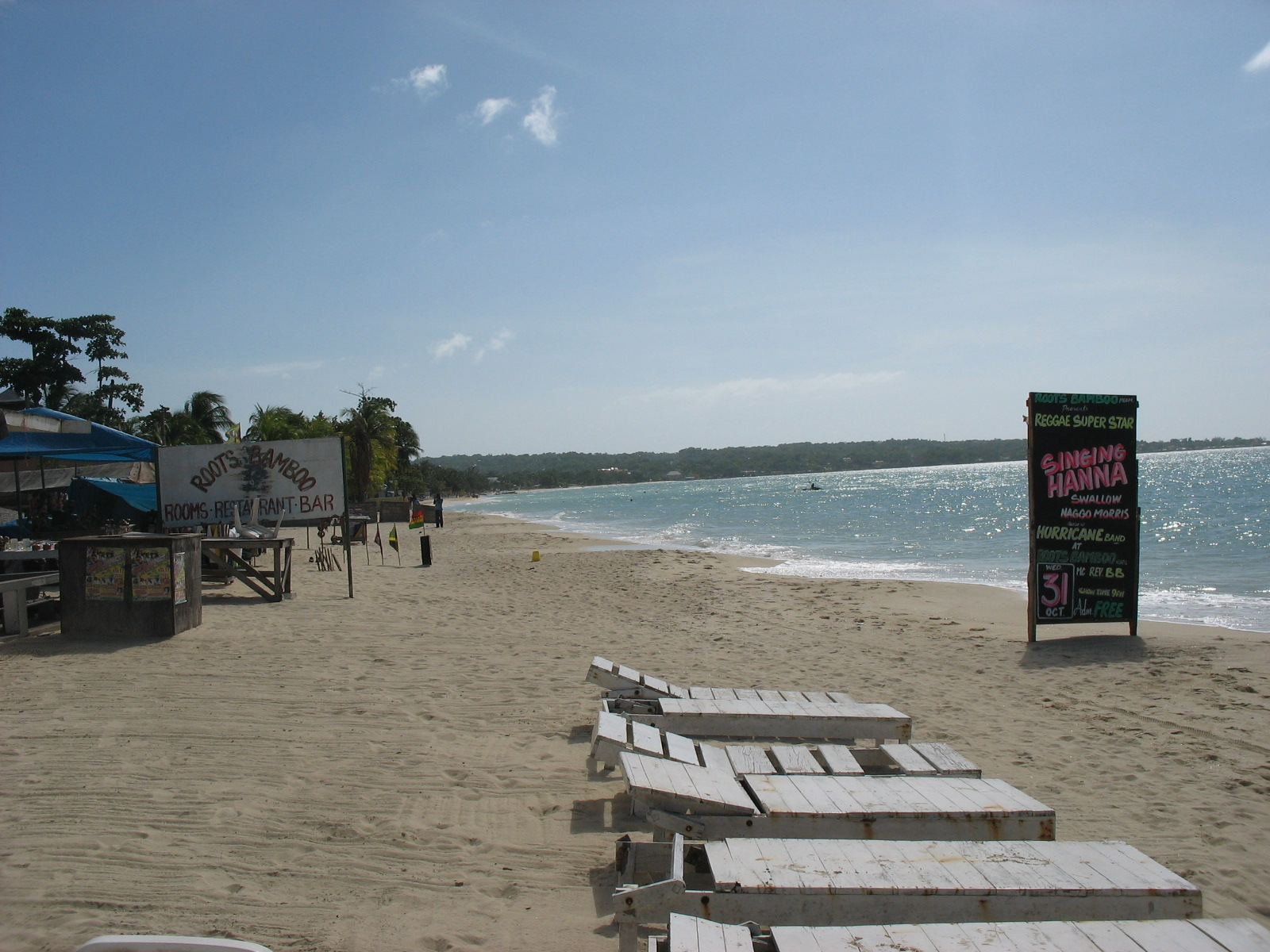
A beach in Negril with a hotel and restaurant

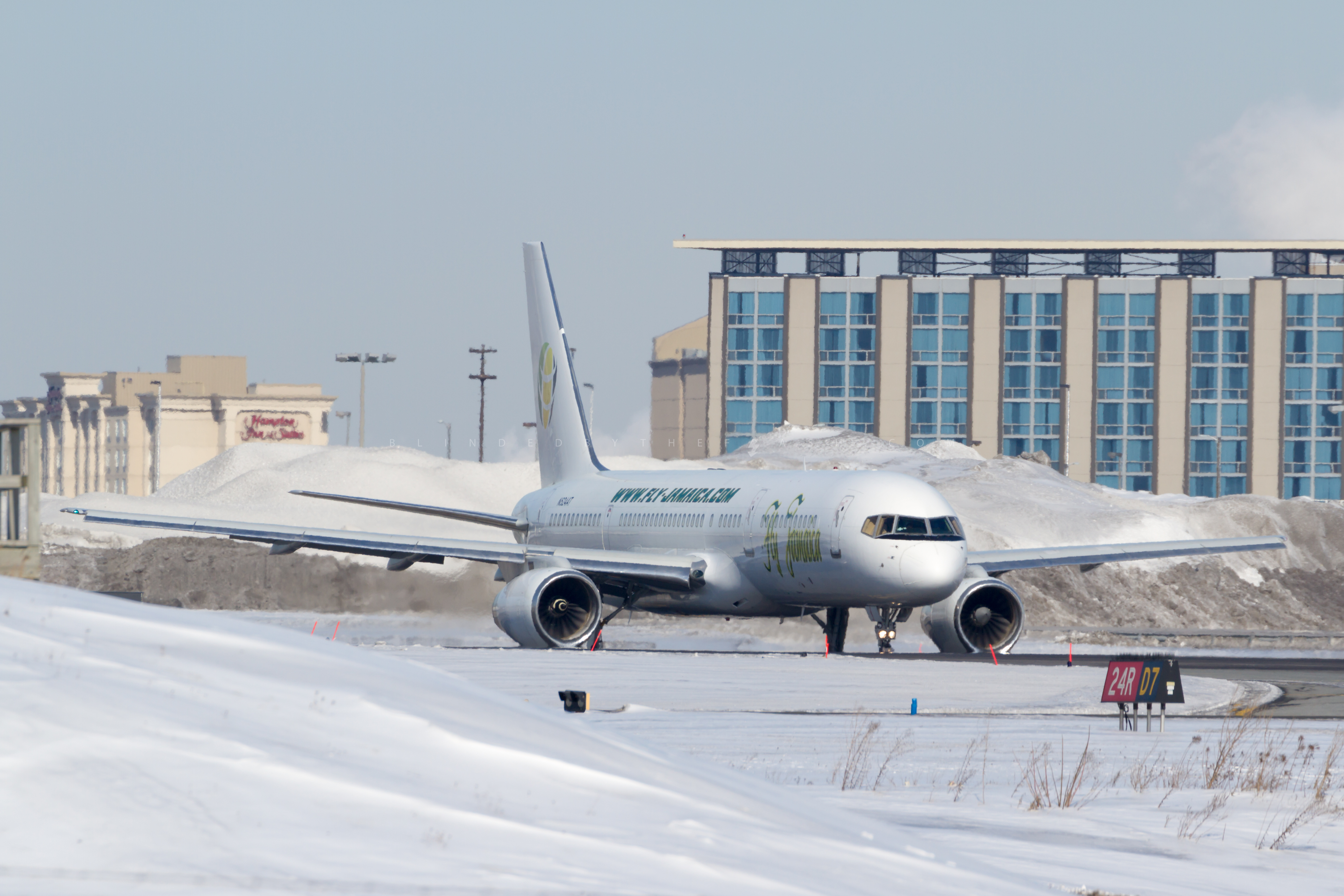
A Fly Jamaica Airways Boeing 757-200

== See also ==
- Economy of Jamaica
- List of airlines of Jamaica
- List of hotels in Jamaica
