= List of airlines of Jamaica =

This is a list of airlines operating in Jamaica.

== Active ==
Airline	Image	IATA	ICAO	Callsign	Founded	Notes
AirLink Express		I4	IOU		1996	
Exec Direct Aviation			EDA		2010	
Fly Oriole		FO	FLR	ORIOLE	2020	
Jam Air		J0	LJM	COOL RUNNINGS	2019	Virtual airline.
TimAir					1983	

== Defunct ==
Airline	Image	IATA	ICAO	Callsign	Founded	Ceased operations	Notes
Air Caribbean Transport			ACT		1968	1970	
Air Jamaica		JM	AJM	JAMAICA	1968	2015	Merged into Caribbean Airlines
Air Jamaica Express		B9	JMX	JAMAICA EXPRESS	2001	2005	
Eastern Caribbean Express		JQ	JMX		1995	2001	Rebranded as Air Jamaica Express
EC Xpress		JM			2000	2001	
Fly Jamaica Airways		OJ	FJM	GREENHEART	2012	2019	
Jamaica Air Shuttle		J6	ARW	JAMAICA SHUTTLE	2010	2013	
Skylan Airways			SKN	SKYLAN	2009	2012	
Trans-Jamaican Airlines		JQ	JQA		1975	1995	

== See also ==
- List of airlines of the Americas
- List of defunct airlines of the Americas
