= Royal Bank of Trinidad and Tobago =

Commercial bank in Trinidad and Tobago

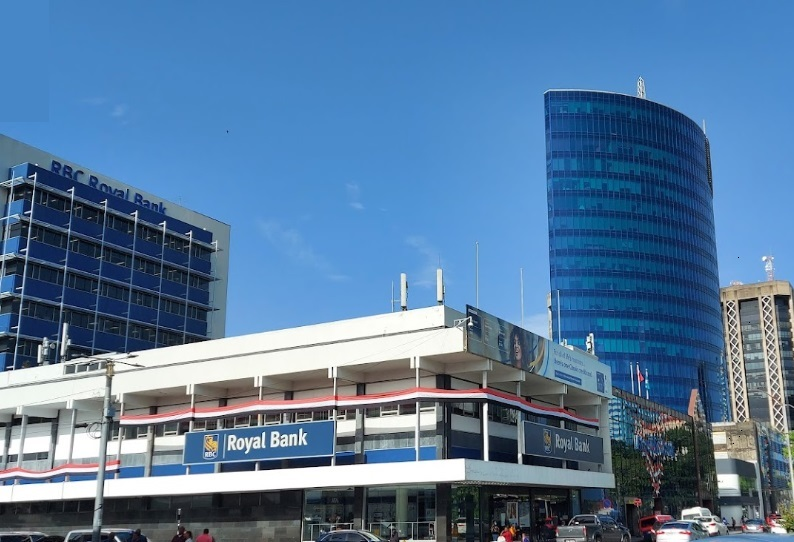
- Agency in Port of Spain
- Company type: Subsidiary
- Traded as: TTSE: RBTT
- Industry: Bank
- Founded: 1972 in Trinidad and Tobago
- Defunct: June 2008
- Headquarters: Port of Spain, Trinidad and Tobago
- Products: Financial services
- Parent: Royal Bank of Canada (1910–1972; 2008)
- Website: https://www.rbc.com/caribbean.html

The Royal Bank of Trinidad and Tobago (RBTT) was a commercial bank based in Trinidad and Tobago and one of the largest commercial banking corporations in the Caribbean region. As of 2008, RBTT Holdings had a group asset base of over US$6.2 billion dollars. The RBTT group of companies operated several commercial banking businesses in other neighbouring islands, as well as various investment holdings in various parts of the Trinidad and Tobago economy. On 26 March 2008, RBTT Shareholders voted 98.18 percent in favour of selling the bank to the Royal Bank of Canada (RBC), who previously had divested the bank in 1987. On 16 June 2008, RBC completed the acquisition. RBTT Financial Holdings Limited and RBC Holdings (Trinidad & Tobago) Limited, a subsidiary of RBC, will amalgamate and continue as a wholly owned indirect subsidiary of RBC. The head office of the Caribbean operations for RBC will be located at Port of Spain, the capital of Trinidad and Tobago, and the site of RBTT's headquarters.

== History ==
RBTT's history in Trinidad and Tobago began in 1902 when the Union Bank of Halifax, based in Nova Scotia, Canada, opened a branch in Port of Spain. Union Bank, like many other Canadian banks, was drawn to the West Indies by the flourishing trade between the Canadian Maritimes (e.g. Nova Scotia) with the wider West Indies region. In 1910 the Royal Bank of Canada (RBC) acquired the Union Bank. In time RBC expanded its operations from a single location to several different branches across Trinidad and Tobago.

In 1962, Trinidad and Tobago gained its independence from the United Kingdom. With several independent countries in the former British West Indies engaging in left-leaning policy experiments, seen by many as heading down the road towards socialism or "Communism", many Canadian banks were seeking to sever their ties in the Caribbean region so as to avoid having their operations nationalized.

- 1972 RBC, at the urging of the local government, incorporated the Royal Bank of Trinidad and Tobago (RBTT) to take over its operations in the country.
- 1985 RBTT formed Caribbean Banking Corporation Limited (CBC), its first venture outside of Trinidad and Tobago, to acquire the branch operations of the Royal Bank of Canada in St. Vincent and the Grenadines. CBC was a 50/50 joint venture with the Neal & Massy Group. CBC is now RBTT Bank Caribbean.

By 1986, RBC had divested itself of 53% of its shares in RBTT. Then in 1987 RBC divested itself of its remaining shares in RBTT, putting 100% of its shares in the hands of local shareholders, including 21% in the hands of bank employees. To propel future growth, the bank created the parent holding company known as the Royal Bank of Trinidad and Tobago, Limited for banking operations. In 1990, RBTT decided to transform The Royal Bank of Trinidad and Tobago Limited into a full-fledged regional institution offering financial services across the Caribbean.

- 1991 CBC (now RBTT Bank Caribbean) established a branch at Bequia, in the Grenadines.
- 1992 CBC established a branch in Antigua.
- 1993 CBC established itself in Saint Lucia.
- 1995 RBTT acquired St. Maarten Commercial Bank and changed its name to Antilles Banking Corporation (Sint Maarten).
- 1996 RBTT, with the encouragement of the Eastern Caribbean Central Bank, acquired a 94% interest in the Nevis Corporative Bank, established in 1955, and changed its name to Caribbean Banking Corporation (SKN). RBTT also acquired Nevis Banking Company (est. 1955), and merged it into CBC (SKN). RBTT acquired the McLaughlin Bank in Curaçao, and changed the name to Antilles Banking Corporation (Curaçao).
- 1997 RBTT acquired a 50% interest in the Grenada Bank of Commerce (est. 1983), which it has since increased to 62%. RBTT also acquired Neal & Massy’s 50% interest in CBC, making CBC a wholly owned subsidiary. This is now RBTT Bank Caribbean, with branches in St. Lucia, Antigua, St. Vincent, and Bequia, and owns RBTT Bank (SKN) in Nevis and RBTT Bank Grenada.
- 1998 RBTT acquired the First National Bank of Aruba, with two subsidiaries offering both onshore and offshore services. The bank also formed RBTT Financial Holdings Limited, a new holding company.
- 1999 Antilles Banking Corporation acquired the operations of the Chase Manhattan Bank in St. Maarten. RBTT restructured its ownership and Grenada Bank of Commerce became a subsidiary of CBC.
- 2000 RBTT acquired FINSAC's 99.9% shareholding in Union Bank of Jamaica . The bank changed its name to RBTT Bank (Jamaica). Union Bank was the result of a merger of the business of four (4) FINSAC controlled commercial banks and their three (3) allied merchant banks, all seven of which sought Government intervention when faced with insolvency: Citizens Bank; Eagle Commercial Bank; Island Victoria Bank; Workers Savings & Loan Bank; Citizens Merchant Bank; Corporate Merchant Bank; and Island Life Merchant Bank.
- 2000 Antilles Banking Corporation (Curaçao) N.V acquired all of ABN AMRO branches in Curaçao and Bonaire. Antilles Banking Corporation (Sint Maarten) acquired the operations in Sint Maarten. RBTT merged the operations of ABN AMRO Netherlands Antilles and ABC and continued the combined business under the name RBTT Bank Antilles. ABN AMRO held a minority of the shares in ABC for a maximum period of up to three years. ABN AMRO traced its origins in the Netherlands Antilles back to Edwards, Henriquez & Co., established in 1856 in Curaçao, whose main activity was trade and sea transportation.
- 2000 First National Bank of Aruba acquired ABN AMRO’s branches in Aruba. RBTT merged the banking activities of ABN AMRO Aruba and First National Bank of Aruba and continued the combined business under the name RBTT Bank Aruba. First National Bank of Aruba also owned Banco Nacional de Hipotecas, a licensed mortgage bank.
- 2000 RBTT acquired all of ABN AMRO Bank’s branches in Suriname through its wholly owned subsidiary RBTT Bank (Suriname).

On 22 April 2002, the bank celebrated its 100th anniversary and rebranded itself legally to the acronym form of the Royal Bank of Trinidad and Tobago or "RBTT". This led to a regional rebranding of all RBTT businesses of the financial group. Today, all commercial banking subsidiaries carry the RBTT brand in their official name.

- 2003 RBTT acquired Ernst & Young Trust Corporation in Barbados and renamed it RBTT Trust Corporation.
- 2004 RBTT acquired Caribbean Commercial Bank in Barbados. This is now RBTT Bank Barbados.
- 2005 RBTT opened a representative office in Costa Rica as the first step in a strategy of greater involvement in Central America.
- 2007 RBC announced it would acquire RBTT, which would mark the return of RBC to Trinidad and Tobago after an absence of 20 years.
- 2008 RBTT shareholders voted in favour of the acquisition by the Royal Bank of Canada; the transaction was completed in June 2008.

=== Stock market ===
The company was listed on the Trinidad and Tobago Stock Exchange (TTSE) under the symbol RBTT. RBTT shareholders are receiving both cash and RBC shares for their stock in RBTT. RBC is considering listing depository receipts for RBC shares on the TTSE.

== Subsidiaries and units ==
- Trinidad and Tobago
  - RBTT Bank Limited - Trinidad and Tobago
  - RBTT Insurance Agency Limited
  - RBTT Merchant Bank Limited
  - RBTT Trust Limited
  - West Indies Stockbrokers Limited
- Aruba
  - RBTT Bank Aruba N.V.
- Barbados
  - RBTT Bank Barbados Limited
  - RBTT Trust Corporation
- Grenada
  - RBTT Bank Grenada Limited
  - RBTT Bank Caribbean Limited (see also Nevis)
- Netherlands Antilles
  - RBTT Bank N.V. (in Curaçao)
  - RBTT Bank N.V. (in Sint Maarten)
- Saint Kitts and Nevis
  - RBTT Bank Caribbean Limited (see also Grenada)
  - RBTT Bank (SKN) Limited
- Suriname
  - RBTT Bank (Suriname) N.V.

== Associate companies ==
- Guardian Life of the Caribbean Limited (life insurance)
- Guardian General Insurance Limited (general insurance)

== Largest competitors ==
- Barbados National Bank
- Citibank
- CIBC Caribbean
- National Commercial Bank of Jamaica
- Scotiabank
- Republic Bank of Trinidad and Tobago
