= Truran =

Truran is a surname. Notable people with the surname include:

- Ian G. Truran, chief executive officer of Clarien Bank Limited
- James W. Truran (1940–2022), American astrophysicist
- Trevor Truran (born 1942), British mathematics teacher and game creator
