= Jamaica Air Shuttle =

IATA	ICAO	Call sign
J6	ARW	JAMAICA SHUTTLE
- Founded: 9 June 2009
- Commenced operations: 7 December 2009
- Ceased operations: 19 June 2013
- Hubs: Tinson Pen Aerodrome
- Frequent-flyer program: Frequent Flyer Program
- Fleet size: 2
- Destinations: 7
- Headquarters: Kingston, Jamaica
- Key people: Christopher Read (Managing Director & CEO); Simon Angoy (Director)
- Website: http://www.jamaicaairshuttle.com/

Jamaica Air Shuttle was a domestic and western Caribbean regional airline based at the Tinson Pen Aerodrome in Kingston, Jamaica. The airline began service on 7 December 2009, offering "on-demand" scheduled and private charter services to Jamaica's international and domestic airports.

== History ==
Jamaica Air Shuttle is a privately held Jamaican airline, operating nineteen scheduled round-trip services per week between Kingston's Tinson Pen Aerodrome and Sangster International Airport in Montego Bay. The airline's hub is Tinson Pen Aerodrome on Marcus Garvey Drive in Kingston. Jamaica Air Shuttle has suspended its flight operations as of 18 February 2013.

The company formed after the principals of Jamaica's Airways International Limited and Carib Aviation Limited, a now-defunct airline that previously operated from Antigua and Barbuda, merged operations to provide scheduled service to passengers needing to travel between Kingston and Montego Bay. Private charters within Jamaica, and between the island's international airports and regional cities in Haiti, the Dominican Republic, the Cayman Islands, and Cuba are also available.

After several months of operation, the company announced that it would be expanded its scheduled service Cayman Brac, Port-au-Prince in Haiti and Santiago de Cuba in Cuba.

The airline was grounded on 18 February 2013, as the owner of the planes the company uses pulled out of business. After failing to gain new investors, the company ceased operations.

== Fleet ==
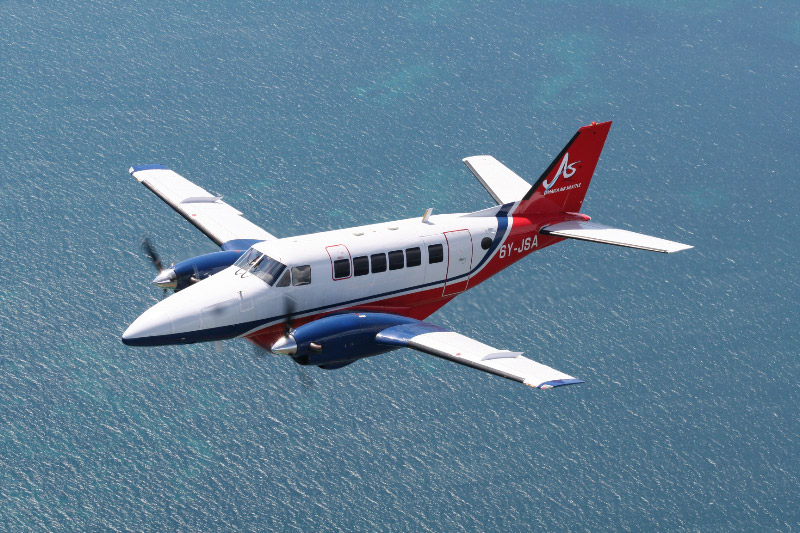
A Jamaica Air Shuttle Beech Model 99 in flight.

Jamaica Air Shuttle fleet
Aircraft	In fleet	Orders	Passengers	Notes
Beechcraft Model 99	2	0	12	Returned to Lessor
Total	2	0		

== Destinations ==
Currently, Jamaica Air Shuttle served domestic airports and aerodromes across Jamaica. Its hub is Tinson Pen Aerodrome in Kingston (KTP), and its other major gateway was Sangster International Airport in Montego Bay (MBJ).

Charter service was available between Tinson Pen (KTP) and Sangster International Airport (MBJ)and the following domestic airports and aerodromes:

- Tinson Pen Aerodrome (KTP) Hub
- Ken Jones Aerodrome, Port Antonio (POT)
- Ian Fleming International Airport, Boscobel (OCJ)

Regional service was also available to the following Caribbean destination:

- Toussaint Louverture International Airport, Port-au-Prince, Haiti (PAP)
- Antonio Maceo Airport, Santiago de Cuba, Cuba (SCU)

== Frequent Flyer Program ==
Jamaica Air Shuttle offered its Frequent Flyer Program to passengers who foresaw continued use of the airline's domestic service. The loyalty program was introduced in December 2009, and provided passengers with the opportunity to pre-purchase blocks of tickets for domestic travel. This pre-purchase facilitates unrestricted travel for passengers, including the ability to make flight changes and cancel booked flights without incurring any fees. In addition, passengers are not subject to changes in air fare; pre-purchased tickets attract a set air fare.

Each block of ten tickets purchased for domestic travel came with an additional eleventh "free" ticket, which thereby allowed passengers to experience overall savings of 25% off the normal fare.
