= OCJ =

OCJ may refer to:

- IATA code for Ian Fleming International Airport
- Japanese Orthodox Church
- Ontario Court of Justice
- Orange County Jail
