= CIBC Caribbean =

Barbadian subsidiary of CIBC

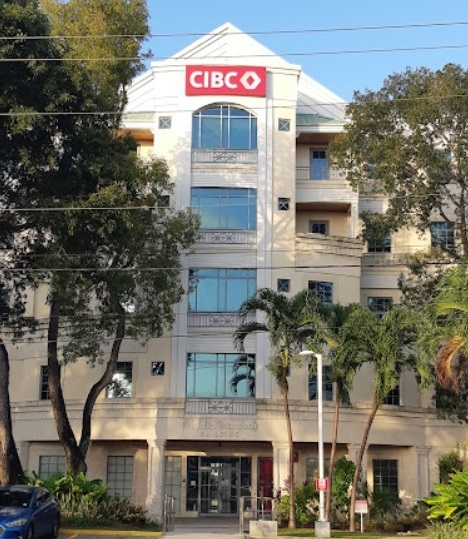
- Micheal Masoor building, Head office in Barbados
- Formerly: FirstCaribbean International Bank CIBC FirstCaribbean
- Type: Public Subsidiary
- Traded as: TTSE: FCI; BSE:: FCI
- Industry: Bank
- Founded: 2002; 24 years ago, in Saint Michael, Barbados
- Headquarters: Warrens, Barbados
- Key people: David Ritch (Chairman); Mark St.Hill (CEO)
- Products: Financial services
- Net income: US$141.5 million (2017)
- Total assets: US$12.4 billion (2018)
- Owner: Canadian Imperial Bank of Commerce
- Number of employees: 3000
- Parent: CIBC (Canadian Imperial Bank of Commerce)
- Website: www.cibc.com/fcib/

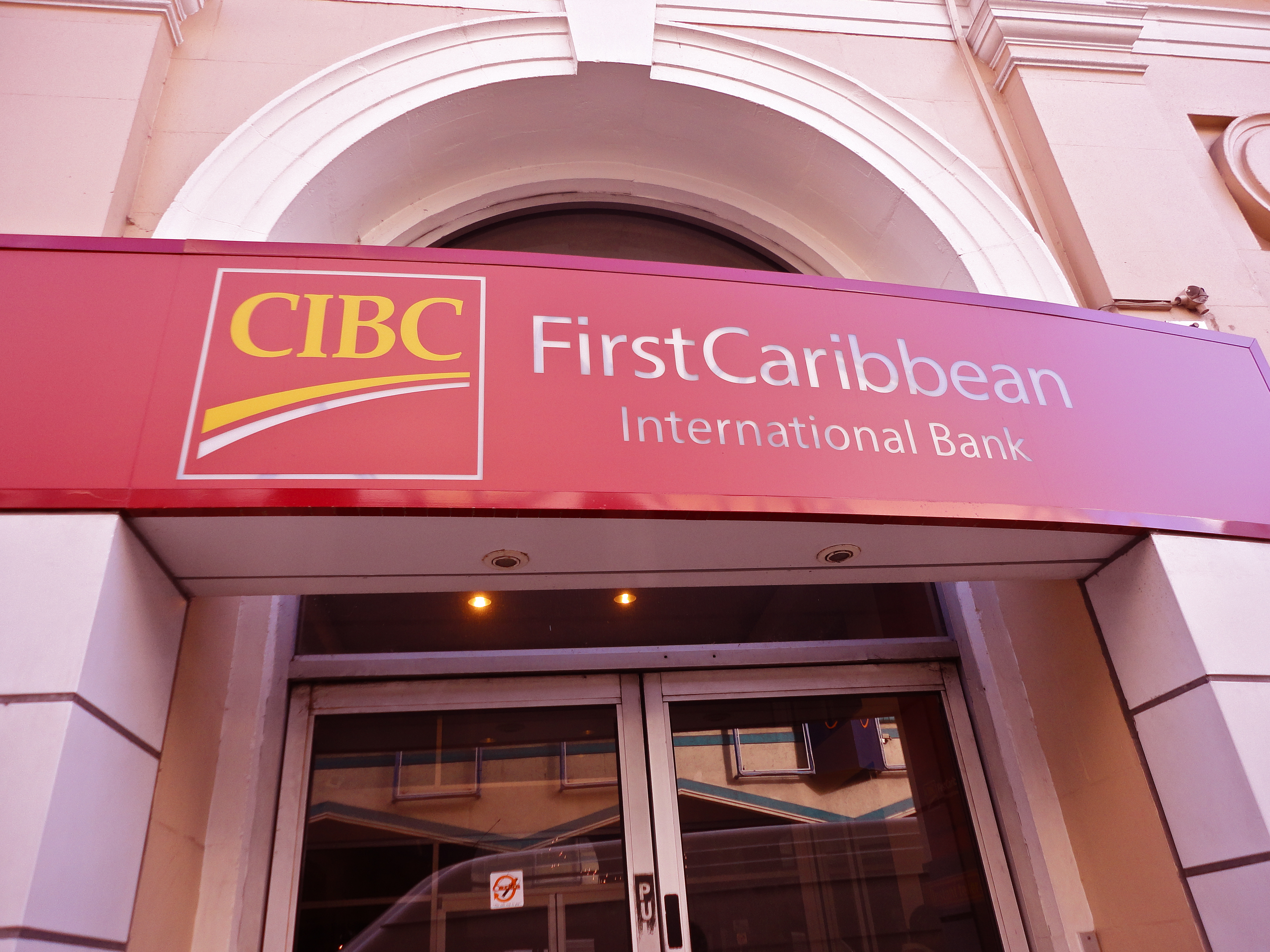
CIBC Caribbean branch in Bridgetown, Barbados.

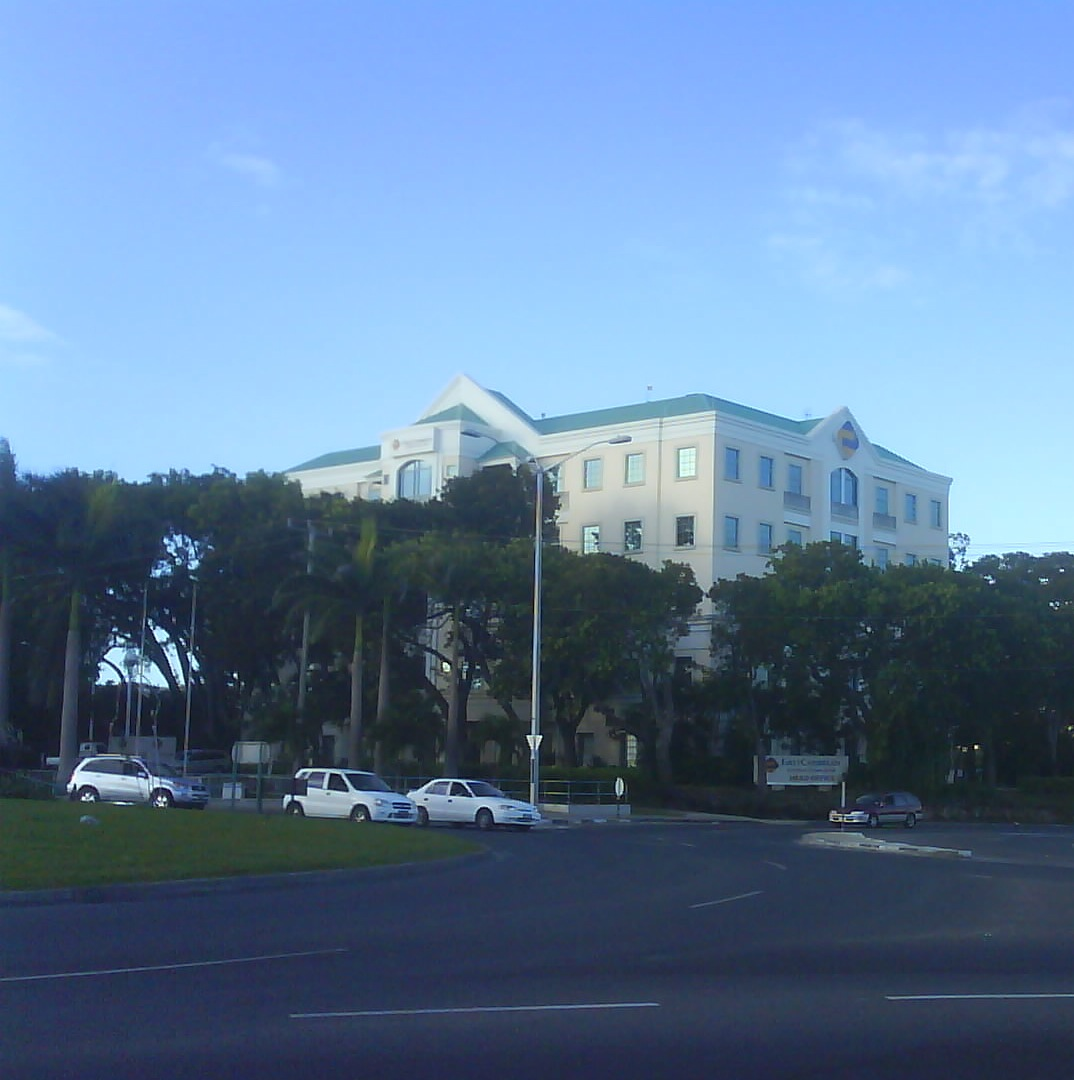
CIBC Caribbean's head office, Warrens, St. Michael.

CIBC Caribbean is a financial services company based in Barbados and the Caribbean subsidiary of the Canadian Imperial Bank of Commerce (CIBC). The bank was founded in 2002 as FirstCaribbean International Bank through the merger of the Caribbean operations of Barclays Bank and CIBC, and in March 2006 both CIBC and Barclays announced that Barclays wished to exercise their option to exit the Caribbean venture completely resulting in CIBC gaining majority-control of the bank. In June 2011, it was announced the bank would be renamed CIBC FirstCaribbean Bank "to be more closely aligned to the CIBC brand, while still maintaining the FirstCaribbean name and local identity." The name was then later changed CIBC Caribbean in January 2024. The majority of the bank's revenues are generated by its operations in Barbados, the Bahamas and the Cayman Islands.

On May 28, 2026, it was announced that the Bermuda-based Butterfield Bank will acquire CIBC Caribbean for US$1.8 billion through cash and stock consideration, with anticipated closing in the first half of 2027.

== History ==
Prior to 2002, the operations of what is now CIBC Caribbean were run as the separate businesses of Barclays Bank and CIBC West Indies, part of CIBC's group of companies. Barclays had been active in the region since 1836 and CIBC's foray into the region began with branches in Jamaica in 1920.

In March 2006, CIBC officials announced their intention of buying majority control of their publicly held Caribbean joint venture the FirstCaribbean International Bank. The deal costing just over US$1billion (Bds$2 billion) would purchase the current 43.7% owned by Barclays Bank PLC and would raise CIBC's current ownership to 87.4%, from 43.7%. Upon closure of the deal, the top four Caribbean commercial banks would be consolidated merely to a top three, with those being Scotiabank, the FirstCaribbean International Bank, and the Royal Bank of Canada with a possible distant fourth-place bank varying in each territory. Following the deal, the regional head-office for FCIB was expected to remain located in Barbados, with that regional centre continuing to report to the Toronto CIBC head-office. The deal closed on December 23, 2006.

=== CIBC absorbs Barclays share (2006) ===
On March 13, 2006, CIBC and Barclays announced that they had signed a non-binding letter of intent enabling CIBC to acquire 43.7% of the shares of FCIB from Barclays. Upon completion of the transaction, CIBC's ownership was to increase to approximately 87.4% of FCIB.

CIBC announced on 22 December 2006 that it had purchased 599,401,230 shares of FirstCaribbean from Barclays for US$988,652,389 (representing US$1.62 per share plus accrued but unpaid dividends). Barclays also retained their option to tender all or a part of the remaining holdings of 66,600,137 shares. Thereafter, CIBC proceeded with a mandatory purchase offer to all remaining shareholders at US$1.62 per share and wound up holding 91.5% of First Caribbean International Bank.

CIBC Caribbean is not the only Canadian controlled bank in the region: Scotiabank, and the Royal Bank of Canada also have extensive commercial banking businesses in the region and treat the region as a native market.

=== Cancelled plans for United States IPO (2018) ===
In March 2018, CIBC announced that it had filed a Registration Statement on Form F-1 with the United States Securities and Exchange Commission relating to a proposed initial public offering (IPO) in the United States of CIBC FirstCaribbean's common shares on the New York Stock Exchange. Through the IPO, CIBC would divest itself of most of its 91.5% stake in FCIB to refocus capital and management resources on its other North American operations.

Due to a lack of interest in the American markets for CIBC's share, for "US$240-million by offering 9.6 million shares", the application for an IPO was withdrawn by CIBC on April 19, 2018.

=== Regulatory failure for proposed sale to GNB (2021) ===
CIBC, which owned in February 2021 nearly 92 per cent of FCIB, announced in late 2019 a transaction by which it would sell its share in FCIB to "GNB Financial Group, a company run by Colombian banker and real estate developer Jaime Gilinski." The transaction "failed to win regulators' approval because of uncertainty about the buyer". According to one report, "GNB Financial agreed to pay US$200-million in cash, and CIBC had promised to finance the rest of the purchase price, keeping a 24.9-per-cent stake in FirstCaribbean in the process... The lead regulator reviewing the deal was the Central Bank of Barbados, with additional oversight from the Eastern Caribbean Central Bank." The CIBC is in a hunt for capital to increase its CET1 ratio.

=== Sale to Butterfield Bank (2026) ===
On May 28, 2026, the Bermuda-based Butterfield Bank (Officially The Bank of N. T. Butterfield & Son Limited) and CIBC Caribbean jointly announced that the two parties have entered into a definite agreement for Butterfield Bank to acquire CIBC’s 91.7% interest in CIBC Caribbean Bank Limited for US$1.8 billion (US$1.1 billion in cash and US$703 million in Butterfield shares). Upon transaction closing in the first half of 2027, CIBC will retain 22% stake in the combined company and Butterfield will commence a mandatory take-over bid for the remaining 8.3% of total outstanding shares of CIBC Caribbean held by minority shareholders, with the objective of acquiring full ownership of CIBC Caribbean.

The combined entity under Butterfield Bank will create a sizeable financial instituion with US$29 billion in total assets, US$25 billion in total deposits, and notable market share in various Caribbean entities including Cayman Islands, Bermuda, Barbados, The Bahamas, and Turks and Caicos Islands.

Barclays served as lead financial advisor to Butterfield and CIBC Capital Markets served as financial advisor to CIBC Caribbean.

== Locations ==
CIBC Caribbean has branches in the following Caribbean countries and territories:

- Antigua and Barbuda
- Bahamas
- Barbados
- British Virgin Islands
- Cayman Islands
- Jamaica
- Sint Maarten:
- Saint Kitts and Nevis
- Saint Lucia
- Trinidad and Tobago
- Turks and Caicos Islands

CIBC Caribbean previously held branches in the following Caribbean countries and territories:

- Aruba
- Belize
- Curaçao:
- Dominica
- Grenada
- Saint Vincent and the Grenadines

=== Offshore ===
As well as providing financial services to residents of the Caribbean countries where it operates, CIBC Caribbean is also a provider of offshore financial services to non-residents.

=== Membership ===
CIBC Caribbean is a member of various Bankers Associations throughout the Caribbean region. Additionally CIBC also offers a co-branded University of the West Indies VISA-Classic, Gold or Platinum credit card for students, alumni and staff. CIBC Caribbean is also a member of:

- MasterCard Worldwide
- VISA International
- Maestro ATM Network
- CarIFS ATM Network
- MultiLink Network ATM network

CIBC Caribbean is listed on the Barbados Stock Exchange and the Trinidad and Tobago Stock Exchange; and was formerly listed on the Jamaica Stock Exchange, Bahamas Securities Exchange, and Eastern Caribbean Securities Exchanges.

== See also ==
- List of banks in the Americas
- Republic Bank - previously divested stake in Canadian Imperial Bank of Commerce (West Indies) Holdings Limited in 1994
