= JMX =

JMX may refer to:

- Air Jamaica Express
- Java Management Extensions
- Silacayoapan Mixtec
- The British YouTuber JMX (Joel Morris)
