= Republic Bank =

Caribbean bank and financial service provider

Republic Bank Limited

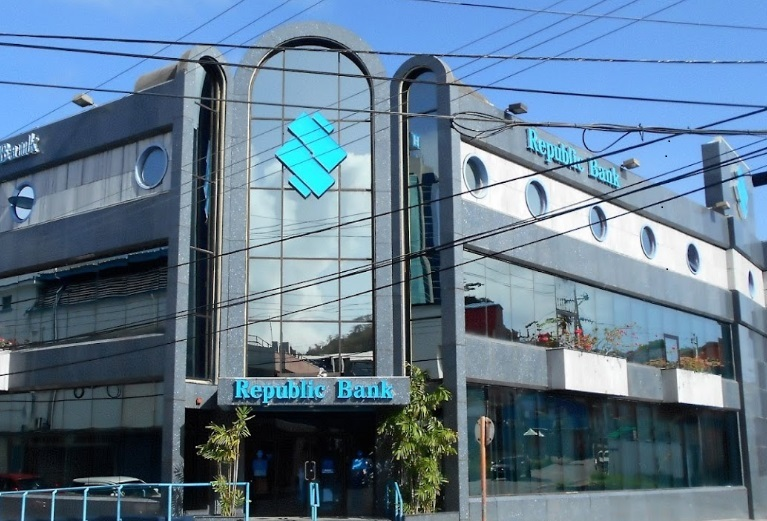
- Agency in Port of Spain
- Type: Public
- Traded as: TTSE: RFHL
- Industry: Financial services
- Founded: 1837; 189 years ago (as Colonial Bank), Trinidad and Tobago
- Headquarters: Port of Spain, Trinidad and Tobago
- Key people: Ronald F. Harford, chairman Nigel M. Baptiste, managing director
- Products: Financial services
- Website: http://www.republictt.com/

Republic Bank Limited is a Caribbean financial institution headquartered in Trinidad and Tobago. It has operations in Anguilla, Barbados, the British Virgin Islands, the Cayman Islands, Dominica, Ghana, Grenada, Guyana, St. Kitts and Nevis, Saint Lucia, St. Maarten, St. Vincent and the Grenadines, Suriname and Trinidad and Tobago. It was formerly a division of Barclays Bank in Trinidad and Tobago.

== History ==
=== As a subsidiary of UK banks ===
Flag of Republic Bank

The forerunner of Republic Bank, Colonial Bank, was established on 15 May 1837 by royal charter. John Irving MP was the first chairman. Colonial Bank was reported to have a "virtual monopoly" on banking in 19th century Trinidad.

In 1909 Colonial Bank established a branch on High Street, San Fernando.

In 1925 Colonial Bank merged with the Anglo-Egyptian Bank (est. 1864) and the National Bank of South Africa (est. 1891) to form Barclays Bank (Dominion, Colonial and Overseas) (Barclays Bank (DCO)). Barclays had inherited the ownership of Colonial Bank when it acquired London Provincial and South Western Bank in 1918. On 6 May 1926, Colonial Bank changed its name to Barclays Bank (DCO).

In 1939, as a result of the labor disturbances and the announcement that Britain was at war with Germany, the bank experienced a run.

In 1963, Barclays Bank acquired Bank of Trinidad, which was established in 1959.

On 1 April 1972, Barclays DCO became Barclays Bank International Limited. The local operation changed its name to Barclays Bank Trinidad and Tobago.

=== After Barclays ===
In the 1970s, with pressure for local control of the banking industry, Barclays Bank began a process of divestment of shares. In 1977 Barclays Bank Trinidad and Tobago sold the majority of its shares locally. This prompted another name change, to Republic Bank Limited, on 1 April 1981.

In 1989 Barclays sold its 41% holding to Colonial Life Insurance Co. (Trinidad). Colonial Life built up its holding to 46.7% and later reduced it to 34%.

In 1992 RB and Grupo Acedo-Mendoza established Acedo-Mendoza Fincor C.A., a confirming house with offices in Venezuela and Colombia as well as Trinidad. RB established Republic Bank Trinidad and Tobago (Cayman) Limited, a wholly owned offshore bank. RB purchased 51% of the National Commercial Bank of Grenada Limited, a commercial banking operation with eight branches on the islands of Grenada, Carriacou and Petite Martinique. (Note: The government of Grenada had founded the bank in 1979. In 1980, the bank acquired the shares of the Canadian Imperial Bank of Commerce (Grenada) and also purchased the assets of Royal Bank of Canada (Grenville).)

In 1994 RB purchased 23% of Bank of Commerce Trinidad and Tobago Limited. RB also purchased 20% of Canadian Imperial Bank of Commerce (West Indies) Holdings Limited. This gave RB linkages with the holding company's branches in the Caribbean islands of Barbados, St. Vincent, Antigua and Barbuda, St. Lucia and Jamaica. The shareholding is currently 14%.

In 1996, RB bought another 31.14% of Bank of Commerce, taking ownership up to 51.14%, making Bank of Commerce a subsidiary of Republic Bank.

In 1997 The purchase of approximately 10.9 million shares gave RB a total of 95.3% of the Bank of Commerce. RB also acquired 47.5% of the shares of National Bank of Industry and Commerce (NBIC) from the government of Guyana. (Note: National Bank of Industry and Commerce took over the operations in Guyana of Royal Bank of Canada, which left Guyana in 1984 when the government acquired 51% of the capital. In 1914 Royal Bank of Canada had acquired the activities of the British Guiana Bank, which had been incorporated in 1836 and had begun operations in 1837.)

In 1999 RB established Republic Bank (Barbados) as an offshore bank to complement the operations of its Cayman Islands subsidiary.

In 2003 RB acquired a 57% interest in the Barbados National Bank (BNB) in Barbados. (Note: In 1978 the government of Barbados created Barbados National Bank through an Act of Parliament that amalgamated three institutions that the government already owned: Barbados Savings Bank (est. 1852), Sugar Industry Agricultural Bank (est. 1907), and National Housing Corporation (Public Officers Housing Loan Fund; est. 1958). The three functional divisions of the Bank provided services for commercial banking, agricultural credit, and mortgage financing. Within days of the commencement of operations, Barbados National Bank acquired the banking business of Bank of America's branch in Bridgetown.) RB also acquired 93% of the failed Banco Mercantil (est. 1984), the sixth largest bank in the Dominican Republic. It has since rebranded Banco Mercantil as Republic Bank (D.R.) S.A. This was the first of Republic Bank’s overseas subsidiaries to fully adopt the Republic Bank corporate identity.

In 2006 RB rebranded NBIC as Republic Bank (Guyana).

In 2007 Republic Bank (DR) sold its operations. The acquirer was Banco BHD of the Dominican Republic.

In 2009, CL Financial (the parent of CLICO), had financial problems, and its shares came under the control of the Trinidad government.

In 2012 Republic Bank, which had accumulated a 65% stake in Barbados National Bank, renamed it Republic Bank (Barbados). Also in 2012, RB acquired 8.79% of the shares of HFC Bank (Ghana).

In 2013 RB acquired the remaining shares in Republic Bank (Barbados). Republic Bank delisted the shares of BNB from the Barbados Stock Exchange at end 2013. Also in 2013, RB increased its shareholding in HFC Bank (Ghana) to 40%, making it the largest single shareholder.

== Subsidiaries ==
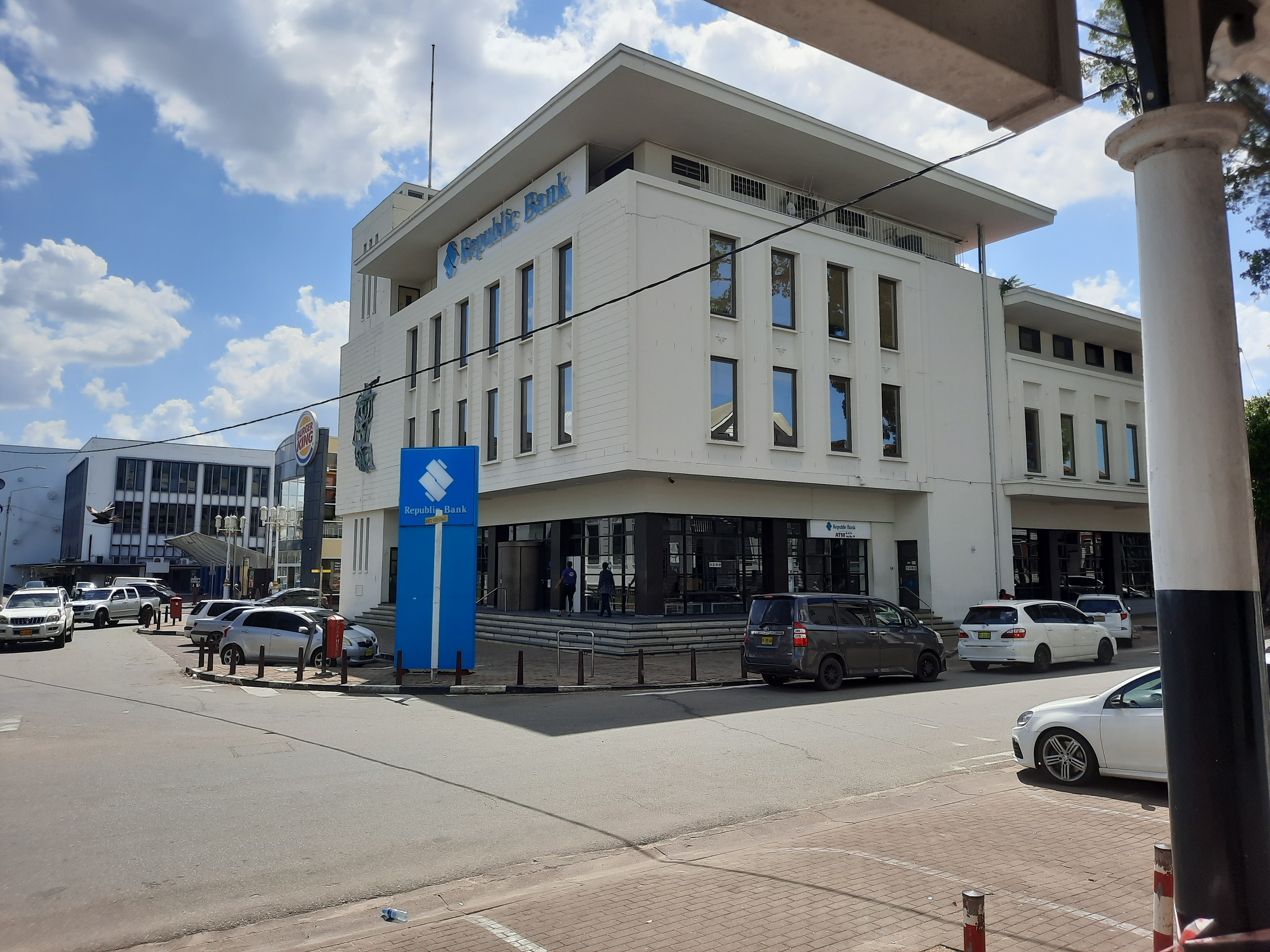
Agency in Paramaribo, Suriname

In addition to its main banking operations in Trinidad and Tobago, Republic Bank has the following subsidiaries

- Republic Finance and Merchant Bank Limited (FINCOR)
- Republic Bank (Grenada) Limited
- Republic Bank (Guyana) Limited
- Republic Bank (Suriname) Limited
- Republic Bank Trinidad & Tobago (Cayman) Limited
- London Street Project Company Limited
- Republic Bank (Barbados)
- Infolink Services Limited
- Securicor Trinidad Limited (now Group 4 Securicor Trinidad Limited after the worldwide merger of the operations of Securicor and Group 4 Falck in July 2004)
- The Home Mortgage Bank
- Republic Securities Limited

== Largest competitors ==
- Citibank
- CIBC Caribbean
- National Commercial Bank of Jamaica
- Scotiabank
- RBTT
- Royal Bank of Canada
