= Republic Bank (Guyana) =

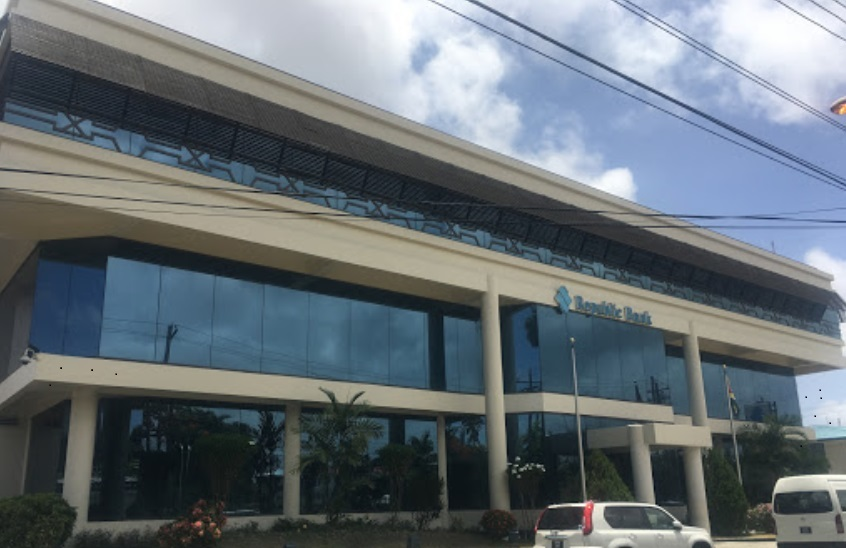
- Headquarters in Georgetown.
- Type: Sociedad Anónima
- Industry: Banking
- Founded: 1836
- Headquarters: Georgetown
- Key people: Nigel M. Baptiste, (Chairman); Stephen R. Grell, (Managing Director)
- Products: Commercial banking Retail banking Mutual fund
- Revenue: G$ 20,597 millions (2024)
- Net income: G$ 7,262 millions (2024)
- Total assets: G$ 350,628 millions (2024)
- Number of employees: 714 (2024)
- Parent: Republic Bank
- Website: www.republicguyana.com

Republic Bank (Guyana) Limited was formed in 1836 as the British Guiana Bank, which was the first commercial bank in British Guiana, now Guyana. As of 2024 it has 12 branches and 52 Automated Teller Machines (ATMs).

== History ==
In 1984, major foreign banks were nationalized: RBC became National Bank of Industry and Commerce (NBIC), Chase Manhattan Bank became Republic Bank, and Barclays changed to Guyana Bank for Trade and Industry Ltd. (GBTI). Republic Bank was later merged with GBTI.

In 1991 after an IMF Economic Recovery Programme initiated broad economic change to the country, shifting from the socialist policies to those of free markets, the government started selling shares of GBTI, and by 1994 it was entirely privately owned. Republic Bank, headquartered in Trinidad and Tobago, purchased the majority of shares of NBIC to become Republic Bank (Guyana) after recovering rights to the name from GTBI.

Republic Bank acquired Scotiabank operations in Guyana in 2019, which increased Republic Bank's share of Guyana's assets and deposits to 51%.
