= Skylan Airways =

Jamaican Airline

IATA	ICAO	Call sign
-	SKA	Skylan
- Founded: 2009
- Commenced operations: 2010
- Ceased operations: 2012
- Operating bases: Norman Manley International Airport
- Fleet size: 1 Handley Page Jetstream
- Headquarters: Kingston, Jamaica

Skylan Airways was a Jamaican airline that offered both scheduled and charter services. The airline was based at Norman Manley International Airport (NMIA) near Kingston and the Sangster International Airport (SIA) in Montego Bay.

== History ==
Skylan Airways submitted an application with the Civil Aviation Authority to operate a non-scheduled air service from Jamaica to points overseas in May 2009. The airline operated a single Jetstream 32, with a capacity of 19 passengers. The application was approved and in August 2009 the airline had its first test run. The same month, the airline launched round-trip charter flights between NMIA and SIA three times per week. In August 2010, the airline applied for permission to operate a non-scheduled air service until August 2013.

Skylan Airways flights in Kingston arrived and departed from the Norman Manley International Airport, General Aviation Centre. In Montego Bay the flights arrived and departed from the Sangster International Airport's new domestic terminal. Because of this passengers travelling domestic with Skylan Airways will not be processed by either Jamaican Immigration or Customs at either airport. It began charter operations in August 2009 and its inaugural scheduled flight was on October 29, 2010. In 2012 the airline ceased all operations.

== Domestic routes ==
KIN-Norman Manley International Airport to MBJ-Sangster International Airport.

- Skylan offered charter service from Montego Bay and Kingston to Ocho Rios/Boscobel - OCJ Ian Fleming International Airport -

== Charter routes ==
- Cuba — HAV-Havana, SCU-Santiago de Cuba
- Haiti — PAP-Port-au-Prince
- USA
- Grand Cayman
- Antigua
- Venezuela
- St. Lucia
- Aruba
- Bonaire
- Curaçao

The airline is available for charters to other Caribbean destinations.

== Aircraft fleet ==
- Jetstream 32EP
