= Ian G. Truran =

Ian G. Truran is the chief executive officer of Clarien Bank Limited. Truran was previously an executive with The Bank of N. T. Butterfield & Son Limited. He is a director and the treasurer of the International Charitable Foundation of Bermuda.

Truran has a Bachelor of Commerce degree from Dalhousie University (1992) and a Diploma of Graduation from the Stonier Graduate School of Banking and Wharton Leadership Certificate from The Wharton School (both 2013).
