= Guardian Holdings Limited =

- Company type: Public company
- Traded as: JSE: GHL; TTSE: GHL
- Founded: 1847
- Headquarters: Westmoorings, Trinidad and Tobago
- Areas served: English Caribbean and Dutch Caribbean
- Divisions: Life Insurance; Health Insurance; Pensions; Property and Casualty Insurance; Wealth, Asset Management; Life Insurance & Pension Fund Management
- Subsidiaries: Guardian Life of The Caribbean; Guardian General Insurance Limited; Guardian Asset Management and Investment Services Limited; Guardian Group Trust Limited; Guardian General Jamaica Insurance Limited; Guardian Life Limited
- Website: myguardiangroup.com

Guardian Holdings Limited is a conglomerate of insurance and financial services companies in the Caribbean. Its headquarters are in Westmoorings, Trinidad and Tobago and its history goes back to 1847. At one time it was known as Standard Life and the company has since been rebranded under the name Guardian Group.

Guardian Holdings Limited currently serves markets in 21 countries across the English and Dutch Caribbean, including Trinidad and Tobago, Barbados, Jamaica, Curaçao, Aruba, St. Maarten, and Bonaire with their products and services being marketed throughout the Eastern Caribbean, the Bahamas, Cayman Islands, the US Virgin Islands, and Belize.

The company is listed on the Jamaica Stock Exchange and Trinidad & Tobago Stock Exchange under the name GHL.

== History ==
Guardian Holdings Limited started in 1847 when Standard Life of Edinburgh, Scotland entered the market and started a branch office in Trinidad. Over time, Standard Life of Edinburgh closed operations and merged its Trinidad and Tobago portfolio with the portfolio of Jamaica Mutual Life Assurance Society on the 15th November, 1972.

Guardian Life of The Caribbean Limited was formed from this merger when the need for insurance companies to localise their operations came about, and this company was then incorporated on 30 December 1980 and registered under the provisions of Insurance Act, 1980.

The company expanded over the years with the acquisition of majority shareholding in Crown Life (Caribbean) Limited in 1990, which was later merged with the operations of Guardian Life of The Caribbean Limited in January 1993. Through this acquisition, Guardian Holdings Limited was able to enter the Dutch Caribbean market of Curaçao and Aruba.

Guardian Holdings Limited was then able to establish Guardian Life Limited in Jamaica in 1999, which followed the acquisition of the individual life and pension portfolios of Jamaica Mutual, Crown Eagle, Dyoll Life, and Horizon Life. The expansion into Jamaica continued with Guardian Holdings Limited acquiring the West Indies Alliance Insurance Company in 2001. Guardian Holdings Limited later acquired The Caribbean Home Insurance Company and following this, were able to merge the operations of the Trinidad and Tobago market and rebrand as Guardian General Insurance Limited, with the legal amalgamation of NEMWIL and Guardian General Insurance Limited in 2007.

== Rebranding ==
Guardian Group Logo with Tagline (2013 - Present)

In 2013, the decision was taken by the company and its subsidiaries to rebrand under the name “Guardian Group”, with it being a single brand and identity to represent the group. Despite having separate companies which are all legal entities, all companies under Guardian Holdings Limited carry a single brand name, logo and tagline of “Guardian Group”.
