= NCB Financial Group =

Financial group in Jamaica

NCB Financial Group Limited
- Type: Public company
- Traded as: JSE: NCBFG; TTSE: NCBFG
- Industry: Banking insurance investment management
- Founded: 1837
- Headquarters: Kingston, Jamaica
- Key people: Michael Lee-Chin (chairman); Patrick Hylton (president and group chief executive officer); Dennis Cohen (group chief financial officer and deputy chief executive officer)
- Revenue: ▲US$756 million (2018)
- Net income: ▲US$221 million (2018)
- Total assets: ▲US$7.6 billion (2018)
- Divisions: Retail & SME Banking; Payment Services; Corporate Banking; Treasury & Correspondent Banking; Wealth, Asset Management & Investment Banking; Life Insurance & Pension Fund Management; General Insurance
- Subsidiaries: National Commercial Bank Jamaica; NCB Capital Markets; NCB Insurance; Guardian Life; Guardian General Insurance; Clarien Bank
- Website: www.myncb.com

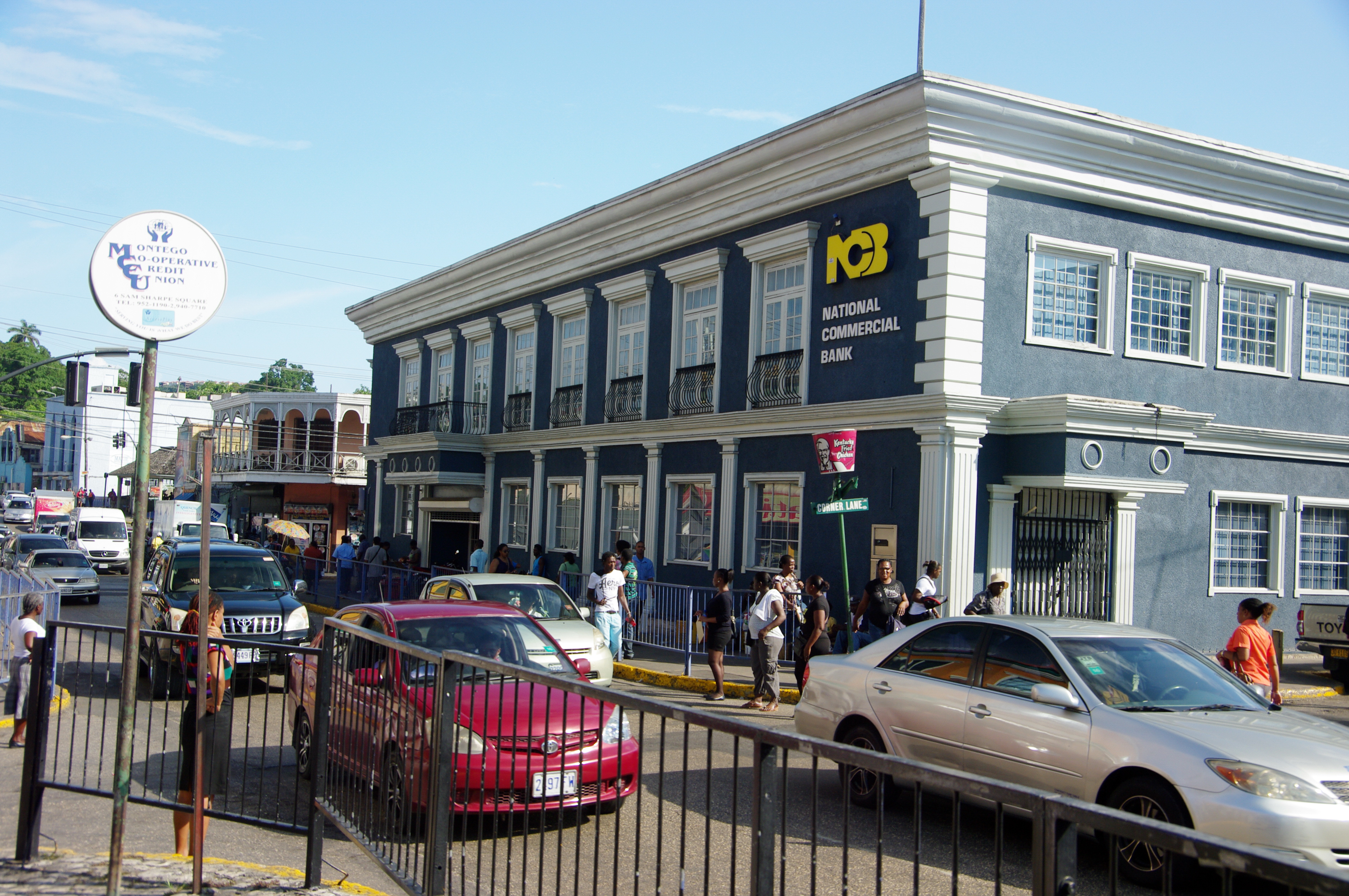
NCB Branch in Downtown Montego Bay, Jamaica

The NCB Financial Group Limited (JSE: NCBFG) is a financial services conglomerate operating in the Caribbean region and headquartered in Kingston, Jamaica. NCB Financial Group Limited is the parent company of the National Commercial Bank of Jamaica, the largest and most profitable financial institution in Jamaica. It is also the majority shareholder of Guardian Holdings Limited, one of the largest insurance providers in the Caribbean, and of Clarien Group Limited, a banking and investment management services provider based in Bermuda. The company is listed on the Jamaica Stock Exchange and Trinidad & Tobago Stock Exchange.

== History ==
The National Commercial Bank Jamaica Limited has roots dating back to 1837, when it began operations under the name of the Colonial Bank of London (England). From one branch at Harbour Street in Kingston, the bank grew to eleven branches across the island by 1925.

In 1925, Barclays Bank of London acquired the Colonial Bank, National Bank of South Africa and the Anglo-Egyptian Bank. The new organization was incorporated as Barclays Bank (Dominion, Colonial and Overseas), which later became Barclays DCO. In 1975, Barclays Bank DCO transferred its Jamaican operations to Barclays Bank of Jamaica, a wholly owned subsidiary.

The Government of Jamaica acquired all the shares of Barclays Bank of Jamaica in August 1977 and subsequently changed its name to National Commercial Bank Jamaica Limited (NCB). In 1985, NCB Group Limited was incorporated as a holding company in order to reorganize the structure of NCB and its subsidiaries. On the formation of NCB Group Limited, National Commercial Bank Jamaica Limited became a fully owned subsidiary and holders of shares in NCB received shares in NCB Group Limited through a swap. NCB Group Limited was listed on the Jamaica Stock Exchange in 1986.

Between 1986 and 1991, the Government of Jamaica divested 61% of its shares in NCB Group Limited, and sold the remaining 39% to Jamaica M&N Investments Limited (a joint venture of the Jamaica Mutual Life Assurance Society and Jamaica National Building Society) in 1992.

During a period of financial crisis in Jamaica in the mid 1990s, NCB experienced steep losses and an erosion in its capital base. In spite of a merger with Mutual Security Bank Jamaica Limited in 1996, NCB Group Limited was forced to seek government assistance in 1997. The Government of Jamaica, through its Financial Sector Adjustment Company (FINSAC), acquired 68% of NCB Group Limited for J$19.5 billion, which was used to purchase bad debts and recapitalize the business.

The mandate of FINSAC was to help to stabilize profitability for NCB and to divest the shares it had acquired as soon as possible. Consequently, NCB developed and implemented a FINSAC-approved rehabilitation plan, which involved maintaining minimum capital adequacy ratios of 12% and accelerating the divestment of non-core financial services subsidiaries. As a result of the successful execution of its rehabilitation plan, NCB reported a net profit of J$405 million for the year ended September 30, 1999, representing a significant turnaround from its loss of J$1 billion in the previous year.

In 2000, NCB Group Shareholders approved a Scheme of Arrangement put forward by the NCB Group Board, and as a result, received one ordinary share in a new parent company in exchange for each ordinary share held in NCB Group Limited. The name of the new parent company reverted to National Commercial Bank Jamaica Limited, and its shares were listed on the Jamaica Stock Exchange, replacing the old NCB Group Limited shares.

In 2002, Portland Holdings, a privately held investment holding company owned by Jamaican-Canadian businessman Michael Lee-Chin, acquired (through its subsidiary AIC Limited) 75% of National Commercial Bank Jamaica Limited from FINSAC for J$6 billion. Under Lee-Chin's stewardship as chairman, NCB experienced significant growth, increasing its annual net income from US$6 million in 2002 to US$106 million in 2015.

In April 2016, NCB Financial Group Limited (NCBFG) was incorporated as a financial holding company for the National Commercial Bank Limited and future acquisitions. NCBFG acquired a 29.99% interest in Guardian Holdings Limited in Trinidad & Tobago in May 2016 and in December 2017, acquired a 50.1% majority stake in Clarien Group Limited, which owns Clarien Bank Limited based in Hamilton, Bermuda.

In May 2019, NCBFG completed its takeover of Guardian Holdings Limited with the acquisition of an additional 74.23 million shares, which doubled its ownership of the regional insurance group to 62%, at a cost of J$28 billion (US$207 million).

== See also ==
- Michael Lee-Chin
