= Tinson Pen Aerodrome =

Domestic airport in Kingston, Jamaica

- IATA: KTP; ICAO: MKTP

Summary
- Airport type: Public
- Operator: Airports Authority of Jamaica
- Serves: Kingston, Jamaica
- Elevation AMSL: 16 ft (4.9 m)
- Coordinates: 17°59′19″N 076°49′26″W

Map
- Location in Jamaica

Runways
Direction	Length		Surface
Direction	ft	m	Surface
14/32	4,300	1,311	Asphalt
- Sources: AAJ, DAFIF

Tinson Pen Aerodrome (IATA: KTP, ICAO: MKTP) in Kingston, Jamaica is the largest of Jamaica's three domestic airports. It is located on Marcus Garvey Drive, a major highway that links Kingston to the nearby residential community of Portmore. The airport is also located near the Kingston Free Zone, a transshipment port. The airport catered mainly to business travellers. The airport also provided a commercial link between the cities of Kingston and Montego Bay. Tinson Pen Aerodrome handled approximately 92,091 passengers in 2001.

== Facilities ==
The airport is at an elevation of 16 ft (5 m) above mean sea level. It has one runway designated 14/32 with an asphalt surface measuring 4,300 ft × 100 ft (1,311 m × 30 m). There is a 100LL fueling station and the airport supports night flight operations.

== Airlines and destinations ==
The airport formerly had scheduled passenger service provided by Air Jamaica Express and International AirLink.

== Statistics ==
The following table shows the number of passengers using the airport annually from 1997 through 2001.

	1997	1998	1999	2000	2001
Passengers	62,079	71,380	87,572	89,887	92,091
