= Air Jamaica Express =

Airline of Jamaica (1973–2005)

IATA	ICAO	Call sign
B9	JMX	JAMAICA EXPRESS
- Founded: 1973 (as Jamaica Air Taxi)
- Commenced operations: 18 April 1996
- Ceased operations: 14 October 2005
- Hubs: Norman Manley International Airport
- Frequent-flyer program: 7th Heaven
- Parent company: Air Jamaica
- Headquarters: Kingston, Jamaica
- Key people: Gordon "Butch" Stewart

Air Jamaica Express was an airline based in Kingston, Jamaica, which, before folding, operated as a subsidiary of Air Jamaica. It operated domestic and inter-island scheduled flights and charter services. The airline was established in 1973 as Jamaica Air Taxi, and later operated as Trans-Jamaican Airlines until it was taken over by business man Gordon "Butch" Stewart, who also controlled Air Jamaica in 1994.

When Air Jamaica was renationalized in December 2004, responsibility for Air Jamaica Express remained with Stewart and his organization. The airline struggled financially and after attempts to reorganize and secure additional capital were unsuccessful, the airline ceased operations on October 14, 2005. The JQ code assigned by the IATA was later reassigned to Jetstar Airways.

== Services ==
In 2002, Air Jamaica Express served the following destinations:

Country	City	Airport	Notes
Jamaica	Kingston	Norman Manley International Airport	
Jamaica	Montego Bay	Sangster International Airport	
Jamaica	Negril, Jamaica	Negril Aerodrome	
Jamaica	Ocho Rios	Ian Fleming International Airport	
Jamaica	Port Antonio	Ken Jones Aerodrome	
Cayman Islands	George Town	Owen Roberts International Airport	
Cuba	Havana	José Martí International Airport	
Cuba	Santiago de Cuba	Antonio Maceo Airport	Seasonal
Haiti	Port-au-Prince	Toussaint Louverture International Airport	Seasonal
Turks and Caicos	Providenciales	Providenciales International Airport	Seasonal
Dominican Republic	Santo Domingo	Las Américas International Airport	Seasonal
Bahamas	Nassau	Lynden Pindling International Airport	Seasonal

Prior to Air Jamaica Express, predecessor air carrier Trans-Jamaican Airlines was operating ATR 42 turboprop service on a routing of Montego Bay - Kingston - Grand Cayman - Belize City, Belize - Cancun, Mexico twice a week in 1994.

== Fleet ==
In 2002, Air Jamaica Express was operating the following twin turboprop aircraft types:

Aircraft	Amount in Fleet	Passengers
De Havilland Canada Dash 8-100	6	37
De Havilland Canada DHC-6 Twin Otter	2	19

The airline also previously operated Short 360 turboprop aircraft and Dornier 228 aircraft as well as the following STOL capable piston engine prop aircraft during its existence:

- Britten-Norman Islander
- Britten-Norman Trislander

In addition, predecessor air carrier Trans-Jamaican Airlines operated ATR 42 turboprop aircraft.
