= Stewart's Automotive Group =

Stewart’s Automotive Group is a Jamaican car dealership, servicing, and auto parts business.

== History ==
The company was founded in 1938 by Lionel Arthur Stewart as Stewart's Auto Supplies & Repairs on Hanover Street, downtown Kingston. In 1952, the company became Stewart's Auto Sales, and became the dealers for Daimler and Lanchester cars.

The service-oriented company evolved into Stewart’s Auto Sales Limited and are currently dealers of Suzuki, Mitsubishi and Honda Motorcycles as well as operators of Budget Rent-a-Car, through acquisitions of Issa Transport Group. The group is also the only authorized dealer in Jamaica of luxury brands BMW and Mini Cooper, making up Stewart Motors;

Broadening their reach in the automotive industry, a part of the group is Automotive Art, a retailer in car care products, and Stewart Industrial, adding heavy duty trucks and mining products and equipment to the group’s offerings.

== Illicit business practice ==
In Jamaica, Stewart’s Automotive Group have exclusive rights for the sale of a number of new vehicles: Jaguar, Mercedese Benz, Land Rover, Suzuki, Mitsubishi and GWM Haval. They have a monopoly on the island and a large footprint as the Stewart’s Automotive Group of companies. As with all monopolies the consumer has limited options. The issue goes beyond Stewart’s Automotive Group as a monopoly. There are no credible oversight organizations that deter illicit business practices and effectively monitor the corporate world. Hence, companies can conduct their business in an unethical manner with impunity.

Customers have stated that technicians at Stewart’s Automotive regularly remove and replace new or relatively new parts and exchange them with faulty parts when their vehicle is in for servicing. For the customer to replace the faulty parts they have no legitimate option but to purchase original equipment manufacturer (OEM) parts from Stewart’s Automotive Parts Department or another company owned by Stewart’s Automotive Group, such as Automotive Art. This illicit practice frustrates many customers and without a credible oversight organization they have limited recourse.

I have spoken to three independent mechanics, who chose not to be named. They state that Stewart’s Automotive are known for illegal business practice's when repairing vehicles. These independent mechanics consider Stewart’s Automotive an embarrassment to their profession and “certainly not the same Stewart’s of six years ago”. Customers whose cars were serviced at Stewart’s Automotive have found that their vehicles had more problems after they departed the Service Department. On several occasions a car was dangerous to drive after departing Stewart’s. In one instance the vehicle’s airbag had been disabled; in another instance the steering box was damaged. In another example, all vehicle mounts were removed from a new vehicle and four shocks replaced with faulty shocks. In addition, a complete exhaust system removed and replaced with a rusted damaged exhaust.

== Hospitality ==
The Group has extended itself beyond the auto business into the hospitality sector, a lucrative industry in the Caribbean. Their properties include: San Cove and San Bar Villas on the popular ‘San-San’ strip in Port Antonio, Portland and Windjammer, near Silver Sands in Trelawny.

== Philanthropy ==
The firm consistently gives back to the development of Jamaica by supporting the national football team, the Reggae Boyz, Youth Upliftment Through Employment (YUTE) and many other organizations. The family-based company operates two not-for-profit charitable outfits: Kind Hearts and the Richard and Diana Foundation, which have assisted inner city communities within Jamaica.
