= AirLink Express =

Jamaican airline

IATA	ICAO	Call sign
I4	IOU	—
- Founded: 1996
- Hubs: Sangster International Airport
- Headquarters: Montego Bay, Jamaica
- Website: flyairlink.net

AirLink Express is an air charter airline based in Jamaica. The airline is located at Sir Donald Sangster International Airport (MBJ), Montego Bay. The airline offers charter and scheduled service to every airport in Jamaica. As of June 2018 the Jamaica Gleaner reports that the airline uses a Cessna 208B Grand Caravan.

== Destinations ==
AirLink Express has domestic services from its base at Sangster International in Montego Bay to Negril Aerodrome.

The company offers chartered flights from Montego Bay to Ian Fleming International Airport in Ocho Rios and Ken Jones Aerodrome in Port Antonio.

It previously provided scheduled services between Sangster International and Tinson Pen Aerodrome in Kingston.

== Fleet ==
AirLink Express fleet consisted of

- Cessna 206
- Cessna 207
- Cessna 208
- Beech 1900D
- Beech 1900C
