= Warrens, Barbados =

Coordinates: 13°09′N 59°36′W

Warrens
- Commercial Centre
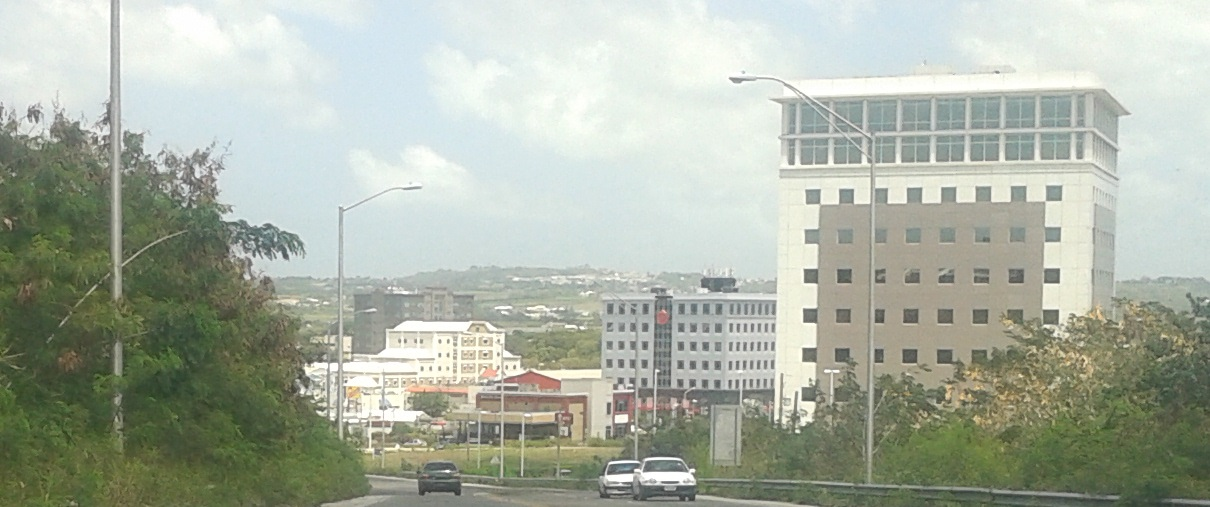
- Warrens skyline
- Interactive map of Warrens
- Country: Barbados
- Parish: Saint Michael
- Time zone: UTC-4 (Eastern Caribbean Time Zone)
- Area code: +1 246

The City of Warrens, located in the parish of Saint Michael, is one of the fastest developing areas in the country of Barbados. In the span of a few years beginning around the year 2000, the Warrens, Saint Thomas area has become synonymous with new money flowing into the country and for the development in the form of newly constructed tall buildings.

Upon the completion of two new towers in Warrens, it is estimated that roughly 350,000 square feet (33,000 m^{2}) of the island's 860,000 sq ft (80,000 m^{2}). of A-Class office space will be located in Warrens.

Traditional building-height restrictions in the central Bridgetown area, and the perseverance of Barbados authorities in not allowing full-scale conversion of Bridgetown's many traditional buildings into tall iron and glass works have led to many companies in Barbados choosing to locate in the Warrens area for their high-rise complexes.

In 2010, the government stated that road works were being conducted to mitigate the traffic problems in the area of Warrens.

== Government and infrastructure ==
The Ministry of Labour has its head office in the 3rd Floor West section of the Warrens Office Complex in Warrens.

== Retail and residential ==
In addition to the office complexes which characterize Warrens, there are several retail operations, catering both to those who work in the area and those who do not. The area around Warrens has become more favored for residential development.
