= CGM Gallagher =

Caribbean insurance broker

The CGM Gallagher Group is the Caribbean's largest insurance broker. It has offices in Jamaica, Barbados, St. Vincent and St. Lucia.

In the Eastern Caribbean, CGM Insurance Brokers was the name of the insurance broking company which began in Barbados in 1980 out of the Willis Agency. CGM began in Jamaica in 1971 as International Insurance Brokers Limited (IIB) evolving out of a partnership between the ICD Group, BNS and Hogg Robinson & Gardner Mountain Limited (Lloyds Brokers).

In 2004, CGM Insurance Brokers out of Barbados and IIB Jamaica merged to create the CGM Group with sole focus on commercial insurance segments. The majority of the Group’s shares are held by Jamaica-based ICD Group.

A year after the Barbados/Jamaica merger, the CGM Group established CGM Insurance Brokers St. Vincent Limited, which is now the largest brokerage in St. Vincent and the Grenadines. In 2007, Arthur J. Gallagher partnered with the Group to create the CGM Gallagher Group. Soon after, CGM Gallagher established CGM Gallagher Insurance Brokers St. Lucia Limited.

It also operates CaribRM, a risk management company which is the Facility Supervisor of the Caribbean Catastrophe Risk Insurance Facility - an insurance partnership between CARICOM and the World Bank. The CCRIF is the world's first multi-government regional parametric catastrophe insurance facility.

WI-allrounder Brendan Nash is sponsored by the Group.
