= Air Jamaica =

National airline of Jamaica (1968–2015)

IATA	ICAO	Call sign
JM	AJM	JAMAICA
- Founded: 27 August 1963
- Commenced operations: October 1968
- Ceased operations: 2015 (merged into Caribbean Airlines)
- Hubs: Kingston–Norman Manley; Montego Bay
- Focus cities: New York–JFK
- Frequent-flyer program: 7th Heaven
- Subsidiaries: Air Jamaica Express
- Parent company: Caribbean Airlines (2011–2015)
- Headquarters: Kingston, Jamaica

Air Jamaica was the flag carrier of Jamaica. It was owned and operated by Caribbean Airlines from May 2011, until the cessation of operations in 2015. Caribbean Airlines Limited, headquartered in Piarco, Trinidad and Tobago, had administrative offices for Air Jamaica located at Norman Manley International Airport in Kingston, Jamaica.

The Jamaican government was formerly the owner of Air Jamaica. It sold the airline to Caribbean Airlines in 2011, which resulted in the Jamaican government owning 16% of Caribbean Airlines.

== History ==
According to R.E.G. Davies in his Airlines of Latin America Since 1919, the first incarnation of Air Jamaica was founded on August 27, 1963, after the government of Jamaica decided not to invest in British West Indian Airways (BWIA). Dubbed Jamaica Air Service Ltd., its shareholders were the government of Jamaica (51 percent), the British Overseas Airways Corporation (BOAC), and BWIA (16 percent). BWIA's employees in Jamaica were transferred to the new airline. Service to Miami and New York began on May 1, 1966.

BOAC, Britain's major international airline at the time, and BWIA had continued to maintain the leased aircraft (this operating arrangement would not expire until the end of May 1969). The Jamaican government preferred a more independent approach and eventually prepared to establish a new company, Air Jamaica (1968) Ltd.

Air Jamaica was established in October 1968, and started operations on April 1, 1969, connecting Kingston (KIN) and Montego Bay (MBJ), with New York (JFK) and Miami (MIA). The Jamaican government owned a substantial part of the airline, with Air Canada owning a minority share (40 percent) and providing aircraft (one Douglas DC-8-61 and three McDonnell Douglas DC-9-30 jetliners), pilots, technical, maintenance and logistical help.

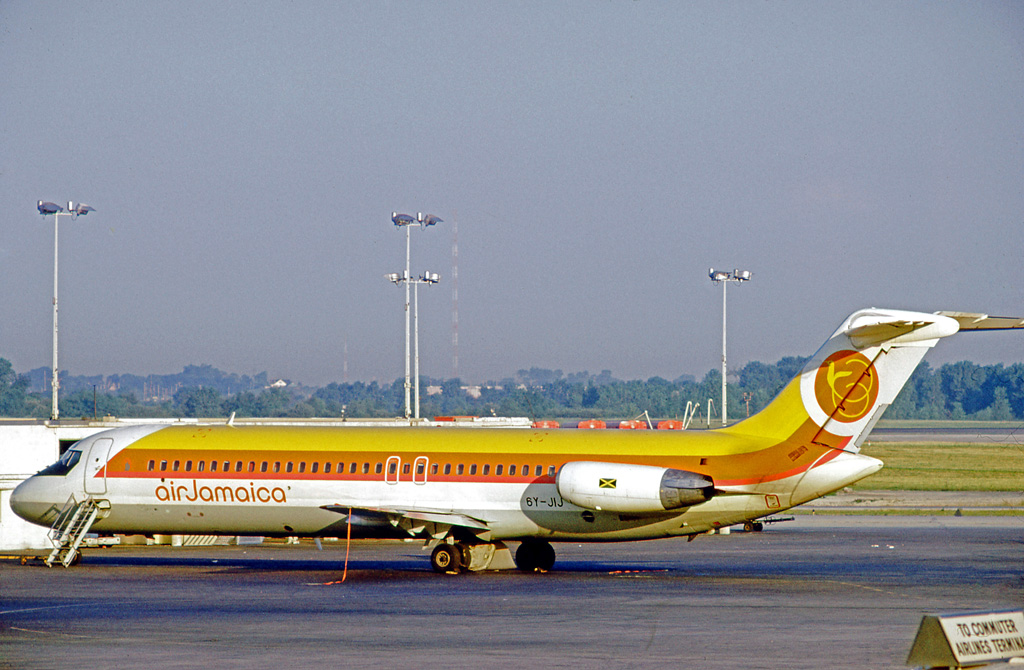
Douglas DC-9-32 of Air Jamaica at Chicago O'Hare International Airport in 1975

During the 1970s, Air Jamaica expanded rapidly. Flights were added to Toronto (YYZ) and Montreal (YUL) in Canada, to Luis Muñoz Marín International Airport (SJU) in San Juan, Puerto Rico, to Philadelphia (PHL) and many other destinations, especially across the Caribbean. Long-haul services to Europe were started on 1 April 1974. Air Jamaica used a Douglas DC-8 and three DC-9s for a large part of the 1970s, but the Boeing 727-200 became part of the fleet toward the end of the decade when the government bought out Air Canada's share. Growth slowed in the 1980s. New routes were opened to Baltimore (BWI) and Atlanta (ATL).

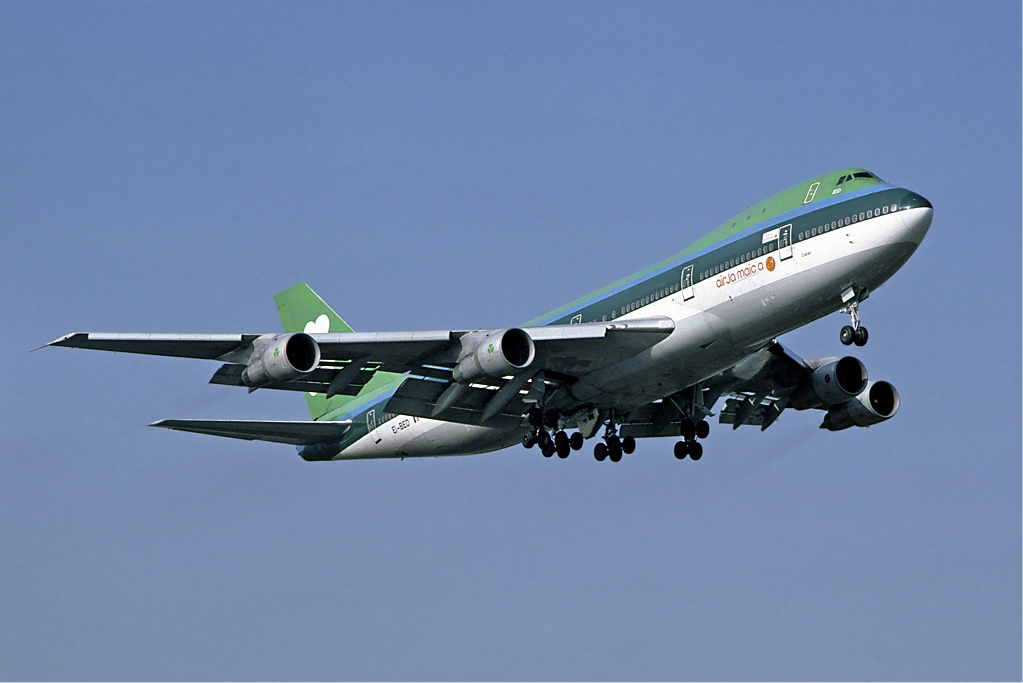
Air Jamaica leased a Boeing 747-100 from Aer Lingus in the early 1980s.

In 1983, Air Jamaica was operating nonstop Boeing 747-100 jumbo jet service between Kingston and London Heathrow Airport (LHR) with this flight continuing on from London to Frankfurt, Germany (FRA) and was also flying nonstop Airbus A300 service between Kingston and John F. Kennedy International Airport (JFK) in New York City.

In 1989, the Jamaican government announced plans for the privatization of the airline, which had been fully state owned since Air Canada divested its 40 percent shareholding in 1980. However, it was not until May 1994 that a partial selloff was announced, when a group of Jamaican and Canadian investors known as the Air Jamaica Acquisition Group (AJAG) agreed to acquire a 70 percent share of the carrier for $26.5 million. Another five percent share was earmarked for employees. The government retained responsibility for liabilities, which were considerable.

A merger of Air Jamaica with other Caribbean airlines was already being proposed, with British Airways invited to take a 25 percent holding in the venture. In the first stage, Air Jamaica was to have merged its operations with those of Trinidad and Tobago Airways, parent of BWIA. Guyana Airways Corporation and Leeward Islands Air Transport were to later join the venture.

During the 1990s, Air Jamaica continued to expand. The airline took over the Kingston-Nassau, Bahamas (NAS) route, which had been left by British Airways, began a code sharing agreement with Delta Air Lines and opened a route to Phoenix (PHX, which was later dropped), and to Frankfurt (FRA), London (LHR), Manchester (MAN), Santo Domingo (SDQ) and Ft. Lauderdale (FLL). The route to Phoenix was opened because Air Jamaica was looking to expand in the American west beyond its route to Los Angeles (LAX). In 1994 the company was partially privatized, the private investors were led by hotelier Gordon "Butch" Stewart with the government retaining 25 percent of the company and giving five percent to the airline's employees. It continued operating Airbus jetliners, including the wide-body Airbus A340, and began a feeder service, a frequent flyer program (7th Heaven), and an inflight magazine, named SkyWritings. In 1996, the airline was flying nonstop service between Kingston and London Heathrow Airport with an Airbus A310 jetliner. In 1999, Air Jamaica was operating nonstop service between Montego Bay and Los Angeles with Airbus A320 aircraft.

In December 2004, after financial losses, the government of Jamaica resumed full ownership of Air Jamaica. It employed 2,522 people as of March 2007.

By March 2010, Air Jamaica had net losses in 40 of its 42 years of existence, and an accumulated deficit of approximately $1.54 billion.

In 2007, the new Jamaican government began to consider privatization of Air Jamaica, seeking to remove an unsustainable venture from its balance sheet.

In October 2007, Bruce Nobles, President and Chief Operational Officer of Air Jamaica from May 2002 to June 2003, was asked to return. He replaced William Rogers, who was interim President and CEO of the airline since the October 2007 resignation of CEO Michael Conway.

On 4 July 2009, The Jamaica Gleaner reported that U.S.-based Spirit Airlines had reached an agreement with the Jamaican government to acquire the national airline.

On 17 December 2009, it was reported that the Prime Minister of Jamaica had recently approached the government of Trinidad and Tobago regarding a possible merger or acquisition by Caribbean Airlines.

It was decided that Air Jamaica would cease to operate under Jamaican ownership and be primarily run by Caribbean Airlines until the transitional process was complete. Caribbean Airlines acquired the airline's fleet and route rights on 1 May 2010, and opened a new hub at Kingston's Norman Manley International Airport. The acquisition made Caribbean Airlines the largest airline in the Caribbean. On 27 May 2011, Jamaican Finance Minister Audley Shaw and Trinidadian Finance Minister Winston Dookeran signed the shareholding agreement, making Caribbean Airlines the national airline of Jamaica with access to all routes operated by the former Air Jamaica. On 1 July 2011, all Air Jamaica and Caribbean Airlines's flights began operating under Caribbean Airlines's "BW" IATA code.

The airline operated scheduled services from Kingston and Montego Bay to seven destinations in the Caribbean, Canada and the United States. The airline's acquisition by Caribbean Airlines of Trinidad and Tobago was implemented on May 1, 2010. However the current owners intended to keep the name Air Jamaica for as long as they were in possession of the company.

The airline officially reopened operations on May 1, 2010, upon acquisition by Caribbean Airlines Limited. The new airline was owned by Caribbean Airlines Limited of which the government of Jamaica held 16 percent of shares. The acquisition by Caribbean Airlines also gave the company exclusive rights to the Air Jamaica name for one year, with options for annual renewal. On January 14, 2011, the Air Jamaica brand was relaunched at the Norman Manley International Airport with the unveiling of a new livery. The Boeing 737-800 aircraft, registered in Trinidad and Tobago, bore elements of Air Jamaica's original livery along with alterations to align the corporate identity with Caribbean Airlines. Each aircraft will bear a sticker of Caribbean Airlines logo along with both Jamaican and Trinbagonian national flags.

Air Jamaica ceased all operations in 2015.

== Destinations ==
=== Destinations in 1980 ===
According to the November 1, 1980 Air Jamaica system timetable, the airline was serving the following destinations:

North America

- Barbados
  - Bridgetown – Grantley Adams International Airport
- Bahamas
  - Nassau – Lynden Pindling International Airport
- Canada
  - Toronto – Toronto Pearson International Airport
- Cayman Islands
  - Grand Cayman – Owen Roberts International Airport
- Haiti
  - Port-au-Prince – Toussaint Louverture International Airport
- Jamaica
  - Kingston – Norman Manley International Airport (hub)
  - Montego Bay – Sangster International Airport (hub)
- Puerto Rico
  - San Juan – Luis Muñoz Marín International Airport
- United States
  - Chicago – Chicago O'Hare International Airport
  - Dallas – Dallas/Fort Worth International Airport
  - Houston – George Bush Intercontinental Airport
  - Miami – Miami International Airport
  - New York City – John F. Kennedy International Airport
  - Philadelphia – Philadelphia International Airport

Europe

- Germany
  - Frankfurt – Frankfurt Airport
- Switzerland
  - Zürich – Zurich Airport
- United Kingdom
  - London – Heathrow Airport
  - Manchester – Manchester Airport

The above referenced Air Jamaica system timetable states the airline was operating Boeing 727-200, Douglas DC-8 (both the standard DC-8 as well as the stretched Super DC-8) and McDonnell Douglas DC-9-30 jetliners at this time with all transatlantic flights being operated with DC-8 aircraft.

=== Destinations in 1999 ===
According to the October 1999 Air Jamaica route map, in the U.S. the airline had added Atlanta (ATL), Baltimore (BWI), Fort Lauderdale (FLL), Los Angeles (LAX), Newark (EWR) and Orlando (MCO) to its route network and was still serving Chicago (ORD), Miami (MIA), New York City (JFK), Philadelphia (PHL), Dallas (DFW) and Houston (IAH). This Air Jamaica route map also indicates the airline had discontinued service to Frankfurt (FRA) and Zurich (ZRH) in Europe but was still serving London Heathrow Airport (LHR). In Canada, Air Canada was operating code sharing flights on behalf of Air Jamaica on the Toronto (YYZ) routes. In the Caribbean, Air Jamaica had added service to Barbados (BGI), Bonaire (BON), Grenada (GND), Havana (HAV) and St. Lucia (UVF) and was continuing to serve Grand Cayman (GCM). This Air Jamaica route map also indicates the airline was operating a hub at Montego Bay (MBJ) in addition to its Kingston (KIN) service.

== See also ==
- Air Jamaica Express
