= TimAir =

Jamaican airline

| IATA | ICAO | Call sign |
|---|---|---|
| - | - | - |
- Founded: 1983
- Hubs: Sangster International Airport
- Fleet size: 7
- Destinations: 5 (charter)
- Headquarters: Montego Bay, Jamaica
- Key people: Fraser McConnell
- Website: http://www.timair.com/

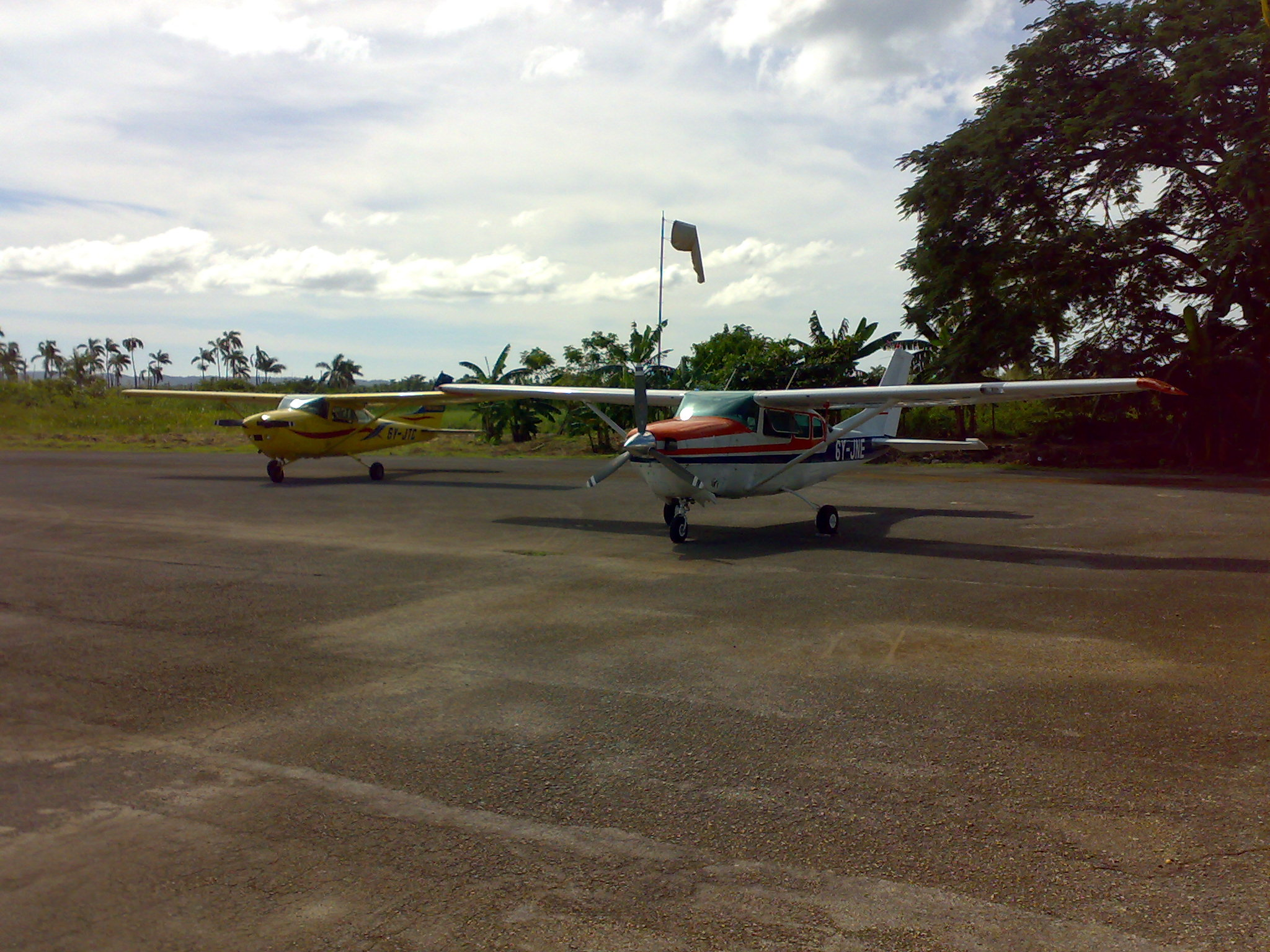
TimAir Cessna at Negril Aerodrome

TimAir is a charter airline based at the Sangster International Airport, Montego Bay, Jamaica.

== History ==
TimAir Limited was established in 1991 by Timothy Moxon as one of Jamaica's first "air taxi" services, providing air services for visitors to the island, as well as to the local business community. The airline was purchased in 1991 by Fraser McConnell.

== Fleet ==
- 6 Cessna 206 - 5 passengers
