= Negril Aerodrome =

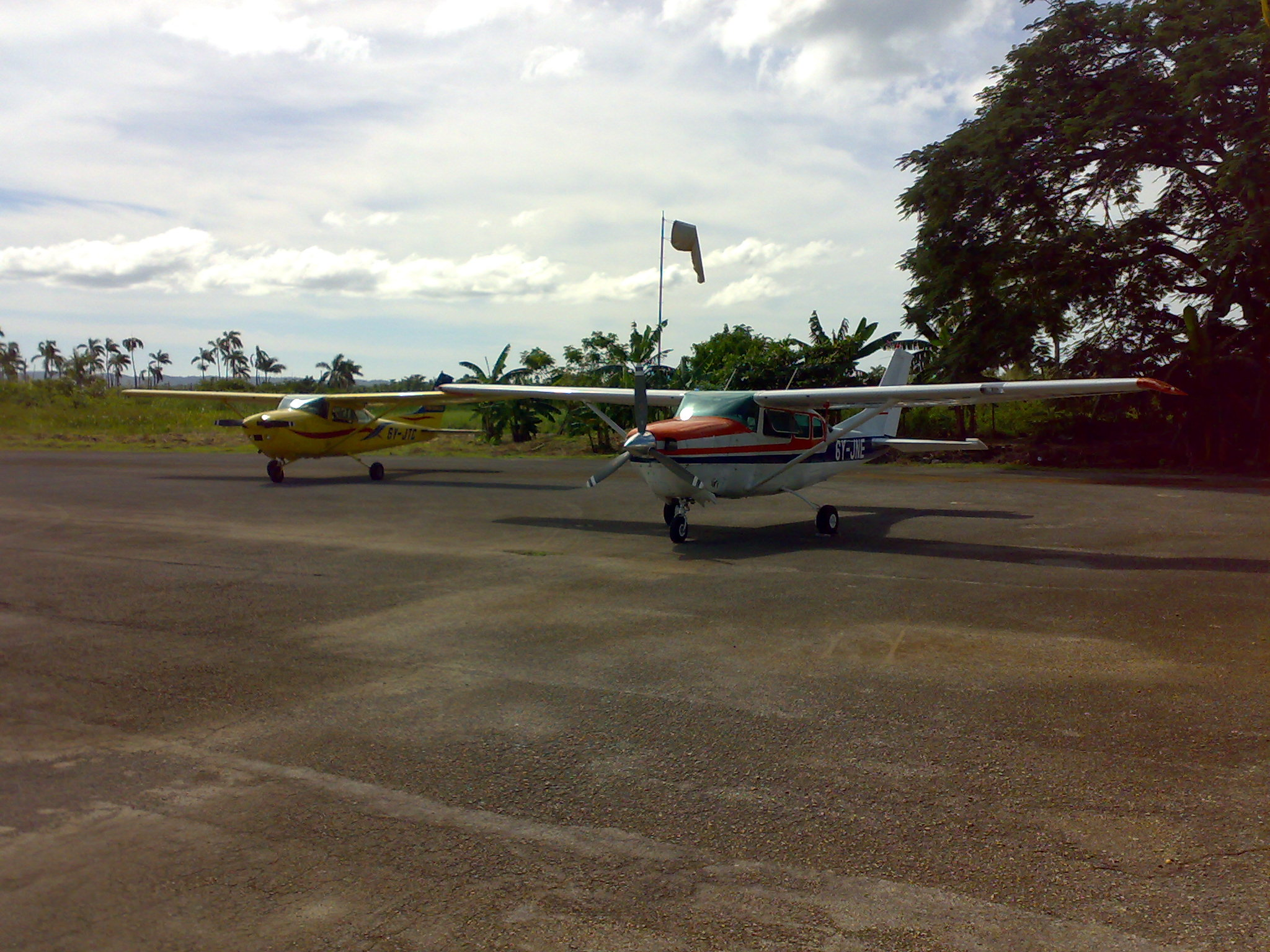
- IATA: NEG; ICAO: MKNG

Summary
- Airport type: Public
- Operator: Airports Authority of Jamaica
- Serves: Negril, Jamaica
- Elevation AMSL: 9 ft / 3 m
- Coordinates: 18°20′24″N 078°20′18″W

Map
- Location in Jamaica 18°20′24″N 078°20′08″W

Runways
Direction	Length		Surface
Direction	ft	m	Surface
05/23	2,200	671	Asphalt
- Sources: AAJ, GCM

Negril Aerodrome (IATA: NEG, ICAO: MKNG) is an airport serving Negril in western Jamaica. It is located 7 km (4.3 mi) north of Negril Point. It primarily serves the tourist resorts in the area. Negril Aerodrome handled approximately 72,096 passengers in 2001.

== Facilities ==
The airport resides at an elevation of 9 ft (3 m) above mean sea level. It has one runway designated 05/23 with an asphalt surface measuring 2,200 ft × 60 ft (671 m × 18 m). There are no fueling facilities and the airport has no night flight operations.

== Airlines and destinations ==
Airlines	Destinations
AirLink Express	Montego Bay

== Statistics ==
The following table shows the number of passengers using the airport annually from 1997 through 2001.

	1997	1998	1999	2000	2001
Passengers	31,646	42,030	65,926	57,809	72,096
