= Union Bank of Jamaica =

Bank of Jamaica

Union Bank of Jamaica in Jamaica was the result of a merger in 2000 of the business of four FINSAC controlled commercial banks and their three allied merchant banks, all seven of which sought Government intervention when faced with insolvency. The seven banks are:

- Citizens Bank
- Island Victoria Bank
- Eagle Commercial Bank
- Citizens Merchant Bank
- Workers Savings & Loan Bank
- Corporate Merchant Bank and
- Island Life Merchant Bank.

== History ==
Citizens Bank had started in 1967 as Jamaica Citizens Bank, the first Jamaican-owned bank. The US bank, Citizens and Southern had taken a 49% stake, and local interests owned 51%. At some point Citizens & Southern was forced to sell its shares to local interests. Eagle Commercial Bank had been established in 1968, and Island Victoria Bank in 1993.

In 2001, Royal Bank of Trinidad and Tobago bought Union Bank of Jamaica.
