= Clarien Bank =

Bermudan bank

Clarien Bank Limited
- Headquarters: Hamilton, Bermuda
- Area served: Bermuda
- Key people: Ian G. Truran (CEO)
- Products: Banking
- Website: https://clarienbank.com/

Clarien Bank Limited is one of four licensed banks in Bermuda. It was formerly known as Capital G Bank.

The bank is a subsidiary of Bermuda company CWH Limited which amalgamated with Capital G Bank in 2014 after which CWH became the majority shareholder.

Capital G Bank arose from the formation of Gibbons Deposit Company in 1974.

The chief executive is Ian G. Truran.
