= Butterfield Bank =

International bank based in Bermuda

Butterfield

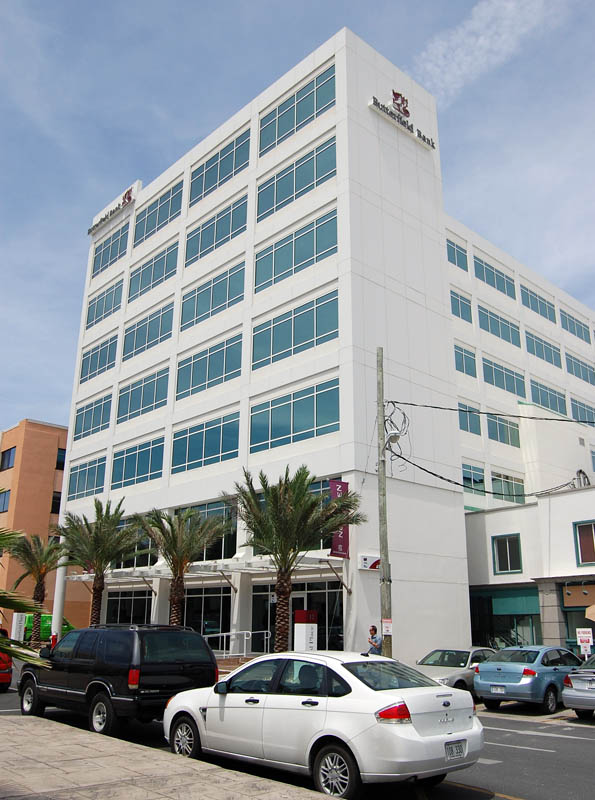
- Butterfield Bank in George Town, Grand Cayman
- Type: Public
- Traded as: BSX: NTB.BH; NYSE: NTB
- Industry: Financial Services
- Founded: 1858; 168 years ago
- Founder: Nathaniel T. Butterfield
- Headquarters: Hamilton, Bermuda
- Area served: Bahamas, Barbados, Bermuda, Cayman Islands, Guernsey, Jersey, Switzerland, Singapore, United Kingdom
- Products: Banking, Trust, Investments
- Revenue: ▲US$607 million (2025)
- Net income: ▲US$232 million (2025)
- Total assets: ▼US$14.1 billion (2025)
- Total equity: ▲US$1.14 billion (2025)
- Website: butterfieldgroup.com

Butterfield, officially The Bank of N. T. Butterfield & Son Limited, is a Bermudian financial services company founded in 1858 by Nathaniel T. Butterfield and headquartered in Bermuda. It provides services to clients from Bermuda, the Cayman Islands, Guernsey and Jersey, where its principal banking operations are located, and The Bahamas, Barbados, (until they pulled out and were replaced by First Citizens Bank), Switzerland, Singapore and the United Kingdom, where it offers specialized financial services. Banking services comprise deposit, cash management and lending for individual, business and institutional clients. Wealth management services are composed of trust, private banking, asset management and custody. In Bermuda, the Cayman Islands and Guernsey, Butterfield offers both banking and wealth management. In The Bahamas, Singapore and Switzerland, Butterfield offers select wealth management services. In the UK, Butterfield offers residential property lending. In Jersey, it offers banking and wealth management services. Butterfield is publicly traded on the New York Stock Exchange (symbol: NTB) and the Bermuda Stock Exchange (symbol: NTB.BH).

On May 28, 2026, it was announced that Butterfield Bank will acquire CIBC Caribbean for US$1.8 billion through cash and stock consideration, with anticipated closing in the first half of 2027.

== History ==
In 1858 the Bank of N. T. Butterfield was founded as Bermuda's first bank. Butterfield was incorporated by an Act of Parliament in Bermuda in 1904. In 1923, Butterfield moved to its current headquarters on Front Street in the City of Hamilton.

In 1941, during World War II, the bank opened a branch in St. George's, Bermuda, to serve military personnel. Following the war the bank experienced rapid growth, increasing its number of shareholders by 42% and becoming the largest Bermuda company in terms of shareholders. During the 1960s, the bank opened branches in the United Kingdom and the Cayman Islands and formed new companies to handle mortgages and trusts, followed by its third Bermuda branch, in Somerset, Bermuda, in 1970. During the 1980s the bank took over the Bermuda National Bank, expanded its overseas business and introduced automated teller machines (ATMs) into Bermuda. In 2004, the bank acquired City of London merchant bank Leopold Joseph, This purchase also included Leopold Joseph Guernsey Limited.

In March 2010, Butterfield Group posted a US$213 million loss, and announced that CIBC, the Carlyle Group and other institutional investors had collectively purchased a majority stake in the bank through a capital injection of US$550 million.

It was also announced at that time that CEO & President Alan Thompson had stepped down from leadership of the company, with then-CFO Brad Kopp assuming the role of President and CEO.

Butterfield returned to profitability in 2011, posting net income for the year of US$40.5 million.

In 2012, Brendan McDonagh, who was previously chief executive officer of HSBC North America Holdings and group managing director, HSBC Holdings plc, joined Butterfield as a director and executive chairman. In August 2012, McDonagh was named chairman and chief executive officer.

In 2014, Butterfield acquired the trust and fiduciary services business of Guernsey-based Legis Group, adding further scale to its international trust business. In 2015, Butterfield completed the acquisition of select personal and corporate banking business from HSBC in the Cayman Islands, similarly expanding its market presence in that market.

On April 30, 2015, Butterfield repurchased and cancelled the majority of CIBC's shareholding in the Bank, with other shareholders taking up CIBC's remaining shares, and CIBC ceased to be a Butterfield shareholder.

In September 2015, Michael Collins, who was previously Senior Executive Vice President, was named Butterfield's chief executive officer, and Brendan McDonagh, former CEO, became the bank's executive chairman. McDonagh retired from the bank and board in October 2015, at which time Barclay Simmons, previously vice chairman, became chairman of the board.

In September 2016, Butterfield became listed on the New York Stock Exchange through a successful $287.5 million initial public offering in the US. Following the listing, the Carlyle Group divested its holdings of Butterfield shares, and the Bank today is held widely by US institutional investors and individual shareholders.

Barclay Simmons retired as chairman in 2017, and Michael Collins became chairman of the board in addition to his responsibilities as chief executive officer.

In 2018, Butterfield acquired from Deutsche Bank both its Global Trust Solutions business, which resulted in the addition of a Singapore trust company and a Mauritius-based support centre to the Butterfield network, and its Channel Islands Banking business, which resulted in Butterfield obtaining a full banking license in Jersey; the first bank to do so in a dozen years.

In April 2019 Butterfield bought the private banking activities of ABN AMRO on the Channel Islands

In August 2021 it was announced that Butterfield would transfer its banking operations in Mauritius to Guernsey.

=== Acquisition of CIBC Caribbean (2026) ===
On May 28, 2026, Butterfield and CIBC Caribbean jointly announced that the two parties have entered into a definite agreement for Butterfield Bank to acquire CIBC’s 91.7% interest in CIBC Caribbean Bank Limited for US$1.8 billion (US$1.1 billion in cash and US$703 million in Butterfield shares). Upon transaction closing in the first half of 2027, CIBC will retain 22% stake in the combined company and Butterfield will commence a mandatory take-over bid for the remaining 8.3% of total outstanding shares of CIBC Caribbean held by minority shareholders, with the objective of acquiring full ownership of CIBC Caribbean.

The combined entity under Butterfield Bank will create a large financial institution with US$29 billion in total assets, US$25 billion in total deposits, and market share in various Caribbean entities including Cayman Islands, Bermuda, Barbados, The Bahamas, and Turks and Caicos Islands.

Barclays served as lead financial advisor to Butterfield and CIBC Capital Markets served as financial advisor to CIBC Caribbean.
