= Boscobel, Jamaica =

Human settlement in Jamaica

Coordinates: 18°24′N 76°58′W

Boscobel is located in St. Mary Parish on the north shore of Jamaica, ten miles east of Ocho Rios. It is home to Ian Fleming International Airport and is located approximately halfway between Montego Bay and Kingston.
