= Ian Fleming International Airport =

- IATA: OCJ; ICAO: MKBS

Summary
- Airport type: Public
- Operator: Airports Authority of Jamaica
- Serves: Ocho Rios, Jamaica
- Location: Boscobel, Saint Mary Parish, Jamaica
- Elevation AMSL: 90 ft / 27 m
- Coordinates: 18°24′15″N 076°58′08″W
- Website: ifia.aero

Map
- Location in Jamaica

Runways
Direction	Length		Surface
Direction	ft	m	Surface
09/27	4,769	1,454	Asphalt
- Sources: AAJ, DAFIF

Ian Fleming International Airport (IFIA) (previously Boscobel Aerodrome) (also known as Ocho Rios - Boscobel Airport) (IATA: OCJ, ICAO: MKBS) is an international airport located in Boscobel, Saint Mary Parish, Jamaica, 10 km (6.2 mi) east of Ocho Rios, in northeastern Jamaica. The airport historically provided service to the United States and to other Caribbean islands. It is named for Ian Fleming, the creator of the James Bond novels, whose Goldeneye estate is located in St. Mary parish.

== History ==
Previously known as Boscobel Aerodrome, the airport was originally a limited service facility that processed about 20,000 passengers annually. Boscobel Aerodrome was in operation for over 30 years and had scheduled passenger service provided by local air carriers such as Air Jamaica Express, Jamaica Air Service, Jamaica Air Shuttle and Trans Jamaican Airlines which flew small prop and turboprop aircraft such as the Beechcraft 99, Britten-Norman Trislander, de Havilland Heron, and Dornier 228.

Renovations began in early 2009, and the total cost of construction was $300 million (JMD). The new airport was opened on 12 January 2011 by Prime Minister Bruce Golding, who said that the intention of the airport was to handle small jets, international arrivals and to attract the high-end tourism market to Jamaica's north coast, including Ocho Rios, Oracabessa, and Port Antonio. Also present for the opening was Ian Fleming's niece, Lucy Fleming, and Goldeneye's current owner, Chris Blackwell.

The new airport welcomed its first international flight on 7 May 2010 (eight months prior to its official opening) when a single-engine Pilatus PC-12 turboprop flew in from the Bahamas with singer-songwriter and businessman Jimmy Buffett, of "Margaritaville" fame, being the first international passenger to be processed by customs and immigration officers at the facility.

The renaming of the airport was controversial, with some locals feeling that a prominent Jamaican should have been honoured in preference to the British Ian Fleming. Prime Minister Golding acknowledged the controversy in his remarks at the opening of the airport. He explained that Ian Fleming gave Jamaica "an image much larger than it would otherwise have had", and that this was the place where the creativity emerged that enabled him to write 13 James Bond novels, and to become one of the world's most famous authors.

On 31 March 2022, American Airlines announced that it would begin non-stop flights from Miami to the airport on 5 November 2022, under its American Eagle regional brand. The flights, designated Flight 4007, mark the first by a US airline to the airport. However, the route was postponed until further notice due to American's request that additional Air Navigation Aids be provided at the airport. In October 2023, American announced that flights would begin to the airport on 24 February 2024.

== Facilities ==
The Ian Fleming International Airport is at an elevation of 90 ft (27 m) above mean sea level. It has one runway designated 09/27 with an asphalt surface measuring 4,769 ft × 79 ft (1,454 m × 24 m). The airport is designed to handle private and commercial aircraft as large as the Cessna Citation Excel. The airport features a modern terminal, landing lights, fire truck garage and a fuelling station. Passenger amenities include customs and immigration services, a passenger lounge, and pilot briefing rooms.

== Airlines and destinations ==
Airlines	Destinations
American Eagle	Miami
InterCaribbean Airways	Providenciales

== Statistics ==
The following table shows the number of passengers using the airport annually from 1997 through 2001.

	1997	1998	1999	2000	2001
Passengers	11,539	15,944	23,638	23,483	22,410
