= Jamaica Stock Exchange =

Jamaican stock market index

- Type: Stock exchange
- Location: Kingston, Jamaica
- Founded: 1968
- Key people: Marlene Street Forrest (MD); Ian McNaughton (Chairman)
- Currency: Jamaican dollar
- No. of listings: 120
- Market cap: US$15.96 Billion
- Indices: JSE (Main) Index; JSE All Jamaican Composite Index; JSE Select Index; JSE Cross Listed Index; JSE Junior Market Index; JSE Combined Index; JSE USD Equities Index
- Website: www.jamstockex.com

The Jamaica Stock Exchange is the principal stock exchange of Jamaica, also known as JSE. Incorporated in 1968, JSE opened in 1969 in Kingston, Jamaica. Today, the JSE is one of the largest stock exchanges in the Caribbean by size and market capitalization. As of 30 September 2019, there is a total number of 85 companies and 120 securities listed to the JSE, and a market capitalization of just over JM$2 trillion. The Jamaica Stock Exchange is composed of multiple markets: Main Market, Junior Market, USD Market, and Bond Market. The JSE is also recognized as one of the most sector-diverse exchanges in the Caribbean. The key sectors include banking and finance, retail, manufacturing, insurance, leisure, communications, conglomerate, and services and real estate. The current chairman is Ian McNaughton and the deputy chairman is Gary Peart. The managing director is Marlene Street Forrest.

== Vision ==
The JSE's aim is to the facilitate growth and development of companies and the economy in Jamaica by allowing for "the mobilization, exchange and expansion of capital while providing a return on equity that is acceptable to our shareholders."

== History ==
The four founding members were Willard Samms of Annett & Company Limited, Raglan S. Golding of Capital Market Services (Ja) Ltd, Edward E Gayle of Edward Gayle & Company Ltd, and Anthony Lloyd of Pitfield Mckay Ross & Co Ltd.

The market was initially known as the "Kingston Stock Exchange". It started trading operations on Monday, 3 February 1969. It was restricted to brokers who traded both as agents and as principals.

In 1989, the JSE opened a subsidiary, the Jamaica Central Securities Depository (JCSD) to facilitate electronic transfer and settlement of securities. Services later expanded to include registrar, transfer and paying agency.

In 2008, JCSD founded a subsidiary, JCSD Trustee Services Limited, to provide trustee services.

On 3 June 2008, JSE demutualized and listed on its own Exchange.

On 14 October 2014, JSE became the 16th announced member of the United Nations Sustainable Stock Exchanges initiative.

On 7 May 2015, JSE launched its new online trading platform.

On 18 January 2019, JSE was named the world's top-performing stock exchange by Bloomberg Businessweek.

On 11 December 2019, it became public knowledge that the JSE had partnered with Toronto-based FinTech Blockstation to enable the issuance of digital assets including Security Token Offerings (STOs)/Tokenized IPOs, with Trinidad-based e-commerce platform WiPay planning to be of the first to take advantage in 2020.

In December 2019, JSE advised that they had successfully migrated to Nasdaq's trading (Nasdaq Matching Engine) and surveillance (Nasdaq Market Surveillance) platforms.

== Market index data ==
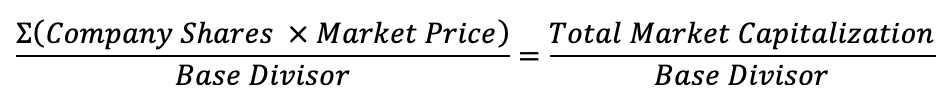
The formula used by the JSE to compute the listed indices. The formula shows the relationship between prices and total market capitalization and how that causes the index to increase and decrease.

There are currently seven market indices that are maintained by the JSE:

- JSE (Main) Index - Measures the performance of all ordinary shares that are listed on the Main Market.
- JSE All Jamaican Composite Index - Measures the performance of all ordinary shares for Jamaican companies that are listed on the Main Market.
- JSE Select Index - Measures the performance of the 15 most liquid ordinary shares listed on the Main Market and the Junior Market.
- JSE Cross Listed Index - Measures the performance of all ordinary shares of foreign companies that are listed on the Main Market.
- JSE Junior Market Index - Measures the performance of all ordinary shares that are listed on the Junior Market.
- JSE Combined Index - Measures the performance of all ordinary shares that are listed on the Main Market and the Junior Market.
- JSE USD Equities Index - Measures the performance of all ordinary shares that are listed on the US Dollar Equities Market.

== See also ==
- List of stock exchanges
- List of stock exchanges in the Americas
- List of stock exchanges in the Commonwealth of Nations
