= Sangster International Airport =

International airport in Jamaica

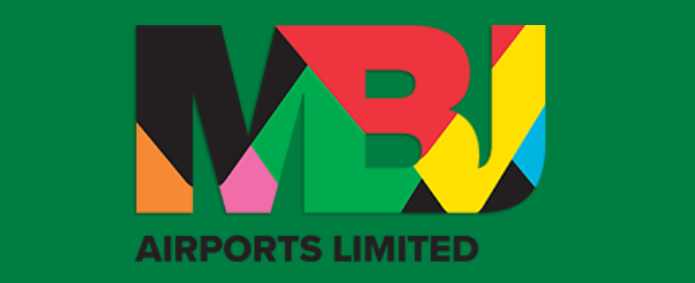

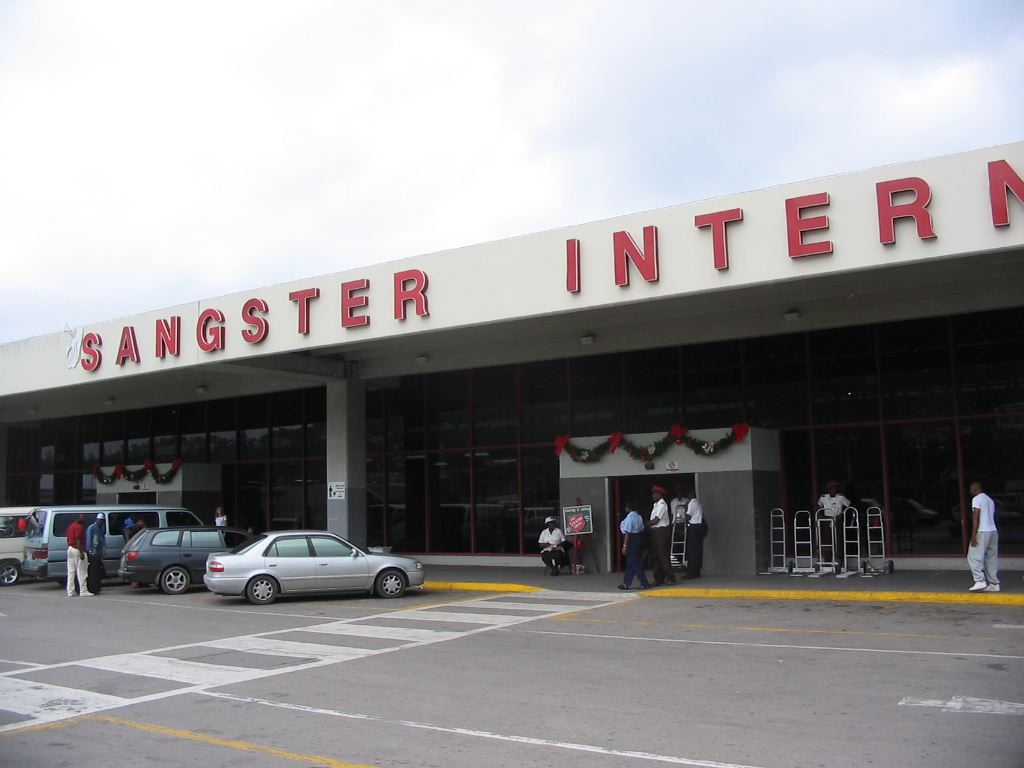
- The front of Sangster International Airport's passenger terminal in 2004
- IATA: MBJ; ICAO: MKJS

Summary
- Airport type: Public
- Owner: Airports Authority of Jamaica
- Operator: MBJ Airports Limited
- Serves: Montego Bay, Jamaica
- Built: 1947
- Elevation AMSL: 4 ft (1.2 m)
- Coordinates: 18°30′13″N 77°54′48″W
- Website: mbjairport.com

Map
- Location in Jamaica

Runways
Direction	Length		Surface
Direction	m	ft	Surface
07/25	3,060	10,039	Asphalt

Statistics (2025)
- Total passengers: 4,495,370
- Aircraft operations: 37,528
- Source: Sangster International Airport

Sangster International Airport (IATA: MBJ, ICAO: MKJS) – also known as Montego Bay International Airport or simply Montego Bay Airport – is an international airport located three miles (4.8 km) east of Montego Bay, Jamaica. The airport is capable of handling nine million passengers per year. It serves as the most popular airport for tourists visiting the north coast of Jamaica. The airport is named after former Jamaican Prime Minister Sir Donald Sangster.

The airport is run by the management company, MBJ Airports Limited, whose leading stakeholder is Grupo Aeroportuario del Pacífico, and minority-owned by Vantage Airport Group. Sangster was privatised and turned over by Airports Authority of Jamaica to the consortium in 2003. A 2021 study found that Sangster International Airport was one of the 20 most vulnerable international airports to climate change-caused sea level rise.

== History ==
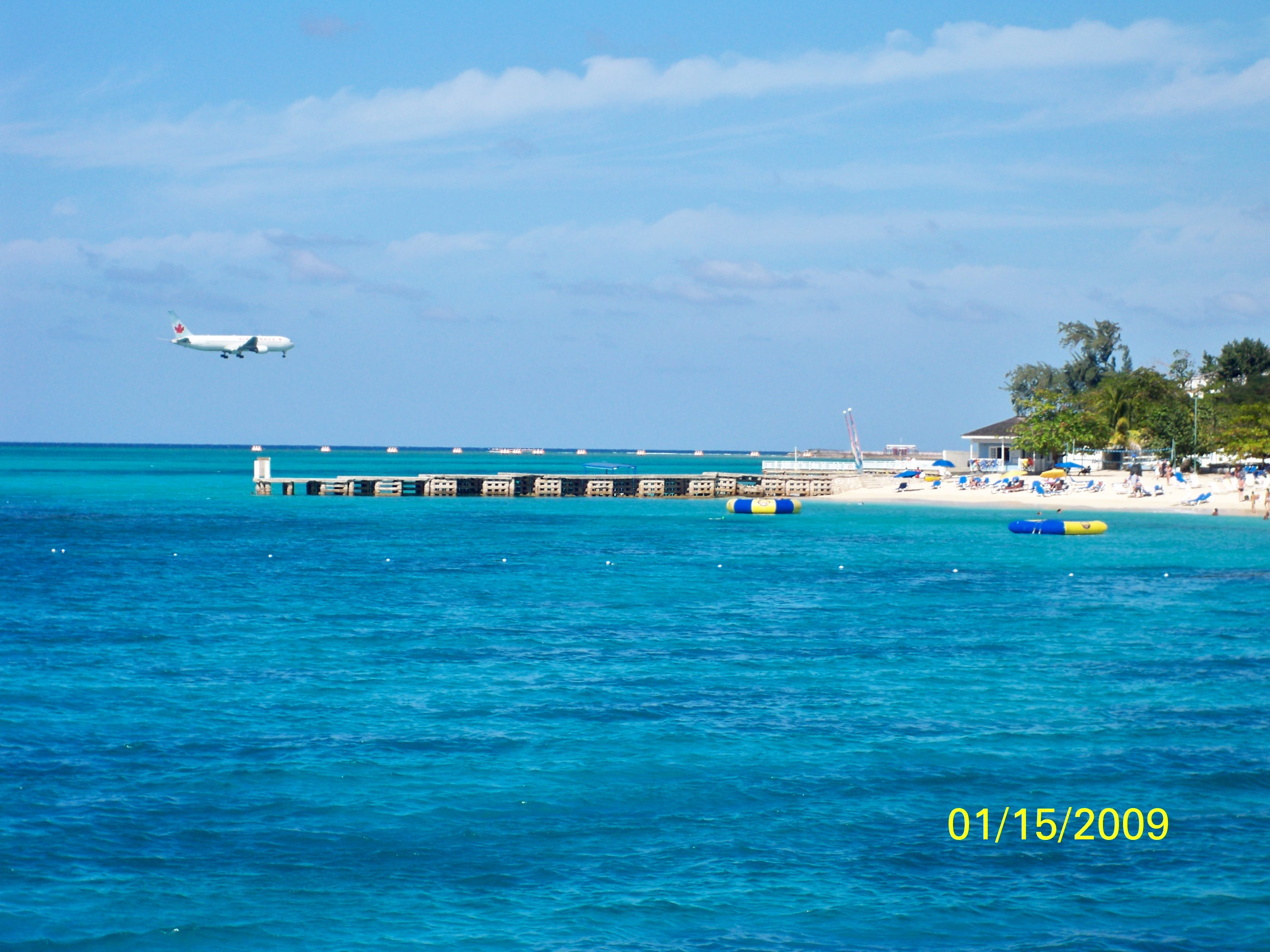
An Air Canada aircraft landing at Sangster International Airport in 2009

Sangster International Airport in Montego Bay, St. James, was first conceived in 1936 when the site now housing the Sangster International Airport was identified as one suitable for the construction of an airport in the town of Montego Bay. Originally named the Montego Bay Airport, a decision was made to build the runway in 1940, and the actual construction of the facility was completed on 18 February 1947. At the time of its completion, the town of Montego Bay was more like a playground for the rich and famous, and was then considered one of the premier vacation spots within the Caribbean, just as it is today.

The first international airline to fly into the Montego Bay Airport was Pan American Airways (which eventually became Pan Am), and the airport, which in comparison to today's standards was more like a small aerodrome, was operated by Pan American until 30 September 1949, when the Jamaican government took control of the facility. However, the Sangster International Airport, as it is known today, is nothing like it was in the early days. One of the most noticeable differences was that initially, the terminal building was on the northern side of the runway but was shifted to the southern side of the runway during one of the several upgrading exercises that took place at that facility, which was necessitated by the growth in air traffic over the years. Plans for the construction of a new terminal at its present location, on the southern side of the runway, were announced in July 1955. The plans for the new terminal building was part of what turned out to be a continued upgrading and restructuring of the facility, to enable it to cope with the growth in traffic. The original terminal was built and opened on 7 July 1959, with a capacity to accommodate 500 passengers per hour, and parking for seven aircraft at a time.

=== Divestment and expansion ===
Over the years, the upgrading process was a continuous one, ultimately the facility had grown into the larger of the three international airports in Jamaica, handling approximately 3.7 million passengers per annum in 2007, and had seen an increase in passenger and aircraft movement in 2009. The management and partners of the airport have been trying to seek passengers from Asia, but the project stalled in 2010.

Since January 2001, plans have been executed to expand the airport to the status of a world-class airport. The new eastern concourse of the Sangster International Airport (SIA) (the result of phases 1A and 1B) was officially opened in December 2005. Phase two was then due to begin towards the end of 2006; however because the economic conditions were favourable and the tourist trade in Jamaica is increasing, phase two was brought forward to January 2006.

A planned expansion of the main runway was in a preparation phase, but due to poor economic conditions, the runway expansion project was stopped indefinitely in 2012. This expansion would have afforded the airport a fully functioning 10,000-foot (3,000 m) runway to accommodate large aircraft. MBJ Airports Limited also commissioned a new customs hall, arrivals lobby and transportation centre in March 2007. Since then, further expansion and renovation projects such as the relocation of the immigration hall and duty-free mall have been launched and were completed in September 2008. This increased the handling capacity to nine million passengers per annum. Plans are also in place for the relocation of the tower and the domestic terminal.

In 2006, there was a change in management at the airport following the change in the consortium that operates this facility. Relations between the new management and unions have been difficult, with strikes in November 2007 and in November 2009.

The airport won the World Travel Awards' "Caribbean's Leading Airport" for the years 2005, and 2009 to 2017.

=== Current and future expansion ===
Due to recent surges in passenger numbers and new routes being added, the airport consortium has taken on a number of projects to rehabilitate the airport in order to cope with the added demand. The airport will be renovating its check-in area which had been left untouched since 2008, as well as re-surfacing aprons, taxiway, and the runway. The airport also revamped its duty-free offerings and, in March 2018, welcomed three Starbucks outlets (part of Starbucks' first foray in the Jamaican market), complementing the already well-appointed airside offerings like Auntie Anne's, Quiznos, Nathan's, Dairy Queen, Moe's Southwest Grill and Wendy's. In March 2018, the airport announced its plan to revamp the airport's retail area to enhance the customer experience and optimize profits on retailing activities in the airport.

In October 2025, the airport sustained significant damage from Hurricane Melissa – the worst out of the nation's three international airports. The storm destroyed large portions of the passenger terminal, ripping sections of its roof off, and caused extensive flooding. By October 30, the airport reopened for relief flights, with all passenger flights remaining suspended.

== Airlines and destinations ==
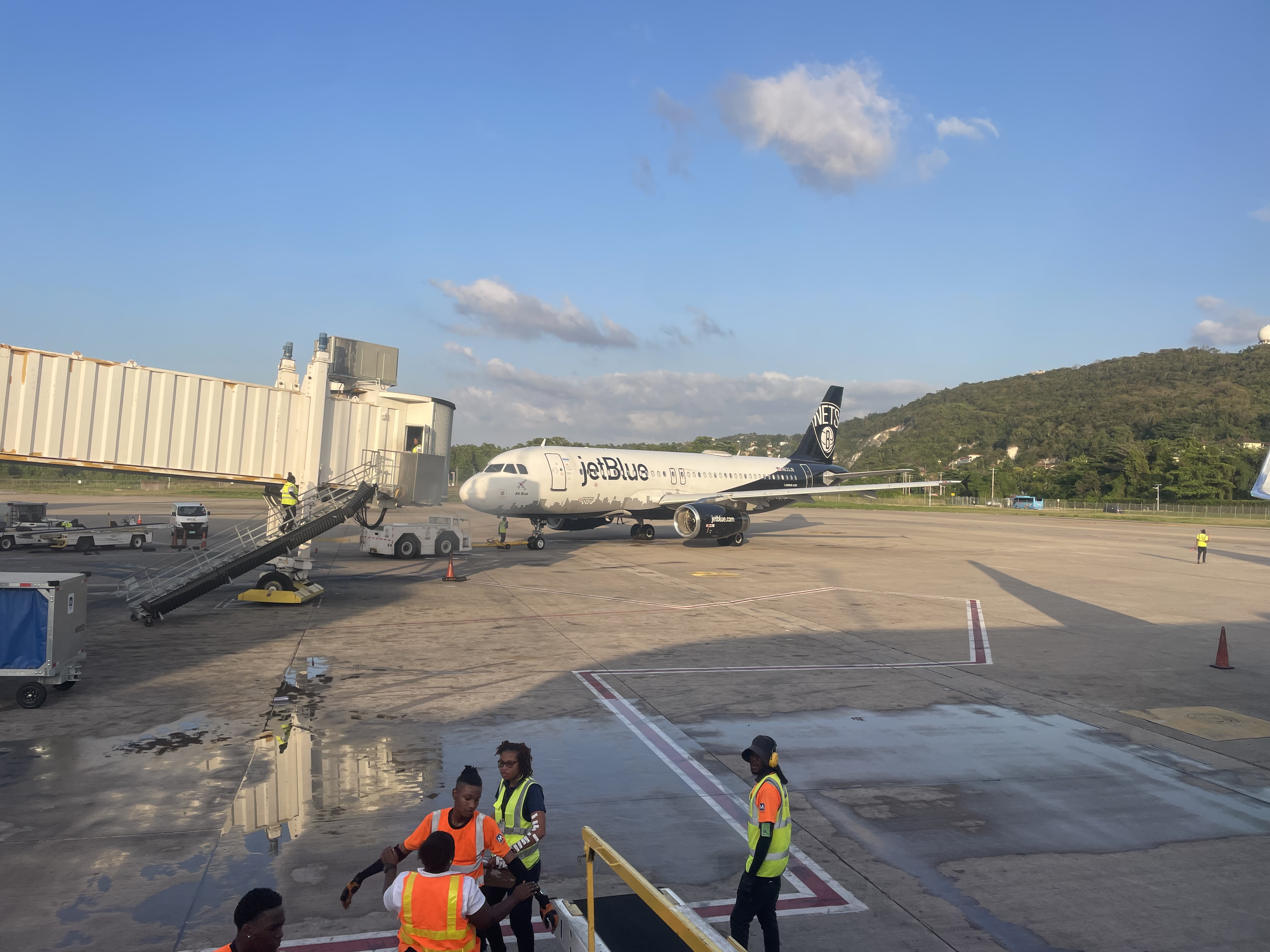
A JetBlue Airbus A320-200 on the airport's tarmac in 2024

=== Passenger ===
Airlines	Destinations
Aeroméxico	Mexico City–Benito Juárez (begins March 18, 2027)
Air Canada	Toronto–Pearson; Seasonal: Halifax (resumes December 3, 2026), Montréal–Trudeau, Ottawa (resumes December 6, 2026)
Air Canada Rouge	Seasonal: Edmonton (begins 13 December 2026), Winnipeg (begins 14 December 2026)
Air Transat	Montréal–Trudeau, Toronto–Pearson; Seasonal: Halifax
American Airlines	Charlotte, Chicago–O'Hare, Dallas/Fort Worth, Miami, New York–JFK, Philadelphia; Seasonal: Boston
Bahamasair	Seasonal: Nassau
Breeze Airways	Tampa (begins 19 December 2026)
Cayman Airways	Seasonal: Grand Cayman
Condor	Seasonal: Frankfurt
Copa Airlines	Panama City–Tocumen
Delta Air Lines	Atlanta, New York–JFK, Seasonal: Boston, Detroit, Minneapolis/St. Paul
Edelweiss Air	Seasonal: Zurich
Flair Airlines	Seasonal: Toronto–Pearson
Frontier Airlines	Atlanta; Seasonal: Philadelphia
InterCaribbean Airways	Kingston–Norman Manley
International AirLink	Negril
JetBlue	Boston, Fort Lauderdale, New York–JFK, Orlando
LATAM Peru	Lima
Liat Air	Kingston–Norman Manley
Neos	Seasonal: Milan–Malpensa, Verona
Porter Airlines	Seasonal: Hamilton (ON) (begins 20 December 2026), London (ON) (begins 18 December 2026), Ottawa (begins 25 November 2026), Toronto–Pearson (begins 23 November 2026)
Southwest Airlines	Baltimore, Chicago–Midway, Fort Lauderdale, Houston–Hobby, Nashville, Orlando; Seasonal: Kansas City, St. Louis
Sun Country Airlines	Seasonal: Minneapolis/St. Paul
TUI Airways	Birmingham, London–Gatwick, Manchester (UK); Seasonal: Glasgow
TUI fly Netherlands	Amsterdam
United Airlines	Chicago–O'Hare, Denver, Houston–Intercontinental, Newark, Washington–Dulles
Virgin Atlantic	London–Heathrow
WestJet	Montréal–Trudeau, Toronto–Pearson; Seasonal: Calgary, Edmonton, London (ON), Québec City, Winnipeg
Wingo	Bogotá, Medellín–JMC
World2fly	Seasonal: Lisbon

== Statistics ==
Traffic figures at Sangster International Airport
Year	Passengers	Change	Aircraft movements	Change
2014	3,633,998	-	40,764	-
2015	3,800,608	▲4.6%	41,338	▲1.4%
2016	3,952,273	▲4.0%	40,823	▼1.2%
2017	4,284,558	▲8.4%	41,263	▲1.1%
2018	4,537,585	▲5.9%	41,005	▼0.6%
2019	4,766,301	▲5.0%	42,283	▲3.1%
2020	1,624,827	▼65.9%	19,357	▼54.2%
2021	2,589,259	▲59.4%	28,391	▲46.7%
2022	4,404,134	▲70.1%	37,957	▲33.7%
2023	5,267,823	▲19.61%	44,482	▲17.19%
2024	5,105,417	▼3.08%	42,228	▼5.07%
2025	4,495,370	▼11.95%	37,528	▼11.13%

== Accidents and incidents ==
- On 21 January 1960, Avianca Flight 671, a Lockheed L-1049E Super Constellation, crashed and burned on landing, killing 37 of the 46 passengers and crew aboard.
- On 19 April 2009, CanJet Flight 918, a Boeing 737-800, that was bound for Halifax Stanfield International Airport (YHZ), Halifax, Canada, was hijacked before takeoff. The hijacker, armed with a semi-automatic pistol, reportedly asked to be taken to Cuba. However, the security personnel eventually regained control of the aircraft without anyone being injured.

== See also ==
- List of the busiest airports in the Caribbean
