= List of shipwrecks of North America =

This is a list of shipwrecks located in or around North America, within the territorial waters of countries which for political purposes are considered a part of the North American continent, including Canada, the United States, Mexico, Central America, and the island nations of the Caribbean.

== Bermuda ==
| Ship | Flag | Sunk date | Notes | Coordinates |
|---|---|---|---|---|
| Alert | | March 1877 | A fishing sloop that was wrecked on the northern reefs. | |
| Apollo | | February 1890 | A schooner that was wrecked on the reefs en route to Nova Scotia. | |
| Avenger | | February 1894 | A brigantine that was wrecked on Mills Breakers. | |
| Beaumaris Castle | | 25 April 1873 | A cargo ship that ran aground on Mills Breakers and was abandoned after several unsuccessful salvage attempts. | |
| Blanch King | | 2 December 1920 | A schooner that was wrecked on the southwest reefs. | |
| Caesar | | 17 May 1818 | A brig that was wrecked on a reef en route from England to Baltimore. | |
| Caraquet | | 25 June 1923 | A mail steamship that was wrecked on the northern barrier reef. | |
| HMS Cerberus | Royal Navy | 21 February 1783 | A fifth-rate warship that was lost at Castle Harbour. | |
| Collector | | 26 May 1823 | A schooner that was wrecked northeast of St. George's. | |
| Colonel William G. Ball | | June 1943 | A luxury yacht that was wrecked on Mills Breakers in severe weather. | |
| Constellation | | 30 July 1942 | A schooner that was wrecked on a reef with a cargo of drugs, cement, and whiskey, an incident which inspired the novel and film The Deep. | |
| Cristobal Colon | | 25 October 1936 | An ocean liner that ran aground on a reef, becoming Bermuda's largest shipwreck. | |
| Curlew | | 17 March 1856 | A barquentine that was wrecked on the northern reefs. | |
| Darlington | | 22 February 1886 | A steamship that was wrecked on the Western Reef. | |
| Eagle | | 12 January 1659 | A merchantman that was wrecked on the northeast breakers. | |
| Elda | | 20 June 1956 | A yacht that was wrecked close to the Eagle. | |
| "Frenchman wreck" | | c. 1750 | An unidentified ship, wrecked around 1750; found in 1983. | |
| Hermes | United States | 1984 | An American ship that was scuttled as a dive wreck one mile off shore. | |
| L'Herminie | | 3 December 1838 | A frigate that was wrecked on a reef in rough weather. | |
| Hunters Galley | | 11 January 1752 | A sloop that foundered in a series of storms and was wrecked on the rocks at Hogfish Cut. | |
| Iristo | Norway | 16 March 1937 | A Norwegian steamer also known as Aristo, that grounded after mistaking the Colon wreck for a ship still underway. She was recovered from the reef, but sank under tow the following day. | |
| Kate | United Kingdom | 30 November 1878 | A British steamer that struck a reef and was run aground to prevent her from sinking. | |
| HMS Katherine | Royal Navy | 4 April 1763 | A brigantine that was wrecked en route to Jamaica. | |
| King | United States | 1984 | An American tug that was scuttled as the first intentionally created dive site in Bermuda. | |
| Lartington | | 14 December 1879 | A cargo ship that ran aground near Western Blue Cut, after just five years of operation. | |
| Lord Amherst | United Kingdom | 16 February 1778 | A British armed transport and hospital ship that was wrecked on the western reefs. | |
| Madiana | | 10 February 1903 | A passenger steamer, formerly the Balmoral Castle, that struck a reef near Hamilton Harbour. | |
| "Manilla wreck" | | | An unidentified ship, wrecked mid-18th century. | |
| Mari Celeste | United States | 13 September 1864 | An American Civil War blockade runner that struck a reef while being piloted by a Bermudian, and sank within eight minutes. | |
| Mark Antonio | Spain | 18 July 1777 | A Spanish privateer that was wrecked on the reefs, and discovered in the early 1960s. | |
| Minnie Breslauer | | 1 January 1873 | A cargo ship that ran aground on the reefs, and although later recovered, sank en route to St. George's. | |
| Montana | United Kingdom | 30 December 1863 | An American Civil War blockade runner that hit a reef off the north shore. | 32°21.817′N 64°54.812′W |
| Mussel | Bermuda | 7 February 1926 | A Bermudian fishing ketch that was wrecked on the western reefs. | |
| North Carolina | | 1 January 1880 | A barque that was wrecked south of Gibs Hill Lighthouse. | |
| Pelinaion | Greece | 22 December 1940 | A Greek steamer that was wrecked off David's Head. | |
| Pollockshields | | 1915 | A cargo ship, formerly the Herodot, that was wrecked near Elbow Beach. | |
| Ramona | Canada | | A Canadian yacht that was wrecked in 1967, refloated for salvaging, and re-sunk near the Royal Naval Dockyard. | |
| Richard P. Buck | | 13 April 1889 | A cargo ship that caught fire and sank following a storm. | |
| San Antonio | Kingdom of Portugal | 12 September 1621 | A Portuguese nao that was wrecked on the west reefs, and discovered in 1960. | |
| San Pedro | Spain | 1595–1596 | A 350-ton Spanish ship that was wrecked to the north of the main island, and discovered in 1951. Valuable treasures and artifacts have been raised, including a 32-ounce gold bar, two smaller gold bars, and an emerald-studded gold cross. | |
| Sea Venture | England | 25 July 1609 | An English ship that was deliberately grounded after taking damage in a storm, and subsequently broke up and sank. | |
| Taunton | Norway | 24 November 1920 | A Norwegian steamer that was wrecked on the northern reefs. | |
| Virginia Merchant | | 26 March 1661 | A passenger and cargo ship that ran aground off Sonesta Beach. | |
| HMS Vixen | Royal Navy | 1896 | A coastal defence ship that was scuttled as a blockship off Daniel's Head. | 32°18′21.31″N 64°53′7.88″W |
| Warwick | England | November 1619 | An English cargo ship that was sunk in a gale in Castle Harbour. | |
| Wychwood | United Kingdom | 14 August 1955 | An English steamer that ran aground off Gibs Hill Light. The ship was refloated but then abandoned at Five Fathom's Hole, and later blown up as a hazard to navigation. | |
| Zovetto | | 13 February 1924 | A cargo ship, also known as Zovetta or Rita Zovetto, that ran aground off St. David's Light. | |

== Cuba ==
| Ship | Flag | Sunk date | Notes | Coordinates |
|---|---|---|---|---|
| Almirante Oquendo | Spanish Navy | 3 July 1898 | An Infanta Maria Teresa-class armored cruiser that was scuttled about 700 metres (2,300 ft) offshore in the Battle of Santiago de Cuba. | 19°58′39″N 76°8′40″W |
| Cristóbal Colón | Spanish Navy | 3 July 1898 | A Giuseppe Garibaldi-class armored cruiser that was sunk in the Battle of Santiago de Cuba. | 19°56′N 76°45′W |
| USS Merrimac | United States Navy | 2 June 1898 | A steamship that was sunk by Spanish cruisers in the harbor at Santiago de Cuba. | 19°58′37″N 75°52′18″W |
| Vizcaya | Spanish Navy | 3 July 1898 | An Infanta Maria Teresa-class armored cruiser that was sunk in the Battle of Santiago de Cuba. | 19°58′N 76°8′W |

== Dominican Republic ==
| Ship | Flag | Sunk date | Notes | Coordinates |
|---|---|---|---|---|
| Astron | Soviet Union | 7 April 1978 | A freighter that ran aground and broke in two off the coast of Punta Cana. | 18°43′49.79″N 68°27′14.27″W |
| Atlantic Princess | | | Originally a tourist mover that was to be sunk as an artificial reef off the coast of Bayahibe, but sunk accidentally right in front of Dreams resort. | |
| Catuan | | December 2006 | Scuttled in the area of Juan Dolio at depths ranging from 24 to 60 feet (7.3 to 18.3 m). | |
| Conde de Tolosa | Spain | 25 August 1724 | A Spanish galleon that ran aground during a hurricane in Samaná Bay. | |
| Diomedes | French Navy | | A French ship lost in the fierce maritime Battle of Palenque, in the 17th century, in Palenque, Bani. | |
| Dolphin | United States Coast Guard | | A 64-foot-long (20 m) fishing boat, and sister ship of the Hickory. It lies in El Portillo, Las Terrenas, and has served as an underwater base for rescue operations. | |
| Hickory | United States Coast Guard | 1986 | A 140-foot-long (43 m) former US Coast Guard vessel, commanded by Captain Tracy Bowden for underwater exploration and rescue operations, the Hickory was sunk by Hurricane George while carrying 50 passengers. All survived. It is now a national park in La Caleta, Santo Domingo. | |
| Imperiale | French Navy | | A French ship lost in the Battle of Palenque, in the 17th century, in Palenque, Bani. | |
| RP-14 Limon | | | An old tugboat 155 feet (47 m) long that rests in about 80 feet (24 m) of water very close to the Hickory in the same park. This ship was scuttled there for the same reason – to serve as a tourist attraction. The depth where this shipwreck lies varies from 27–60 feet (8.2–18.3 m). The three propellers of this tugboat are still clearly visible. | |
| London | | | Sunk in the 17th century in Samaná Bay. | |
| Monte Cristi Pipe Wreck | | | Thought to have been a merchant trader, probably sunk in the latter part of the 17th century. Named for the large number of clay smoking pipes it carried as cargo. | |
| Nuestra Señora de Guadalupe | Spain | 24 August 1724 | A Spanish galleon sunk by a hurricane in Samaná Bay. | |
| Nuestra Señora de la Limpia y Pura Concepción, known as La Concepción | Spain | 1641 | This Spanish treasure ship built in 1620 was reportedly overloaded with silver bullion for its return journey to Spain as part of the 1641 treasure fleet. The fleet sailed from Havana on 20 September 1641 but was heavily hit by a hurricane nine days later. Concepción got separated from the main fleet and tried to make for Puerto Rico, but on October 31 foundered and sank on a sand bank north of Hispaniola, which is now called Silver Bank after this shipwreck. First found by William Phips in 1687, his operation managed to salvage 34 tons of silver and other treasure. (Note: Marx gives a monetary amount of more than 2 million pesos, noting that Concepción's official manifest listed less than half of that amount.) Back in England the expedition's revenue was assessed as £205,536. (Note: For comparison: During the Stop of the Exchequer in 1672, both the crown's debt as well as its annual revenue were estimated at £1.2 million.) In the 20th century it was the object of several known treasure hunting expeditions: A. Korganoff in 1952, Edwin Link in 1955, Falcon-Barker in 1962 and Cousteau in 1968, until finally being re-discovered by Burt Webber in 1978. More than 95,000 silver coins, Ming Dynasty ceramics, gold chains, and many other artifacts were salvaged at that time. | |
| Quedagh Merchant | | | An Indian merchant vessel captured on 30 January 1696 by William Kidd, who renamed it the Adventure Prize. Shortly before he was arrested for piracy, Kidd entrusted the ship to hired merchants, who sold off most of the goods, set fire to the ship, and absconded to Holland. The wreck was discovered in 2007 off the coast of Catalina Island. | |
| Scipion | French Navy | October 1782 | A French ship that took part in the blockade against Cornwallis and thus was instrumental in the American Revolutionary War; sunk in a battle against the British fleet. Found and positively identified by Tracy Bowden. Recovered October 2009 by Deep Blue Marine Inc. | |
| St. George | | 1999 | Sunk as an artificial reef near La Romana. | |

== Greenland ==
| Ship | Flag | Sunk date | Notes | Coordinates |
|---|---|---|---|---|
| Coburg | Kriegsmarine | 3 June 1944 | A weather ship that was scuttled at Cape Sussi, Shannon Island. | |
| Hans Hedtoft | Denmark | 30 January 1959 | A liner that struck an iceberg and sank on her maiden voyage off the coast of Western Greenland | |
| Hermann | Kriegsmarine | 17 June 1943 | A weather ship that was scuttled in Hansa Bay. | |
| Kehdingen | Kriegsmarine | 1 September 1944 | A weather ship that was scuttled off Store Koldewey to prevent capture. | 76°30′N 19°02′W |

== Guatemala ==
| Ship | Flag | Sunk date | Notes | Coordinates |
|---|---|---|---|---|
| Springfjord | United Kingdom | 27 June 1954 | A cargo ship that was bombed and sunk off Puerto San José by the CIA, who were engineering a coup d'état in Guatemala. | 13.933°N 90.817°W |

== Haiti ==
| Ship | Flag | Sunk date | Notes | Coordinates |
|---|---|---|---|---|
| Bluenose | Canada | 28 January 1946 | A celebrated Canadian racing schooner that foundered on a reef off Île à Vache. | |
| Crête-à-Pierrot | Haitian Navy | 6 September 1902 | A cruiser that was scuttled to prevent capture while harboured at Gonaïves. | |
| Mary Celeste | United States | 3 January 1885 | A brigantine found in 1872 in the Atlantic Ocean, unmanned and under full sail, heading towards the Strait of Gibraltar. It was later deliberately run aground and burned in an insurance fraud attempt, off the western coast of Port-au-Prince. | |

== Lesser Antilles ==
=== Aruba ===
| Ship | Flag | Sunk date | Notes | Coordinates |
|---|---|---|---|---|
| Antilla | Germany | 10 May 1940 | A supply ship that was scuttled to prevent capture off Aruba. | 12.60175°N 070.05815°W |
| Pedernales | United Kingdom | 16 February 1942 | A lake tanker that was torpedoed by the German submarine U-156, and later towed into a dry dock and cut in three. The fore and aft sections were joined together, and the middle section was sunk as a target. | 12.57889°N 070.05833°W |

=== Bonaire ===
| Ship | Flag | Sunk date | Notes | Coordinates |
|---|---|---|---|---|
| Hilma Hooker | Colombia | 12 September 1984 | A drug-smuggling ship that was seized by the authorities at Bonaire, then took on water and sank at harbour. | 12.1039°N 68.2895°W |

=== British Virgin Islands ===
| Ship | Flag | Sunk date | Notes | Coordinates |
|---|---|---|---|---|
| HMS Astraea | Royal Navy | 23 May 1808 | A British frigate wrecked on Anegada's Horseshoe Reef. | |
| HMS Nymph | Royal Navy | 18 June 1783 | A British sloop that caught fire, foundered, and sank in Road Town's harbour. | |
| RMS Rhone | United Kingdom | 29 October 1867 | A British packet ship wrecked during a hurricane off the coast of Salt Island. | 18.3687°N 64.5356°W |

=== Grenada ===
| Ship | Flag | Sunk date | Notes | Coordinates |
|---|---|---|---|---|
| Bianca C. | France | 24 October 1961 | A passenger ship that was torpedoed and sunk by a German submarine in 1944, before construction on the ship was completed. It sank for the second time near St. George's, following an explosion. | 12.053°N 61.759°W |

=== Martinique ===
| Ship | Flag | Sunk date | Notes | Coordinates |
|---|---|---|---|---|
| Cygne | French Navy | 13 December 1808 | An Abeille-class brig that ran aground off Martinique and was scuttled to prevent capture. | |

=== Saint Kitts and Nevis ===
| Ship | Flag | Sunk date | Notes | Coordinates |
|---|---|---|---|---|
| Christena | St. Kitts and Nevis | 1 August 1970 | A ferry boat that sank off St. Kitts. | |

=== Saint Lucia ===
| Ship | Flag | Sunk date | Notes | Coordinates |
|---|---|---|---|---|
| Angeln | Antigua and Barbuda | 21 February 2010 | A container ship that capsized off Saint Lucia. | |

=== Saint Vincent and the Grenadines ===
| Ship | Flag | Sunk date | Notes | Coordinates |
|---|---|---|---|---|
| Antilles | France | 8 January 1971 | An ocean liner that ran aground on a reef near the island of Mustique. | |

=== Trinidad and Tobago ===
| Ship | Flag | Sunk date | Notes | Coordinates |
|---|---|---|---|---|
| Gulfstream | Unknown | February 2024 | Oil tanker capsized. | |
| Mahiri | United Kingdom | 19 February 1974 | An Empire F type coaster that sprung a leak and sank under tow off Port of Spain. | 10°37′N 61°34′W |

== Mexico ==
| Ship | Flag | Sunk date | Notes | Coordinates |
|---|---|---|---|---|
| USS Alabaster | United States Navy | 1982 | A patrol boat that caught fire off Puerto Vallarta. | |
| USS Belet | United States Navy | 16 January 1972 | A Crosley-class high speed transport that ran aground on Bahia Peninsula. | |
| Challenger | Peru | October 1875 | An extreme clipper that was wrecked in a gale and drifted ashore at Manzanillo. | |
| USS H-1 | United States Navy | 12 March 1920 | A H-class submarine that ran aground off Isla Santa Margarita. | |
| USS Jubilant | United States Navy | August 2001 | An Admirable-class minesweeper that was sunk as an artificial reef off Veracruz. | |
| HMCS Kootenay | Royal Canadian Navy | 2001 | A Restigouche-class destroyer that was sunk as an artificial reef. | |
| HMS Monkey | Royal Navy | 13 May 1831 | A schooner that wrecked while being towed across the bar at Tampico. | |
| USS Palomas | United States Navy | 25 May 1969 | A schooner that ran aground on Sacramento Reef, 4.5 miles (7.2 km) off the coast of Baja California. | |
| HMCS Restigouche | Royal Canadian Navy | 2001 | A Restigouche-class destroyer that was sunk as an artificial reef off Acapulco. | |
| USS Scuffle | United States Navy | 1999 | An Admirable-class minesweeper that was sunk off Cozumel. | |
| USS Somers | United States Navy | 8 December 1846 | A brig that capsized off Veracruz. | |

== Panama ==
| Ship | Flag | Sunk date | Notes | Coordinates |
|---|---|---|---|---|
| Cheribon | Chile | 11 April 1902 | A cargo ship that was wrecked on a reef near Remedios District. | |
| Nuestra Señora de Encarnación | Spain | 1681 | A merchant vessel that sank in a storm at the mouth of the Chagres River. The wreck was rediscovered in 2011. | |
| Sub Marine Explorer | United States | | A submersible that was used for harvesting oysters and pearls in the Pearl Islands, until it was abandoned in 1869. | 8.28158°N 78.8459°W |

== Puerto Rico ==
| Ship | Flag | Sunk date | Notes | Coordinates |
|---|---|---|---|---|
| Antonio López | Spain | 1898 | A transoceanic steamer belonging to the Compañía Transatlántica Española. | 18°28′48″N 66°13′50″W |

== The Bahamas ==
| Ship | Flag | Sunk date | Notes | Coordinates |
|---|---|---|---|---|
| USS Adirondack | United States Navy | 23 August 1862 | A sloop-of-war that struck a reef off Man-O-War Cay. | |
| HMS Algerine | Royal Navy | 20 May 1813 | A Pigmy-class schooner that was wrecked on the Little Bahama Bank. | |
| USS Chippewa | United States Navy | 12 December 1816 | A brig that ran aground on a reef. | |
| HMS Conqueror | Royal Navy | 13 December 1861 | A Conqueror-class ship of the line that was wrecked on Rum Cay. | |
| USS Courier | United States Navy | 14 June 1864 | A storeship and gunboat that ran aground in the Abaco Islands. | |
| El Faro | United States | 1 October 2015 | A cargo ship that was sunk by Hurricane Joaquin near Crooked Island. | |
| Logna | Bahamas | 16 October 1982 | A cargo ship that was scuttled as a dive site and artificial reef about two miles offshore of Xanadu Beach Resort & Marina, Grand Bahama; known as "Theo's Wreck". | |
| HMS Nimble | Royal Navy | 4 November 1834 | A schooner employed in anti-slave trade patrol until it struck a reef in the Old Bahama Channel. | |
| USS San Jacinto | United States Navy | 1 January 1865 | A steam frigate that struck a reef near Great Abaco Island. | |
| Sapona | United States | 1926 | A cargo steamer run aground near Bimini during a hurricane. | 25°39.040′N 79°17.593′W |
| Highbourne Cay Wreck | Unknown | 1500–1525 | Early 16th century ship, with possibly three masts, found in shallow water. | 24°44′11″N 76°49′10″W |

== Turks and Caicos Islands ==
| Ship | Flag | Sunk date | Notes | Coordinates |
|---|---|---|---|---|
| 2009 Turks and Caicos Islands migrant shipwreck | Haiti | 26 July 2009 | A wooden boat carrying migrants from Haiti that capsized near West Caicos. | |
| General Pershing | United States | 11 July 1921 | A schooner that was wrecked on Endymion Rock. | |
| Molasses Reef Wreck | Unknown | Unknown | Early 16th-century Spanish shipwreck, the earliest European shipwreck in the Americas to be scientifically excavated. | |
| Trouvadore | Spain | March 1841 | A Spanish slave ship that was wrecked off East Caicos. The crew were arrested upon reaching land, and the 168 Africans took up residence at Grand Turk Island. | |
