= Turks and Caicos National Museum =

Museum in Grand Turk Island

Coordinates: 21°28′18″N 71°8′51″W

Turks & Caicos National Museum
- Turks & Caicos National Museum
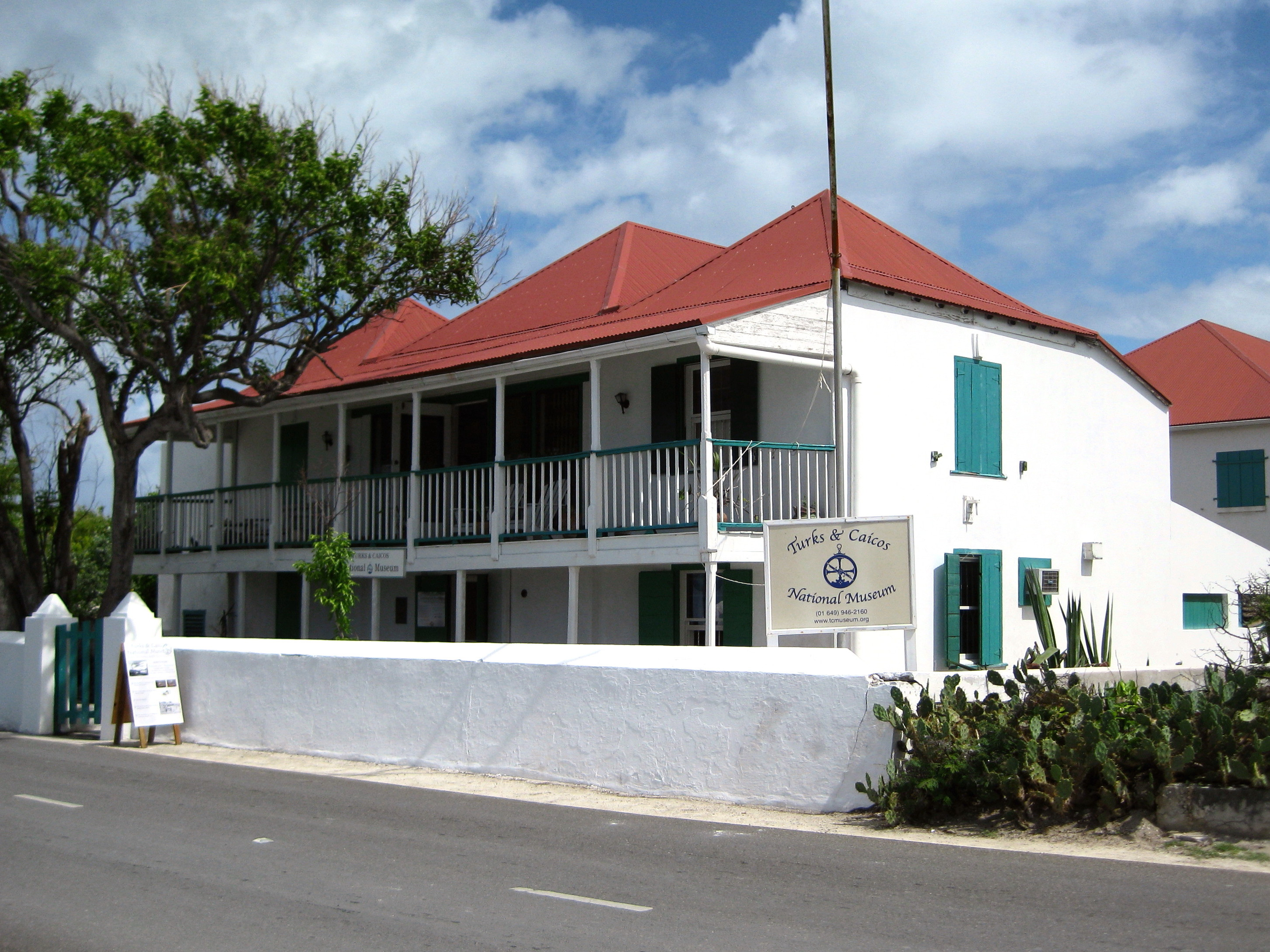
- Established: In 1980s, opened in 1991
- Location: Cockburn Town, Grand Turk Island
- Type: Historical
- Website: Turks & Caicos National Museum.

The Turks and Caicos National Museum is the national museum of the Turks and Caicos Islands. It is located in Guinep House on Front Street to the north of Cockburn Town on Grand Turk Island, which is also the capital of the archipelago. Established in the 1980s and opened in 1991, the museum is publicly funded as a nonprofit trust. It exhibits pre-historic Lucayan culture and records the history of the islands of the colonial era and the slave trade, all related to the sea. An arboretum is adjacent to the museum.

== History ==
The museum is housed in one of the oldest stone structures in the island, a building called the Guinep house. The house, built prior to 1885, was named after the large guinep tree in the front yard. It was built in local limestone by a former shipwright. The structural material of the building also came from local shipwrecks, including a ship's mast, which is one of the building's main supports. The building which was earlier a lodge for some of the divers, was donated to the museum in 1990.

== Displays ==
=== Ground floor ===
Located at the museum is the Molasses Reef Wreck, which is dated to 1505 and is considered to be the oldest shipwreck located in the Americas. It was an early Spanish ship which foundered on the rim of Caicos Island. Remnants of the ship wreck that on display are the hull and rigging, cannon, cross bows, and personal belongings of the crew. Characterized as a “time capsule” it provides insight into the lifestyle of the early explorers.

A separate room showcases maritime displays. This includes the original lens of the Grand Turk Lighthouse, dated to 1852. There is a 3 dimensional exhibit of a coral reef. Another interesting exhibit, probably the only one of its kind, is the display of the bottles with messages (40 years' worth of messages to wash upon the shores of Grand Turk) that floated to the beaches here from all over the world, and which were collected and exhibited.

=== Second floor ===
Upstairs exhibits include the islands' history of the early settlers of the island: the Taíno people, African, North American, Bermudan, French and Latin American. There are displays on Lucayan artefacts, sisal and salt industries, Caicos postage stamps, history of the slave trade, royal events, and pottery. Visits to the island by John Glenn (the first American to orbit the Earth making the landfall on this island.), Scott Carpenter and Queen Elizabeth are commemorated here. Another important display is of the salt trade, which was the world's largest at one time, located on the island of Salt Cay. Bermudans were the first settlers on the cay in 1645, with salt production commencing in 1673 and lasting till the 1960s. Now inscribed as a UNESCO World Heritage Site, the site was developed with a maze of walls and canal system, presented in the form of an exhibit in the museum.

== Features ==
The museum contains conservation labs and an exhibition workshop. There is also a curatorial facility and both a lecture room and an area which doubles as an office and the museum's library. The oral history is a continuing information system. Exhibits are all interactive with video and audio facilitates. An arboretum is attached to museum facility. It is functional and self-guide booklets are available to guide treks marked with trail markers, which are unique as the telephone poles which were damaged during hurricane Ike have been used to fix markers. There is a gift shop which sells Turks and Caicos Islands' centric artifacts. Some of the local products of interest are sea-glass jewelry made out of glass found in the beaches, straw hats and baskets from Middle Caicos, salts and bath salts from Salt Cay. A walking tour of the Lucayan Cave is offered to explore artifacts made of wood.

The museum has launched an archaeological exploration program called the "Travadore project" which is in association with marine archaeologists. Under this project, the programme preserves the islands' shipwreck sites and prevents any treasure hunters robbing the treasures under the auspices of seeking license to dive and hunt for treasures on the islands. This project's importance is that the present settlers on the island are stated to have blood links to the people, particularly of African origin, who perished in the shipwrecks. Some of the historical finds recovered under this project are exhibits in the museum. The exhibits of the Trouvadore Shipwreck project (the Molasses Reef Wreck) is under further exploration.
