= UK Overseas Territories Conservation Forum =

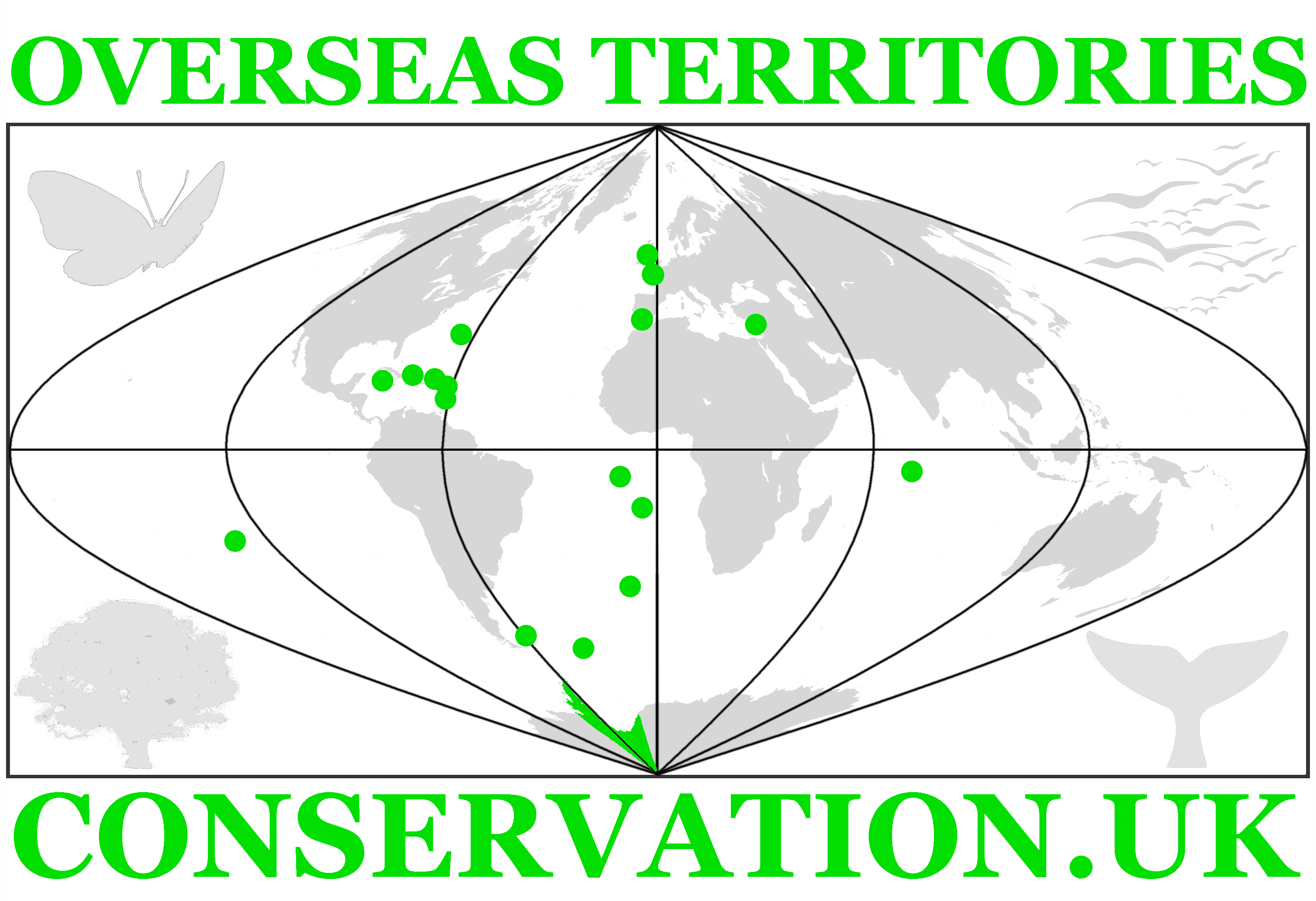
- Abbreviation: UKOTCF
- Formation: 1987
- Legal status: Charitable Company
- Purpose: To promote coordinated conservation in the UK Overseas Territories & Crown Dependencies
- Headquarters: UK
- Website: ukotcf.org.uk

The UK Overseas Territories Conservation Forum (UKOTCF), also known as Overseas Territories Conservation, is a UK-based non-governmental organisation which promotes coordinated conservation in the UK Overseas Territories and Crown Dependencies (UKOTs and CDs). It is a not-for-profit organisation supported by grants, donations and subscriptions, and a registered charity and company.

== Governance ==
UKOTCF is a non-profit organisation, constituted as a Charitable Company under the laws of England & Wales. The governing document is the Memorandum and Articles of Association. Under the Memorandum and Articles and subsidiary documents, UKOTCF is run by a Council of up to 12 persons elected by the member organisations. Council members are elected for 3-year, renewable terms, each year four places come up for election on rotation.

== Aims ==
The UKOTs (also known as the British Overseas Territories) are internationally recognised for their exceptionally rich and varied natural environments. They contain an estimated 90% of the biodiversity found within the UK and the territories combined. The UK and territory governments bear joint responsibility for conserving and protecting the rich natural heritage of the UKOTs, and work together to meet obligations under international environmental agreements. UKOTCF is the only organisation working solely on cross-territory UKOT environmental issues, providing assistance in the form of expertise, information and liaison between non-governmental organisations and governments, both in the UK and in the territories themselves.

== Member organisations ==
UKOTCF has over 30 member and associate organisations.

These are: Amphibian and Reptile Conservation Trust, Bermuda National Trust, National Parks Trust of the Virgin Islands, Gibraltar Ornithological & Natural History Society, Alderney Wildlife Trust, Anguilla Archaeological & History Society, Anguilla National Trust, Ascension Conservation Centre, Ascension Heritage Society, BirdLife Cyprus, Bermuda Audubon Society, Bermuda Zoological Society, United Kingdom Antarctic Heritage Trust, National Trust for the Cayman Islands, Central Caribbean Marine Institute, Chagos Conservation Trust, Akrotiri Environmental Education & Information Centre (Cyprus SBA), Gibraltar Ornithological & Natural History Society, La Société Guernesiaise, Isle of Man Department of Environment, Food & Agriculture, National Trust for Jersey, Société Jersiaise, Jost Van Dykes Preservation Society, Montserrat National Trust, Pitcairn Natural Resources Department, La Société Sercquiais, Saint Helena National Trust, Turks and Caicos National Museum, National Trust of the Turks & Caicos Islands, Turks & Caicos Reef Fund, Army Ornithological Society, Royal Air Force Ornithological Society, Royal Naval Birdwatching Society.

In addition to the member and associate organisations, UKOTCF has links with a number of other organisations including 1% for the Planet and the International Union for Conservation of Nature (IUCN).

== Projects ==
A selection of UKOTCF's projects are detailed in the table below:

Date	Project	Territory	Main Partner(s)
1993	Core Development of the Forum and Support for NGOs in UK Dependent Territories	All	Funded by the Darwin Initiative
1999	Developing biodiversity management capacity around the Ramsar site in Turks and Caicos Islands	Turks & Caicos Islands	CABI Bioscience, Turks & Caicos organisations, funded by the Darwin Initiative
1999	A Breath of Fresh Air: an international conference on environmental conservation in small territories	Cross Territory	Foreign & Commonwealth Office's (FCO) Environment, Science & Energy Department
2000	Calpe 2000: Linking the Fragments of Paradise: an international conference on environmental conservation in small territories	Cross Territory	Government of Gibraltar, Gibraltar Ornithological & Natural History Society, UK Government
2003	A Sense of Direction: a conference on conservation in UK Overseas Territories and other small island communities	Cross Territory	Bermuda Ministry of Environment, Bermuda National Trust, Bermuda Zoological Society, Bermuda Audubon Society, UK Government
2006	Biodiversity that Matters: a conference on conservation in UK Overseas Territories and other small island communities	Cross Territory	Société Jersiaise, National Trust for Jersey, Durrell Wildlife Conservation Trust, UK Government
2007	Net-Biome	Cross Territory	Regional Council of La Réunion, Regional Council of la Guadeloupe, Regional Council of Guyane, Regional Council of Martinique, Regional Government of Canary Islands, Regional Government of Madeira, Regional Government of Azores, Government of New Caledonia, Ministry of Public Health and Social Development, Netherlands Antilles Government and Government of French Polynesia, European Union
2009	Making the Right Connections: a conference on conservation in UK Overseas Territories, Crown Dependencies and other small island communities	Cross Territory	National Trust for the Cayman Islands, Government of the Cayman Islands Department for the Environment, Foreign and Commonwealth Office, Department for International Development, Department for Environment, Food and Rural Affairs
2010	Management of Protected Areas to Support Sustainable Economies (MPASSE)	Cayman Islands, British Virgin Islands, Turks & Caicos Islands	National Trust for the Cayman Islands, Blue Iguana Recovery Program, the National Parks Trust of the Virgin Islands, Turks & Caicos National Trust, European Union
2011	'Wonderful Water' Curriculum	Turks & Caicos Islands	Turks & Caicos Islands Government Education Department
2014	Wise Water Use for Gardens	Turks & Caicos Islands	Turks and Caicos National Museum, RBC Foundation
2015	Sustaining Partnerships: a conference on conservation and sustainability in UK Overseas Territories, Crown Dependencies and other small island communities	Cross Territory	Government of Gibraltar's Department of the Environment and Climate Change, Gibraltar Ornithological & Natural History Society
2016	Review on Progress in implementing the Environment Charters or their equivalents and towards Aichi Targets	Cross Territory	Consultees across all Territories
2016	Maximising long-term survival prospects of Montserrat's endemic species and ecosystem-services	Montserrat	Montserrat National Trust, Montserrat Department of Environment, Montana State University, Treweek Consulting Ltd, funded by the Darwin Plus Fund

== Website ==
The UKOTCF website and database contain extensive information on conservation priorities for the UKOTs, as well as funding sources, environmental education resources and specific information on projects carried out in the UKOTs. The database was incorporated in response to requests from the territories, designed so that information can be added and updated by partner organisations. The database modules help to track critical sites (and common issues across sites), conservation priorities, projects within the UKOTs/CDs, environmental education resources and other information on a wide variety of subjects. The database has been described as ' a valuable resource for conservation practitioners in the Overseas Territories ' by the Institute of Zoology.

In addition to an annual report, UKOTCF also publishes the Forum News newsletter several times a year. These can also be found on the UKOTCF website and provide the latest news relevant to the UKOTs.

In 2018, a new website was launched at www.ukotcf.org.uk

== Virtual tours ==
The UKOTs are important parts of the UK, not foreign countries. Although small in size, they support far more endemic taxa and other globally important biodiversity than does Britain and Ireland. They are also important for their historical and cultural heritage, both in their own right, and their historical links for UK. However, there is little public awareness, either within UKOTs or in mainland UK, of the biodiversity and cultural importance of the UKOTs, and the challenges they face. UKOTCF raises awareness of the territories and the UK's responsibility to them through its 'Virtual Tours' of the territories. The virtual tours draw attention to the biodiversity and cultural value, and highlight the challenges they face and the opportunities to protect and conserve their important features.

== Conferences ==
UKOTCF has organised six international environment conferences since 1999, the most recent being held in Gibraltar in 2015, with support from HM Government of Gibraltar and the Gibraltar Ornithological & Natural History Society. UKOTCF conferences bring together conservation professionals from across the UKOTs, CDs and beyond, providing a forum in which to share information and best practice, and forge stronger environmental links between UK Overseas Territories, Crown Dependencies and other small island nations. The latest conference included involvement of environment ministers from several territories. Proceedings of all UKOTCF-organised conferences are publicly available on the UKOTCF website.

2015 - Gibraltar: Sustaining Partnerships: a conference on conservation and sustainability in UK Overseas Territories, Crown Dependencies and other small island communities.

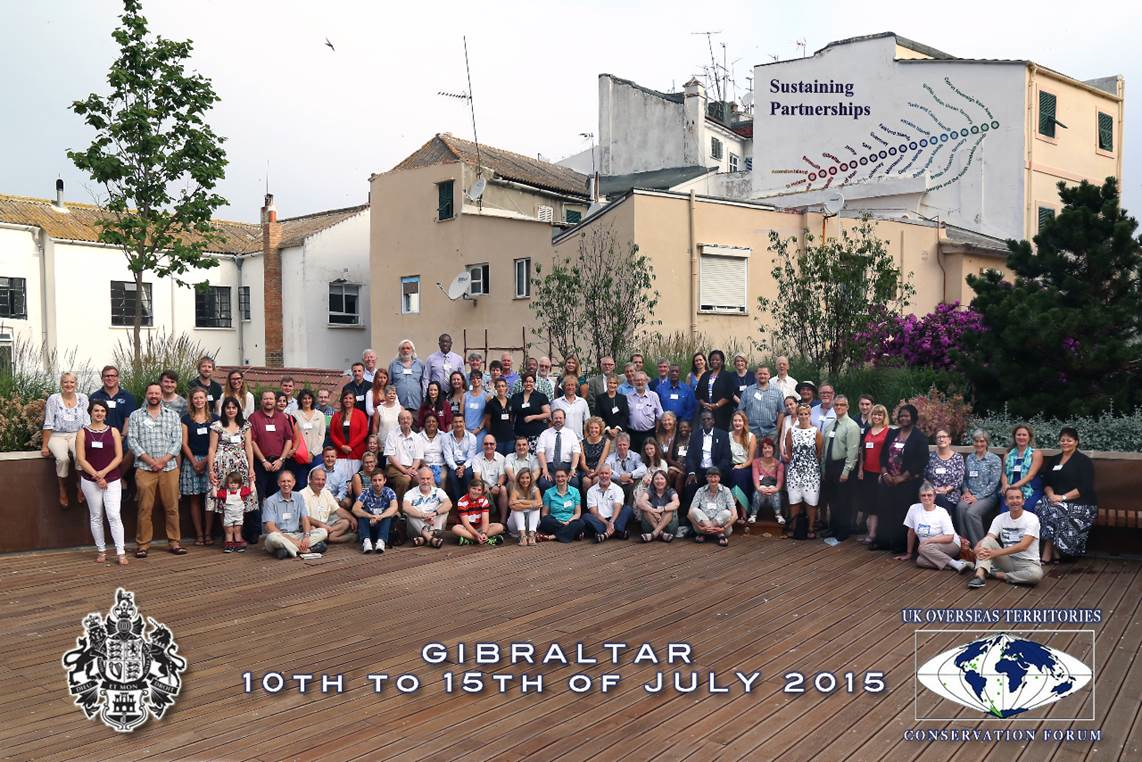
HMGOG UKOTCF 2015 Gibraltar Conference Participants

Gibraltar hosted an international environmental conference "Sustaining Partnerships" from 11 to 15 July 2015, with a focus on UK Overseas Territories, Crown Dependencies and other small islands.

The conference provided a forum for government environmental bodies, NGOs and commercial organisations to discuss key conservation issues, to highlight success stories, exchange ideas, and to forge partnerships. It is hoped that Overseas Territories, Crown Dependencies and other small island communities that share similar environmental problems benefit from learning about one another's history and experience of planning and conservation initiatives. The overall aim was to draw on similarities and differences in experience across the territories, to provide insights into common challenges, and leave participants better equipped to address local needs.

2009 - Grand Cayman: Making the Right Connections: a conference on conservation in UK Overseas Territories, Crown Dependencies and other small island communities

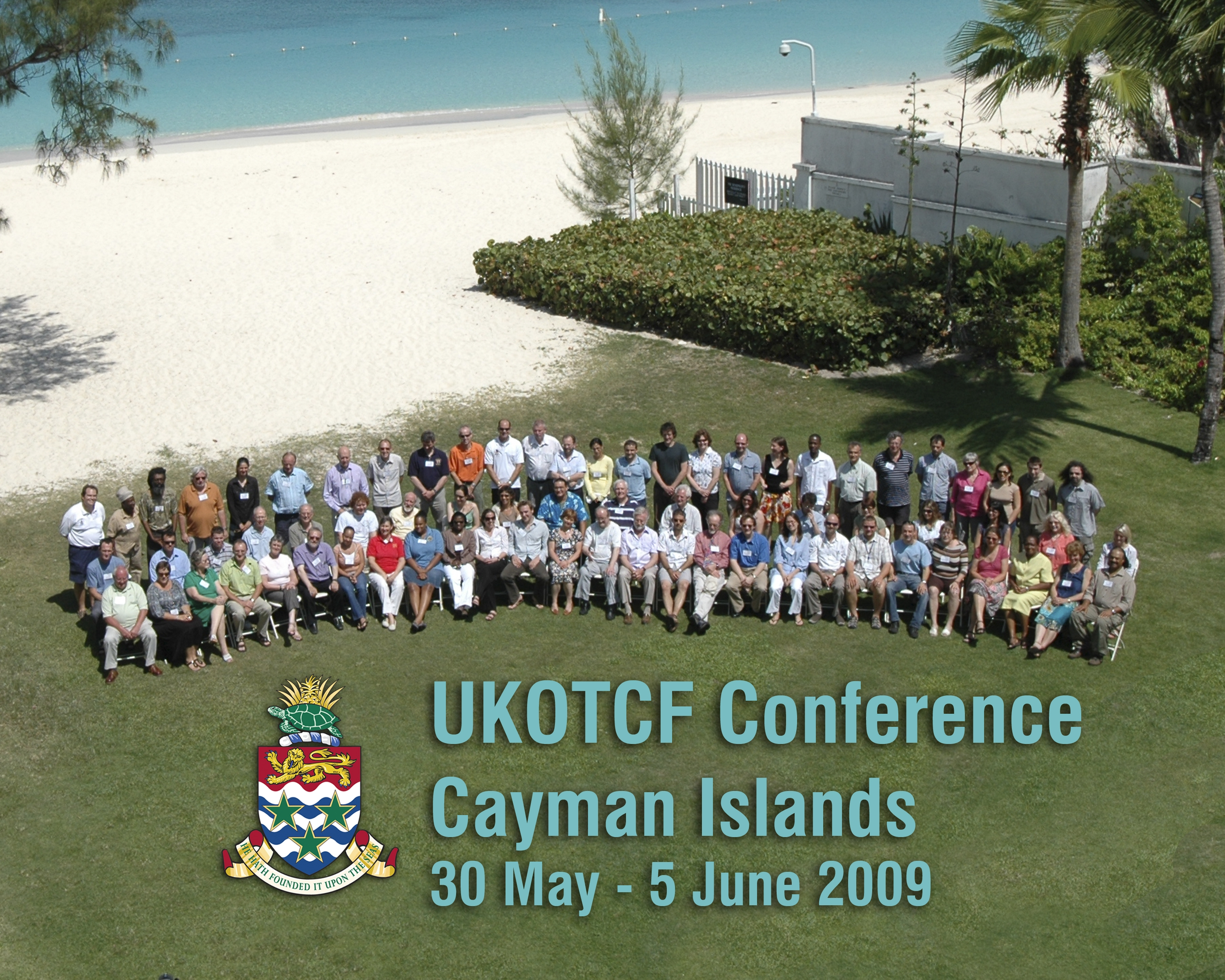
UKOTCF 2009 Cayman Conference Participants

The Cayman Islands hosted an international environmental conference from 30 May to 5 June 2009, with a focus on UK Overseas Territories, Crown Dependencies and other small islands.

The conference provided a forum for government environmental bodies and NGOs to discuss key conservation issues, to highlight success stories, exchange ideas, and to forge partnerships, so that UK Overseas Territories, Crown Dependencies and other small island communities that share similar environmental problems benefit from learning about one another's history and experience of planning and conservation initiatives.

2006 - Jersey: Biodiversity that Matters: a conference on conservation in UK Overseas Territories and other small island communities

Organised by: UK Overseas Territories Conservation Forum, with the support of the Overseas Territories Environment Programme, and hosted by the Jersey conservation bodies.

This conference was designed to be of help in some of the priority issues identified by workers in small territories. Main sessions were:

- Environmental education and the UKOTs
- Environment Charters and strategic planning
- Integration of conservation and sustainable livelihoods: terrestrial and marine, including fisheries
- Obtaining and Using Resources (not just money)
- Species conservation issues: dealing with alien invasive species and species recovery including captive breeding

2003 - Bermuda: A Sense of Direction: a conference on conservation in UK Overseas Territories and other small island communities

Organised by Bermuda Ministry of Environment, Bermuda National Trust, Bermuda Zoological Society, Bermuda Audubon Society and UK Overseas Territories Conservation Forum.

The conference provided a forum for government environmental agencies and NGOs to discuss key conservation issues, to highlight success stories, exchange ideas, and to forge partnerships. It was planned that Overseas Territories, and other small island communities that share similar environmental problems, should benefit from Bermuda's experiences and history of planning and conservation initiatives. Bermuda planned to learn from the success of environmental programmes tried and tested elsewhere.

2000 - Gibraltar: Calpe 2000: Linking the Fragments of Paradise: an international conference on environmental conservation in small territories

Sponsored by the Government of Gibraltar, organised by the Gibraltar Ornithological & Natural History Society, with the support of the UK Overseas Territories Conservation Forum.

This conference formed one of a new series sponsored by the Government of Gibraltar, under the series title "Calpe", which is the old Roman name for Gibraltar. This particular conference addressed the very topical issue of environmental conservation. Its title reflects one of the first publications (Fragments of Paradise: A Guide for Conservation Action in the U.K. Dependent Territories, 1987) highlighting the immense biodiversity value of the UK Overseas Territories, and the need to provide for increased exchange of knowledge between them and other areas.

1999 - London: A Breath of Fresh Air: an international conference on environmental conservation in small territories

The conference formed part of the process of taking forward the issues highlighted in the environmental chapter of UK Government's White Paper of March 1999 'Partnership for Progress and Prosperity — Britain and the Overseas Territories'. It was organised by the Foreign & Commonwealth Office's (FCO) Environment, Science & Energy Department (ESED) with the support of the UK Overseas Territories Conservation Forum. The meeting had 3 main purposes:

- Bring together the governmental, NGO and other organisations in the UK, the Overseas Territories (OTs) and elsewhere who are stakeholders in the OTs’ environment, thus facilitating joint approaches to the challenging work needed to conserve these important natural assets and resources, for the people of the OTs themselves and for the wider world.
- Identify the key priority needs as seen by people working in the OTs.
- Further clarify ways for them to access the skills and commitment of the range of UK government departments and agencies (co-ordinated by the FCO) and NGOs (co-ordinated through UKOTCF).

== Volunteers ==
As a non-profit organisation, UKOTCF draws largely on the efforts of highly skilled volunteers. Their specialisms include environmental education, invasive species, wetlands management, planning and development, ornithology, ecology, biodiversity strategies and climate change, to name a few. An important aspect of UKOTCF's work involves organising specialist volunteer support for UKOTs and deployment of volunteers to support capacity building in local NGOs.

Previous placements include:

- Dhekelia Turtle Watch (Cyprus SBA)
- St Helena National Trust
- Akrotiri Environmental Education Centre (Cyprus SBA)
- Turks & Caicos National Trust
- Cross-territory support

== Other activities ==
Working Groups

UKOTCF runs Working Groups for the different UKOT regions, namely the Southern Oceans Working Group (SOWG), Europe Territories Working Group (ETWG) and Wider Caribbean Working Group (WCWG). Through e-Newsletters and regular Skype meetings, these provide a way for Territories to exchange expert knowledge and information, and a platform for determining common issues/requirements and coordinating activities.

Workshops

UKOTCF held a workshop in Montserrat in May 2016. This was held in association with Montserrat's Department of the Environment and looked to gather information from a range of attendees as to what work could potentially be done in the south of the Island. This forms part of a wider project which is looking to guarantee the preservation of the Territory's endemic flora and fauna. One problem identified as being particularly important was the need to address the feral livestock issue in South Montserrat. Other issues that would need to be addressed to carry out work in the area were also discussed, e.g. access and safety, important considerations in light of the volcanic activity in the south.

In partnership with UKOTCF, the Montserrat National Trust and Montserrat Department of Environment held a workshop in January 2015 on Environmental Impact Assessment.

In January 2014, at the request of the House of Commons Environmental Audit Committee (EAC), UKOTCF organised a workshop to mark the publication of the EAC report Sustainability in the UK Overseas Territories.

In 2010 and 2011, UKOTCF organised workshops on biodiversity strategies, trying to complement the UK Government biodiversity 'strategy' for UKOTs. Following the publication of the UK Government's 2012 White Paper, UKOTCF analysed the White Paper and produced a review, which was later followed by a workshop titled 'Environmental conservation and UK Government's June 2012 White Paper The Overseas Territories: Security, Success and Sustainability'.

Britain's Treasure Islands

UKOTCF Officers contributed towards naturalist Stewart McPherson's Britain's Treasure Islands series. The aim of this project was to demonstrate the enormous variety in natural and cultural heritage of the UKOTs as well as elements of their histories. This culminated in the production of a natural history book, a series of 42 mini-documentaries, and a TV documentary series that was broadcast on BBC Four in April 2016.

In association with Stewart McPherson, UKOTCF also helped to organise an event held on 24 March 2016 at the Royal Geographical Society. During this evening event, Stewart provided an account of his travels to all of the UKOTs and across the incredible variety of ecosystems and biodiversity that they have to offer.

YouTube videos

UKOTCF have a YouTube channel which is used occasionally to add film of the UKOTs.

Turks & Caicos Islands Bird Tours

UKOTCF in collaboration with the Turks and Caicos National Museum organised a 'Bird Week' which ran from 11 to 15 July 2011. A Bird Walking Tour and a Bird Driving Tour on Grand Turk were both officially opened during this week, made possible thanks to a grant from the Carnival/TCInvest/TCIGovernment Infrastructure Fund. The trails have clearly marked signs for people to follow and guides can be found at the museum

== Publications ==
Birding in Paradise

A series of guide booklets on bird-watching on the islands that are part of the UK Overseas Territories. They are published by the UK Overseas Territories Conservation Forum, working together with local partners. The series so far consists of:

- Turks & Caicos Islands(Grand Turk, Providenciales, Middle & North Caicos, South Caicos, Salt Cay)

- The Caribbean Emerald Isle of Montserrat

Progress in implementing the Environment Charters or their equivalent

- Review of performance by 2016 of UK Overseas Territories and Crown Dependencies in implementing the 2001 Environment Charters or their equivalents and moving towards the Aichi Targets and Sustainable Development Goals, 2016

- Measures of performance by 2009 of UK Overseas Territories (& Crown Dependencies) and UK Government in implementing the 2001 Environment Charters or their equivalents, 2009

- Measures of performance by 2007 of UKOTs and UK Government in implementing the 2001 Environment Charters or their equivalents, 2007

Review of existing and potential Ramsar sites in UK Overseas Territories and Crown Dependencies, 2005

This was a review commissioned by DEFRA in 2003. Prior to the project, 15 Ramsar sites had been designated in the UK Overseas Territories and Crown Dependencies under the Ramsar Convention. As a result of this review, the number of recommended Ramsar sites rose to 76, in addition to the 15 previously designated.
