= Molasses Reef (disambiguation) =

Molasses Reef is a component of the Florida Reef near Key Largo.

Molasses Reef may also refer to:

- Molasses Reef Light, a navigation light on Molasses Reef in Florida
- Molasses Reef (Turks and Caicos Islands), site of an early 16th-century Spanish shipwreck
