= List of lighthouses in the Turks and Caicos Islands =

This is a list of lighthouses in Turks and Caicos Islands.

== Lighthouses ==
Name	Image	Year built	Location & coordinates	Class of Light	Focal height	NGA number	Admiralty number	Range nml
South Caicos Lighthouse		1890	Cockburn Harbour; 21°29′18.5″N 71°31′42.9″W	F W	5 metres (16 ft)	12392	J4808	9
Grand Turk Lighthouse		1852	Cockburn Town; 21°30′41.8″N 71°08′01.1″W	Fl W 7.5s.	18 metres (59 ft)	12408	J4812	18

== See also ==
- Lists of lighthouses and lightvessels
