= Robinson High School =

Robinson High School may refer to:

Canada

- M.M. Robinson High School — Burlington, Ontario

Turks and Caicos Islands (United Kingdom)

- HJ Robinson High School — Cockburn Town, Grand Turk Island

United States

- Jay M. Robinson High School — Concord, North Carolina
- Joe T. Robinson High School — Little Rock, Arkansas
- Robinson High School (Illinois) — Robinson, Illinois
- Robinson High School (Texas) — Robinson, Texas
- Robinson Secondary School — Fairfax County, Virginia
- Thomas Richard Robinson High School — Tampa, Florida
