= HJ Robinson High School =

Senior high school in Cockburn Town, Turks and Caicos operated by the government

Coordinates: 21°27′54″N 71°08′24″W

Helena Jones Robinson High School is a senior high school in Cockburn Town, Grand Turk Island, Turks and Caicos. Operated by the Ministry of Education, Youth, Culture, and Library Services, it is the only senior high school in Cockburn Town.

== History ==
Circa 2016 the school had 500 students. New facilities in the administration building opened in 2015; the ministry spent $2 million U.S. dollars, including $400,000 for furniture and other infrastructure, to develop an administration building, which included not only the offices of administrative officials but also additional classrooms, a library, and a printing room. In January 2016 a fire damaged that building's highest floor. Computers and student records were lost as a result. As a result, the T&C government stated it would rebuild. There were private fundraisers for the school in the wake of the fire, with one netting $1,457.
