= Turks & Caicos Reef Fund =

The Turks and Caicos Reef Fund a 501(c)(3) organization was established to help preserve and protect the environment of the "Beautiful by Nature" Turks and Caicos Islands - an environment that draws so many visitors and is critical to the economic and physical survival of the islands themselves. The goal is to dedicate more than 85% of all funds raised through this effort to environmental protection projects each year.

Don Stark and David Stone are the co-founders of the Turks and Caicos Reef Fund. As visitors to the Turks and Caicos Islands (TCI), which is a British Overseas Territory, for many years and part-time residents for the past several years, both Don and David have seen firsthand the challenges to the marine environment that the Turks and Caicos Islands face such as over-fishing and the impact of major new commercial developments. The TCI Government is doing what it can through the Department of Environment & Maritime Affairs (DEMA), which is also referred to as the Department of Environment and Coastal Resources. The TC Reef Fund supplements and complements those efforts.

== Fund Raising Initiatives in Support of Projects ==
The projects are intended to help educate, protect and monitor the health of the Turks and Caicos Islands' environment, especially coral reefs and their inhabitants around the Turks and Caicos Islands.

Date	Project	Description	Partners
2010	BCD Tags and bracelets	Scuba divers can purchase tags or bracelets as a means of supporting the TC Reef Fund and collect memorabilia of their experience in TCI.	Aqua TCI, Big Blue Unlimited, Blue Water Divers, Bohio Dive Resort, Caribbean Cruisin', Club Med, Dive Provo, Flamingo Divers, Grand Turk Diving, Oasis Divers, Provo Turtle Divers, Salt Cay Divers, Turks & Caicos Aggressor II, Turks & Caicos Explorer II, The Unicorn Book Store
2012	Dive Boat Mooring Project	Installation and maintenance of scuba dive boat, snorkel boat, and yacht moorings throughout the TCI under the terms of a Memorandum of Understanding with the Department of Environment and Coastal Affairs (DECR). DECR is the local governmental agency responsible for maintaining the marine protected areas in the TCI as well as all other environmental issues. As of September 2015, the Turks & Caicos Reef Fund has installed -67 proper sea floor anchors and mooring lines for dive boat moorings -16 snorkel boat moorings -5 yacht moorings (21 of the dive moorings and all snorkel and yacht moorings are brand new dive sites). Link to Dive Site Summary List. ||	
2012	TCI Dolphin Defense Fund	Create a Dolphin Sanctuary and Rehabilitation Centre to provide a home to the dolphins who are being retired from entertaining the public. This place will be available to retrain the dolphins to live back in the wild, or to stay in a comfortable and natural location for the remainder of their lives. "There is about as much educational benefit to be gained in studying dolphins in captivity as there would be studying mankind by only observing prisoners held in solitary confinement." – Jacques Cousteau	
2014	Adopt a Coral Program	Individuals can adopt a coral fragment for 50USD that has been rescued from a damaged area on the TCI reef (from storms or boat damage). The fragment is cared for in a special coral nursery until it is large enough to be transplanted back onto the local reefs. This is part of the Coral Preservation and Restoration Program (Reef CPR). Participants receive adoption papers	
2016	Report a Lionfish	In an effort to track the Lionfish invasion around TCI, scuba divers and snorkelers are asked to report sightings. Reporting Page.	
2016	RESCQ: Restoration of Ecosystem Services and Coral Reef Quality	This 3 year project (RESCQ: Restoration of Ecosystem Services and Coral Reef Quality) is funded by the EU through the Best 2.0 Programme, with a co-funding from the Dutch Ministry of Economic Affairs. Through collaborative efforts, the partners will seek to restore coral reefs on St Maarten, Saba, St Eustatius and Turks and Caicos Islands. The project will restore Elkhorn (Acropora palmata) and Staghorn (A. cervicornis) coral reef zones by establishing a coral nursery on each of the four islands to grow coral fragments and transplantation at selected restoration sites	IMARES Wageningen UR, Saba Conservation Foundation, Stenapa St Eustatius, and the Turks & Caicos Reef Fund.

== Partnerships ==
The UK Overseas Territories Conservation Forum (UKOTCF) is a UK-based non-governmental organisation which promotes coordinated conservation in the UK Overseas Territories and Crown Dependencies (UKOTs and CDs). It is a not-for-profit organisation supported by grants, donations and subscriptions, and a registered charity and company.
