= Grand Turk Parade Ground =

Sports stadium. Cricket ground in Turks and Caicos Islands

- Interactive map of Grand Turk Parade Ground
- Location: Cockburn Town, Grand Turk, Turks and Caicos Islands
- Coordinates: 21°27′54″N 71°08′32″W
- Capacity: 500
- Surface: Grass

The Grand Turk Parade Ground is a multi-use stadium in Cockburn Town, Grand Turk, Turks and Caicos Islands. It is currently used for athletics, cricket, rugby union, and football competitions. In addition to hosting sporting events, the stadium hosts other important functions, such as the funeral of James Alexander George Smith McCartney, the country's first Chief Minister.

== History ==
Prior to becoming a sports grounds, the Parade Ground site was the location of the island's first school. In September 2018, the government of the Turks and Caicos Islands put out a call for bids to renovate the historic Parade Grounds. The upgrades would include installation of a new playing surface with improved drainage, a new grandstand, and new lighting, among other improvements. The stadium required renovation because of years of heavy use and damage caused by Hurricane Irma and Hurricane Maria in 2017. By March 2019, renovation work was well underway at the site. The majority was the work at the stadium, including surface and grandstand, were expected to be complete by December 2020.
