= Cockburn Harbour =

Harbour in the Turks and Caicos Islands

South Caicos Lighthouse
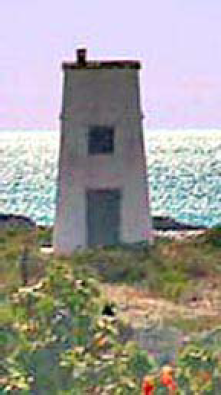
- Location: Cockburn Harbour; Turks and Caicos Islands
- Coordinates: 21°29′18″N 71°31′43″W

Tower
- Constructed: 1890
- Foundation: concrete base
- Construction: concrete tower
- Height: 5 m (16 ft)
- Shape: square frustum tower with light shown through a window
- Markings: white tower
- Power source: solar power

Light
- Focal height: 15 m (49 ft)
- Range: 9 nmi (17 km; 10 mi)
- Characteristic: F W

Cockburn Harbour is a settlement in the Turks and Caicos. It is the largest community on the island of South Caicos, with some 811 people. It has the best natural harbour of the Caicos Islands, and was once an important centre for regional trade and a major exporter of salt. Today its main industries are fishing and tourism.

== See also ==
- List of lighthouses in the Turks and Caicos Islands
