= Gibraltar Ornithological & Natural History Society =

Nature conservation organisation

GONHS official logo.

The Gibraltar Ornithological & Natural History Society (GONHS), founded in 1976, is a non-governmental, membership-based organisation committed to research into and conservation of nature in Gibraltar and the region of the Strait of Gibraltar.

It works independently and in collaboration with other organisations and scientific or conservation institutions to achieve these aims.

GONHS is a Partner of BirdLife International, a member of IUCN (The World Conservation Union), of the UK Overseas Territories Conservation Forum, the British Trust for Ornithology, the Iberian Council for the Defence of Nature, the Association of European Rarities Committees, and Countdown 2010.

Its first General Secretary was Dr. John Cortes who served until 2011.
