= 2009 Turks and Caicos Islands migrant shipwreck =

2009 migrant boat disaster near the Turks and Caicos Islands

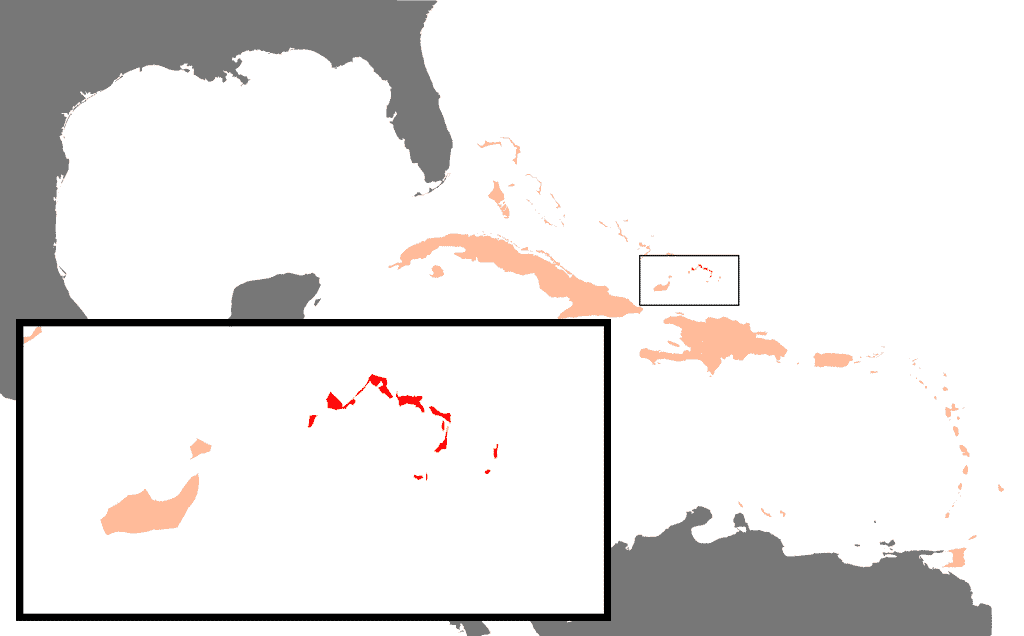
The shipwreck occurred near the Turks and Caicos Islands.

The 2009 Turks and Caicos Islands migrant shipwreck was the loss of a motorless boat carrying Haitian migrants near the Turks and Caicos Islands in the northern West Indies on the night of 26 July 2009. Sixty-five persons went missing; earlier figures of 79 missing migrants were reduced as bodies were recovered. After 2 days at least fifteen corpses had been located.

The boat had spent three days at sea before it capsized. One survivor said the craft ended up on a reef while attempting to escape a patrolling police vessel. A Turks and Caicos police sergeant confirmed that the boat hit Molasses Reef near West Caicos. Of the 124 people who were rescued, 102 were male; 22 were female. Several severely injured migrants were helicoptered to a hospital in Providenciales. Many were brought ashore aboard small boats, whilst five migrants were located alive and well after seemingly having swum to safety.

The incident was reported to the United States Coast Guard by authorities from Turks and Caicos. A spokesperson for the Coast Guard said they rescued 113 migrants and were assisting in the search for those who were still missing. He said they were "hopeful" of finding more missing migrants alive but that "it has been a night and we have not located any additional people". A helicopter and a cutter were also sent by the United States.

An investigation was started to determine the cause. The boat had no motor. Hubert Hughes, Turks and Caicos Deputy Police Commissioner, claimed police had not been chasing the boat and only assisted when it became apparent that it had gotten into trouble.

Haitians were immediately repatriated. The incident followed the interception of 124 Haitian migrants from what was described as a "grossly overloaded" boat travelling southwest of this shipwreck. Those migrants were quickly returned to Haiti.

== See also ==
- 2009 Libya migrant shipwreck
- Haitian immigration to the United States and Canada
- Illegal immigration to the United States
