= Grand Turk Lighthouse =

Lighthouse on Grand Turk Island, Turks and Caicos Islands

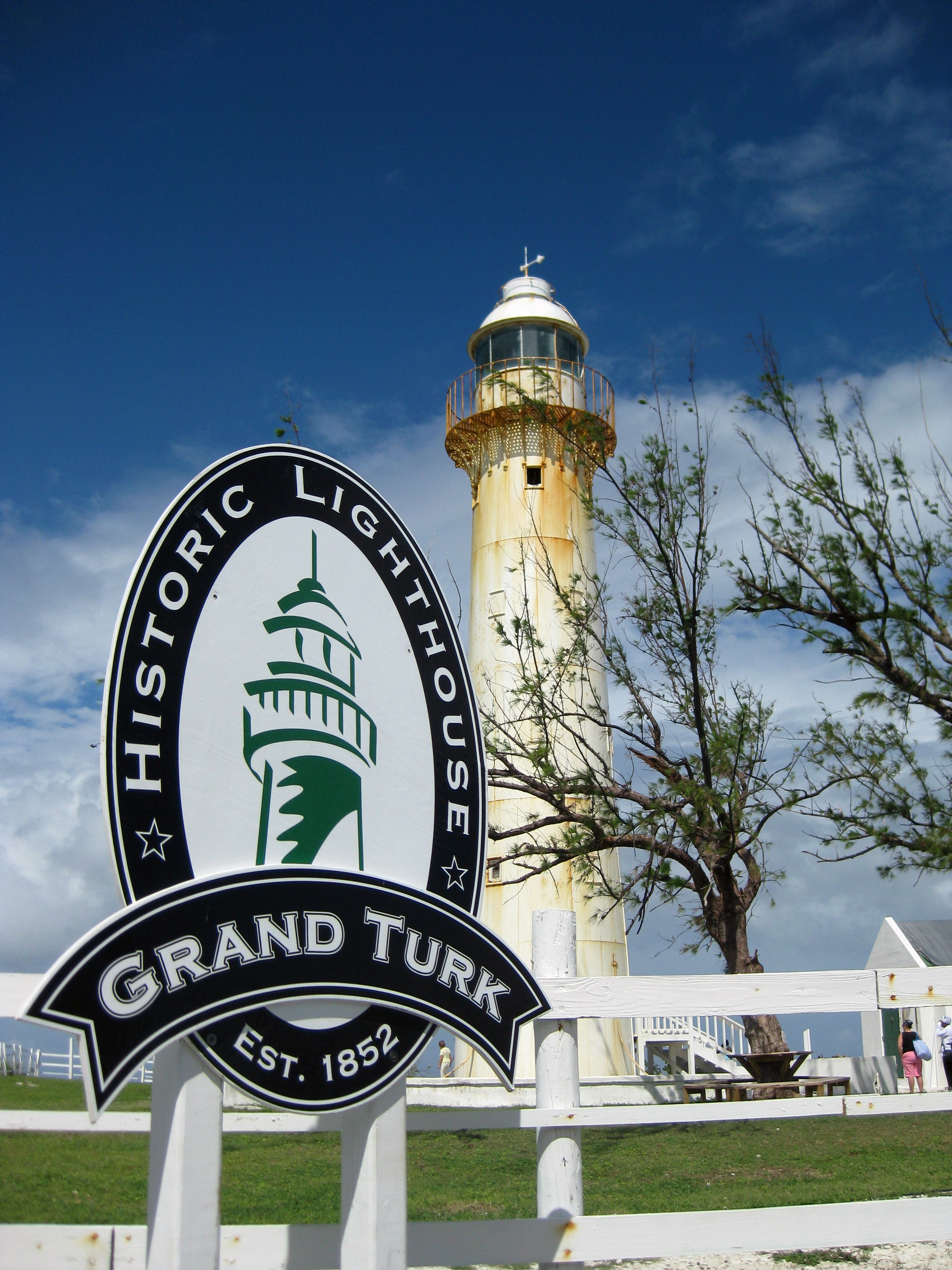
- Grand Turk Lighthouse
- Location: Grand Turk Island; Turks and Caicos Islands
- Coordinates: 21.511677°N 71.133602°W

Tower
- Constructed: 1852
- Construction: cast iron tower
- Automated: 1972
- Height: 18 metres (59 ft)
- Shape: tapered cylindrical tower with balcony and lantern
- Markings: white tower and lantern
- Operator: Turks and Caicos National Trust

Light
- Focal height: 33 metres (108 ft)
- Lens: Fresnel lens
- Range: 18 nautical miles (33 km; 21 mi)
- Characteristic: Fl W 7.5s.

Grand Turk Lighthouse is a lighthouse on Grand Turk, Turks and Caicos Islands. The 60-foot-tall (18 m) structure, overlooking North Creek, was completed by British architect Alexander Gordon in 1852 to alert sailors of the shallow reef. Brighter kerosene lamps and a more powerful Fresnel lens were added by the Chance brothers in 1943 and remained in use until 1972 when the lighthouse was electrified. Today, the lighthouse and lighthouse keeper's house are a historic site under the protection of the National Trust.

== Location ==
The structure is located on Lighthouse Road on the coast of Grand Turk. It is situated on a small limestone hill overlooking the shallow reef that extends from the northern end of the island. The building and an attached kerosene storage house overlook North Creek. This creek is said to closely resemble the description that Christopher Columbus gave for the first island he stumbled upon in the search of the New World in 1492. Donkey trails lead from the lighthouse to the beach beneath the bluff. Mangrove trees on the coast nearby help prevent erosion by retaining the sand.

== History ==
A Mr. Frith secured the building of the island's first modern lighthouse in 1852, saving the island's salt trade, which had waned when vessels stopped arriving due to difficulty with navigation. It was designed by the architect Alexander Gordon to alert sailors of the shallow reef. Constructed in the United Kingdom, it was shipped in pieces to the island. In its heyday, a lighthouse keeper stayed all night at the lighthouse to monitor the lamps and slept during the day in the small keeper's house at the side.

The still functional lighthouse site is often referred to as Grand Turk Historic Lighthouse Park. The lighthouse and lighthouse keeper's house are a historic site under the protection of the National Trust. A view point for watching whales tourists come to lighthouse hill in February and March.

== Description ==
The lighthouse is a white-washed structure made of cast-iron, measuring 60 feet (18 m). It initially had eight small Argand oil lamps, with reflectors magnifying the light by 450 times, driven by weights and machinery. The reflectors were constructed by Devill & Company of London in 1851. As the original lamps were not powerful, on dark, turbulent nights they could often not be seen, which led to shipwrecks off the coast even after the lighthouse had been established. Brighter kerosene lamps and a more powerful Fresnel lens were added by the Chance Brothers of Birmingham, England in 1943 which improved the situation. In 1972, the lighthouse was electrified and provides a bright beacon light to guide ships. The original lens is now on display in the Turks and Caicos National Museum. The guard rail at the top is rusting due to age from the elements. The guard's house is where the guard would keep awake in the night to refill oil and kerosene lamps so that they would not get extinguished due to lack of oil. This house has small windows, likely designed to restrict light entering the building so that the guard could sleep more peacefully during full daylight.

== See also ==
- List of lighthouses in the Turks and Caicos Islands
