= Highbourne Cay Wreck =

Shipwreck in the Bahamas

Coordinates: 24°44′11″N 76°49′10″W

The Highbourne Cay Shipwreck is the site of a ship which wrecked in the Bahamas early in the 16th century. It is one the oldest wrecks of a European ship in the Americas to have been scientifically excavated.

== Discovery ==
The wreck was discovered in 1965 by sport divers off Highbourne Cay in the north of the Exuma island chain. Numerous artifacts were taken from the wreck site, many of them making their way to the United States, before the site could be surveyed effectively, with the loss of much historical information. In 1983 the Institute of Nautical Archaeology (INA) conducted a survey, which included the excavation of a ballast mound, which revealed much detail about the construction and dimensions of the wreck. It was then re-covered to protect the remains from the elements.

In 2013 another excavation was carried out by graduate students from Texas A&M University, adding much knowledge of the ship and of shipbuilding in the Age of Discovery.

== Scientific excavation ==
Beneath the ballast mound the remains of the ships keel, timbers, floor timbers and mast-post were found and recorded. The ship was found to be about 19 metres long with a beam of 5 to 5.5 metres and bore similarities to the Molasses Reef ship, which had been excavated by the INA in 1982.

== Artifacts ==
Over a dozen artillery pieces, plus breech chambers and shot, have ben recovered from the wreck, mostly during the 1960s. These include two bombardetas(es) (a type of long gun) and 13 versos (swivel guns) with compatible breech chambers and the wedges to secure them. The shot is of different sizes, ranging from 3.5 to 6.3 cm in diameter.

The expeditions this century have also recovered three anchors distant from the wrecksite, the largest of which is believed to have been the sheet anchor, rigged as a bower.

== Origin and age ==
The identity of the ship is unknown, though Bahamian writer Eric Wiberg has speculated that the ship was part of a fleet of four under Juan Ponce de Leon, wrecked in 1513 while returning from his expedition to Florida. This ship, piloted by Diego Minuelo, is reported to have taken shelter in the islands, when it dragged its anchor and was wrecked.
