= Cockburn Town =

Capital of Turks and Caicos Islands, United Kingdom

- Capital
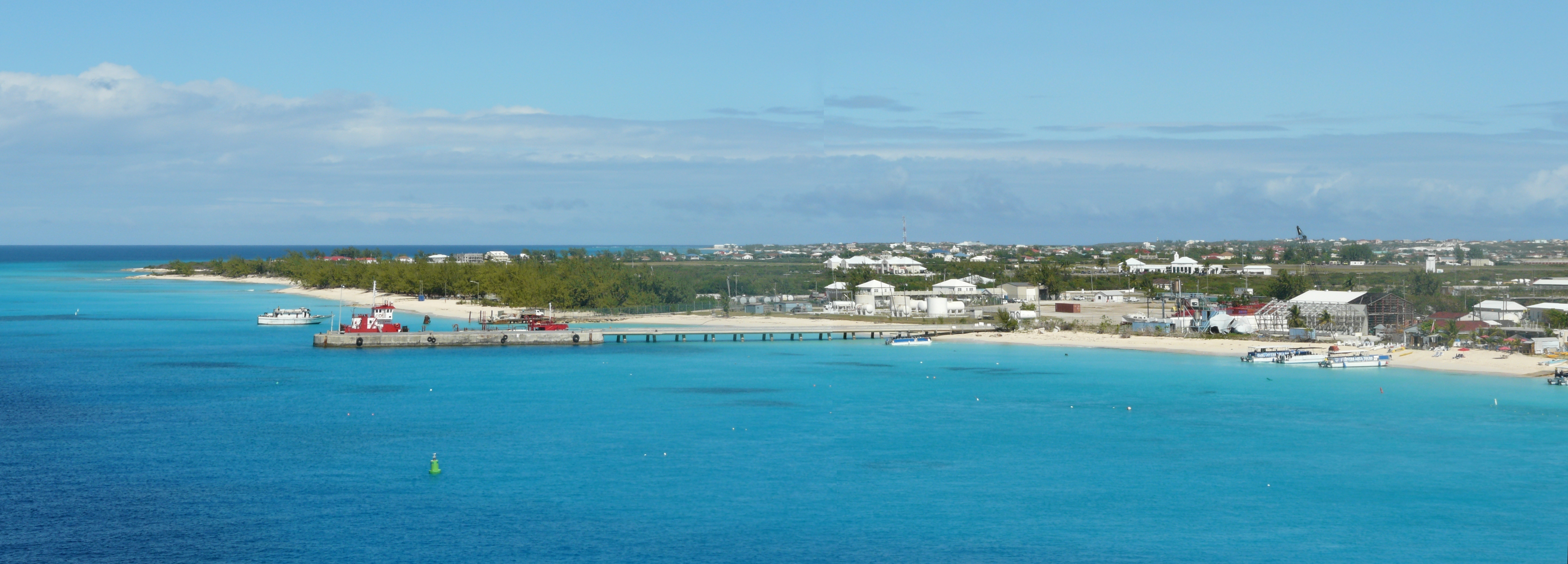
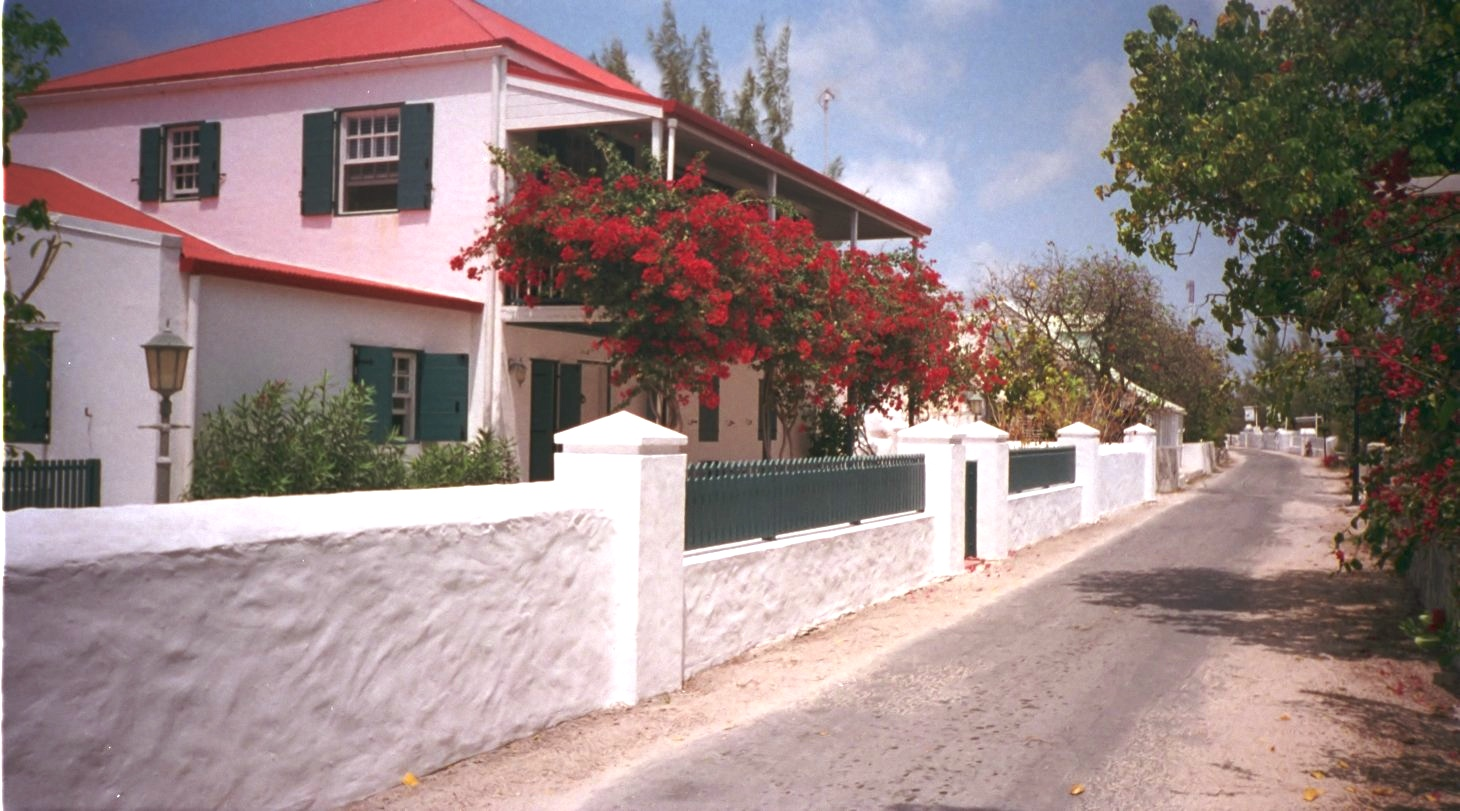
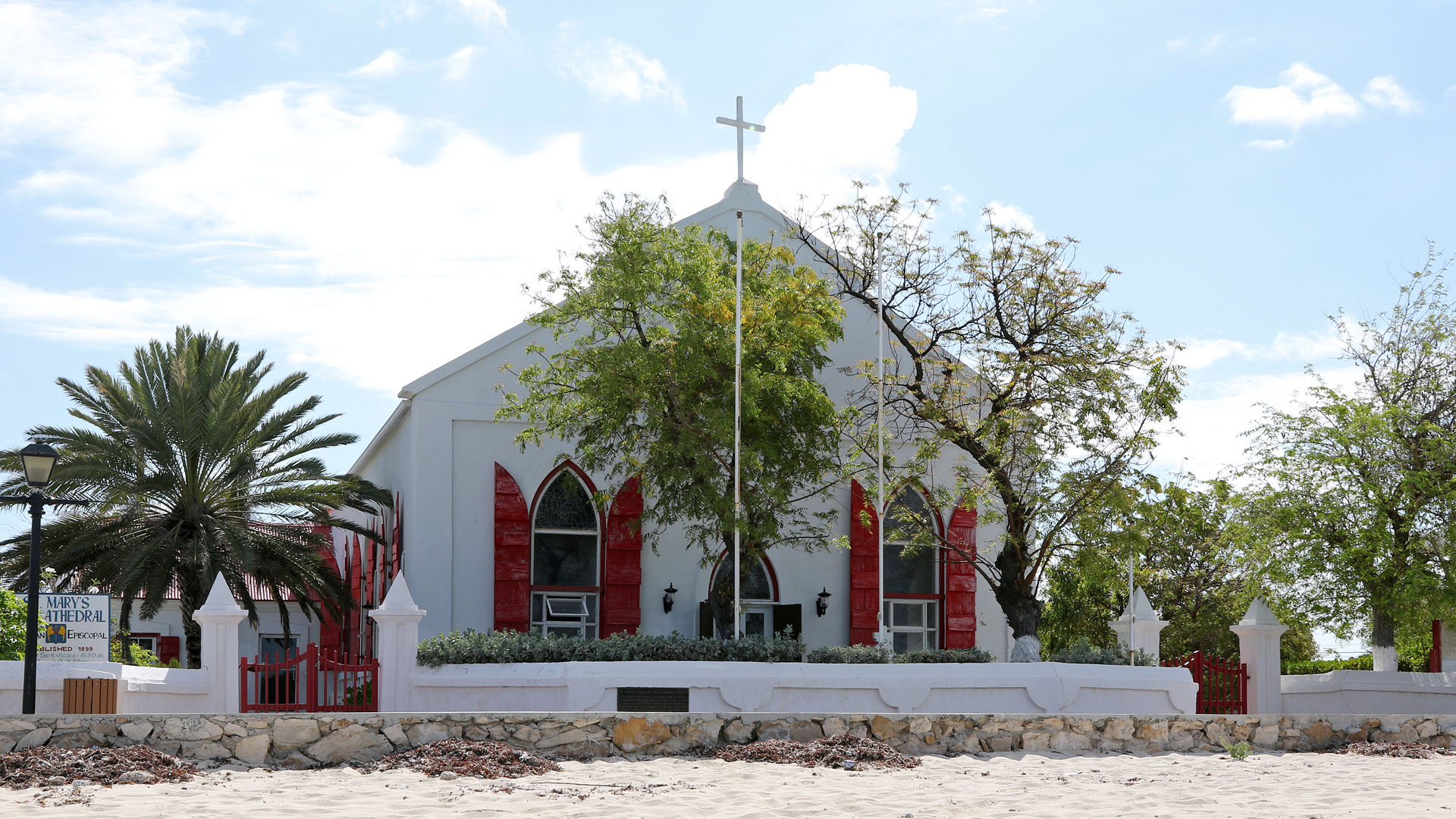
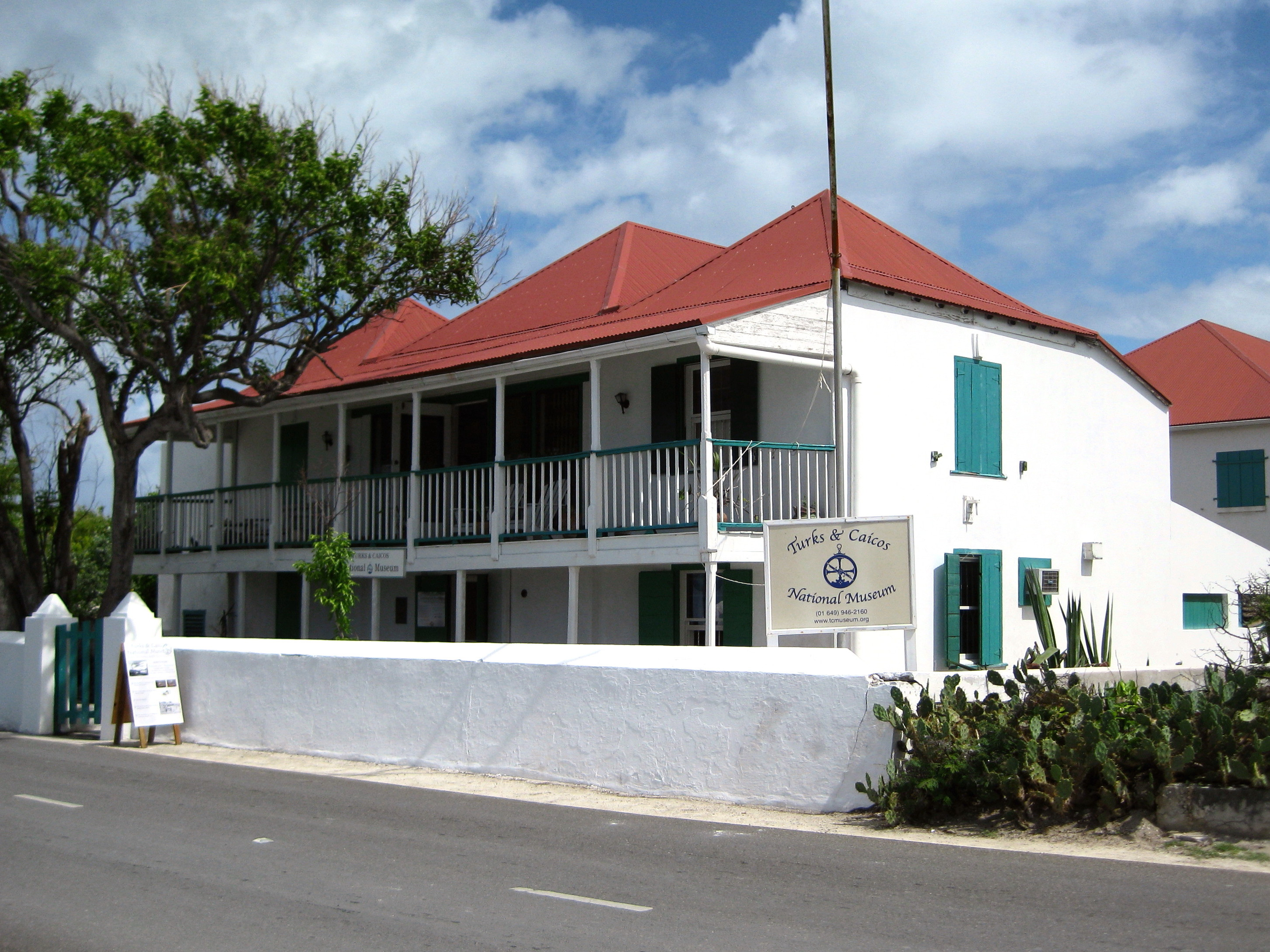
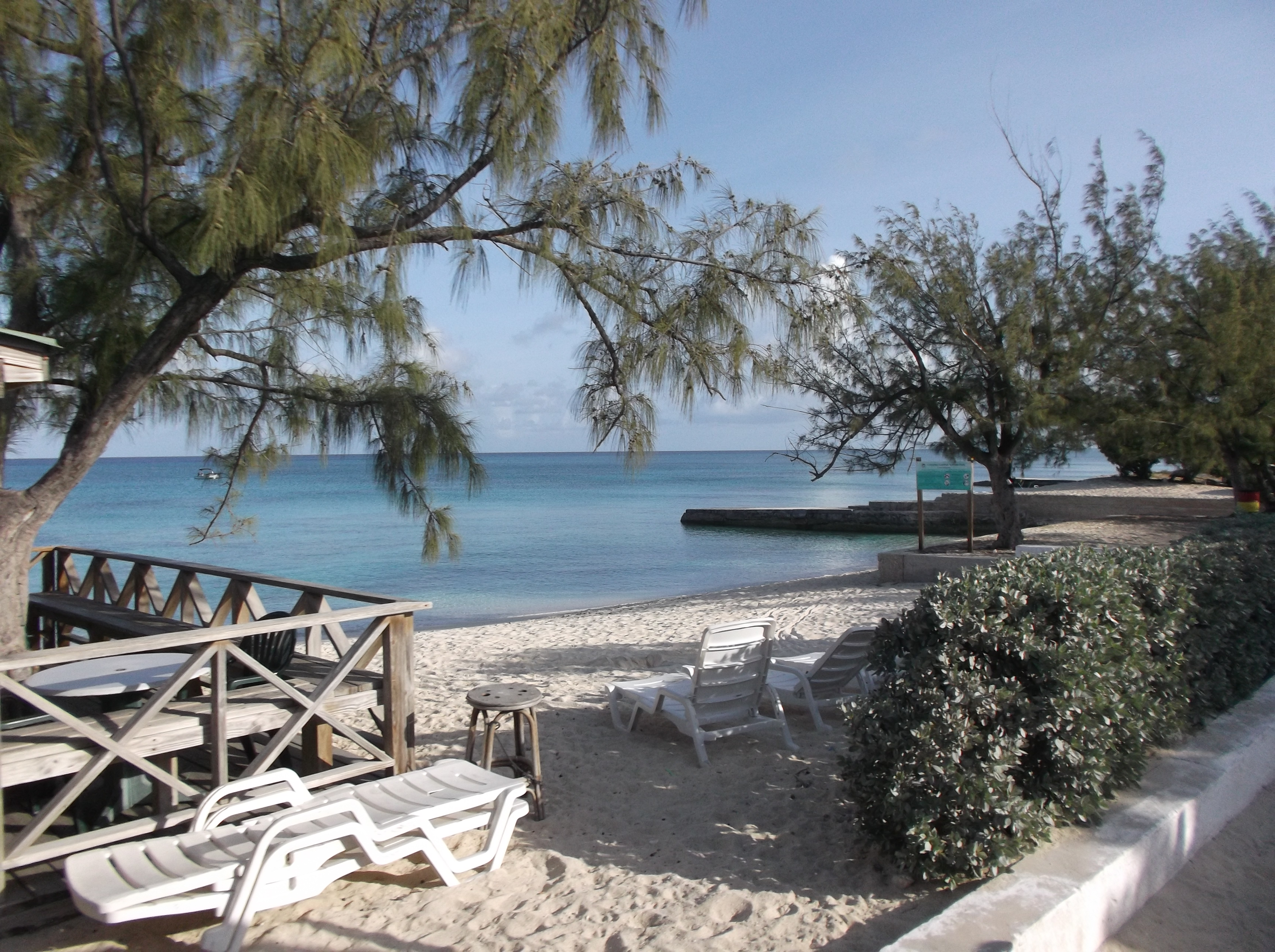
- Top: Aerial view of Cockburn Town; Middle:Downtown Cockburn Town, St. Mary's Cathedral; Downtown Turks & Caicos Island National Museum, Cockburn Town coastline

- Location within Turks and Caicos Islands Location within North America
- Coordinates: 21.459°N 71.139°W
- Country: United Kingdom
- Overseas territory: Turks and Caicos Islands
- District: Grand Turk
- Founded: 1681

Area
  - Town: 6.71 sq mi (17.39 km^{2})

Population
  - Town: 3,700
- Time zone: UTC-04:00 (AST)
- Climate: BSh

Cockburn Town (/ˈkoʊbərn/ KOH-bərn) is the capital of the Turks and Caicos Islands, spreading across most of Grand Turk. It was founded in 1681 by salt collectors.

== Geography ==
Cockburn Town is located on the largest island in the Turks Islands archipelago, Grand Turk. Historic 18th and 19th century Bermudian architecture lines Duke and Front Streets in the town. The town is known for its long, narrow streets and old street lamps.

The closest anchorage to Cockburn Town is Hawk's Nest Anchorage, which, though sheltered, should only be entered in good light because of reefs near the entrance.

== History ==
The seat of government ever since 1766, Cockburn Town was the first permanent settlement on any of the islands, founded in 1681 by salt collectors who arrived in the Turks and Caicos Islands. The city supposedly lies on the place where Juan Ponce de León first landed on the island. It is named for Francis Cockburn, former Governor of the Bahamas. The town reportedly has ties to the Burrowes family (now located in Australia) whose proclivity aided the naming of the town.

== Main sights ==
=== National Museum ===
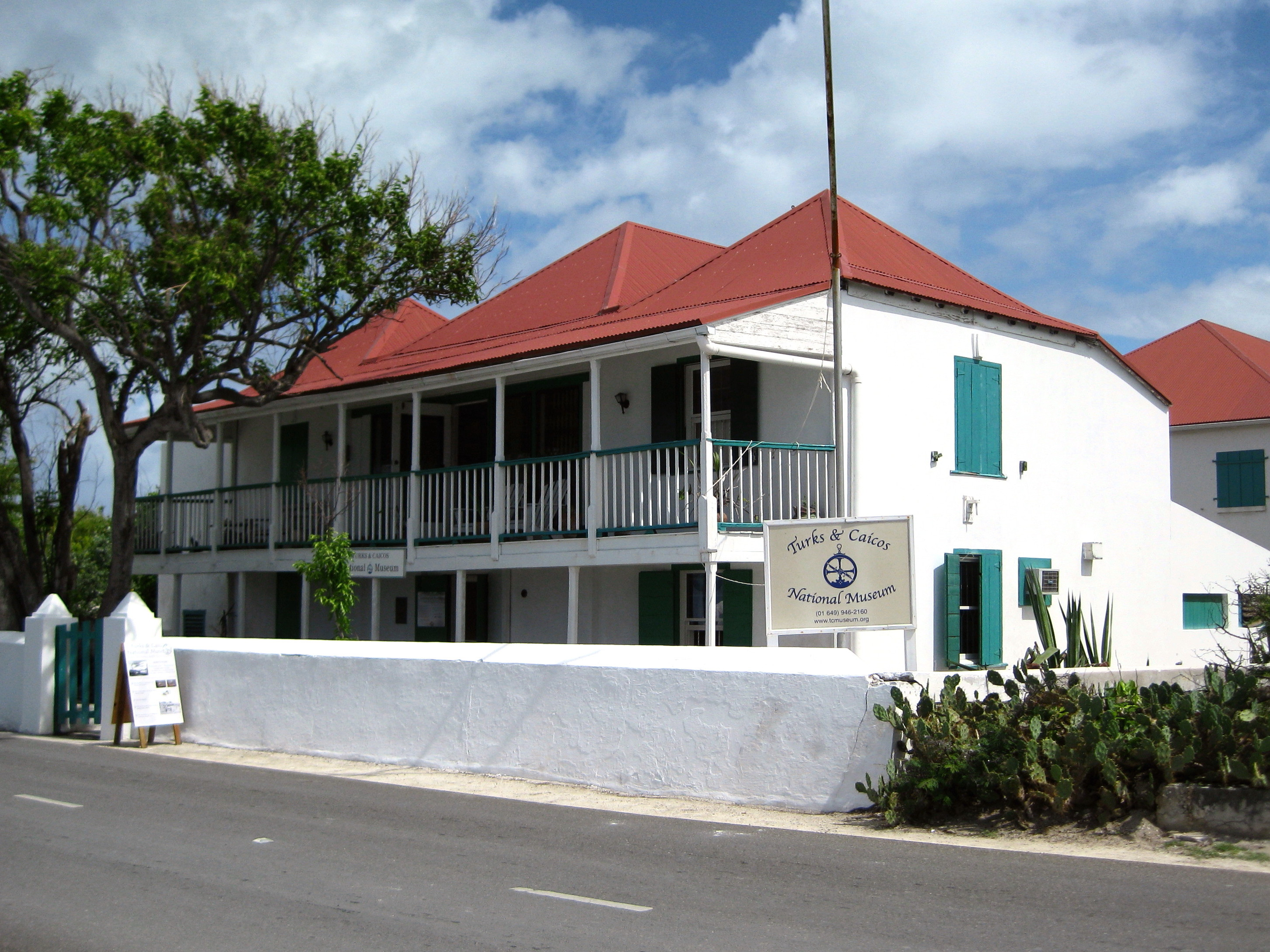
National Museum on Front Street

Cockburn Town is home to the Turks & Caicos National Museum, which is housed in the colonial-era Guinep House, on Front Street. The house is believed to be over 180 years old and much of its structural material came from local shipwrecks, including a ship's mast, which is one of the building's main supports. The site was donated to the Museum in 1990.

Among the National Museum's collections is an exhibit of shipwrecks, including the oldest known European shipwreck in the Americas, the Molasses Reef Wreck, dated 1505.

Other exhibits detail the history of the Lucayans, the Space Race, Turks and Caicos postage stamps, slavery and the history of the slave trade, the sisal and salt industries, royal events, as well as a general history of the islands. The museum also maintains a garden, which is adjacent to the Guinep House.

Also of interest are the museum's research projects, including its Message in a Bottle Project, recording nearly 40 years' worth of messages to wash upon the shores of Grand Turk.

=== Her Majesty's Prison ===
"Her Majesty's Prison" on Pond Street was built in the 1830s and remained in operation until 1994. In addition to the main cell block and offices for prison officials, it hosts a bell tower and its own museum.

== Climate ==
Grand Turk has a hot semi-arid climate (Köppen BSh) with summer-like weather occurring all year round and a rainier season from September to December when the northeastern trade winds are strongest and hurricanes common.

Climate data for Grand Turk
Month	Jan	Feb	Mar	Apr	May	Jun	Jul	Aug	Sep	Oct	Nov	Dec	Year
Mean daily maximum °C (°F)	25.2 (77.4)	25.0 (77.0)	24.9 (76.8)	25.5 (77.9)	26.5 (79.7)	27.7 (81.9)	28.1 (82.6)	28.4 (83.1)	28.5 (83.3)	28.0 (82.4)	26.9 (80.4)	26.0 (78.8)	26.7 (80.1)
Daily mean °C (°F)	24.6 (76.3)	24.5 (76.1)	24.4 (75.9)	25.0 (77.0)	26.0 (78.8)	27.2 (81.0)	27.6 (81.7)	27.9 (82.2)	27.9 (82.2)	27.4 (81.3)	26.3 (79.3)	25.5 (77.9)	26.2 (79.1)
Mean daily minimum °C (°F)	24.0 (75.2)	23.9 (75.0)	23.8 (74.8)	24.4 (75.9)	25.3 (77.5)	26.6 (79.9)	26.9 (80.4)	27.2 (81.0)	27.1 (80.8)	26.6 (79.9)	25.6 (78.1)	24.9 (76.8)	25.5 (77.9)
Average precipitation mm (inches)	25.6 (1.01)	12.6 (0.50)	15.0 (0.59)	18.9 (0.74)	41.7 (1.64)	27.0 (1.06)	46.6 (1.83)	62.3 (2.45)	79.0 (3.11)	61.6 (2.43)	54.0 (2.13)	31.5 (1.24)	475.8 (18.73)
Source: Weather.Directory

== Education ==
The sole high school is HJ Robinson High School.

== See also ==
- Grand Turk Parade Ground
