= Grand Turk Island =

Island in the Turks and Caicos Islands

Grand Turk
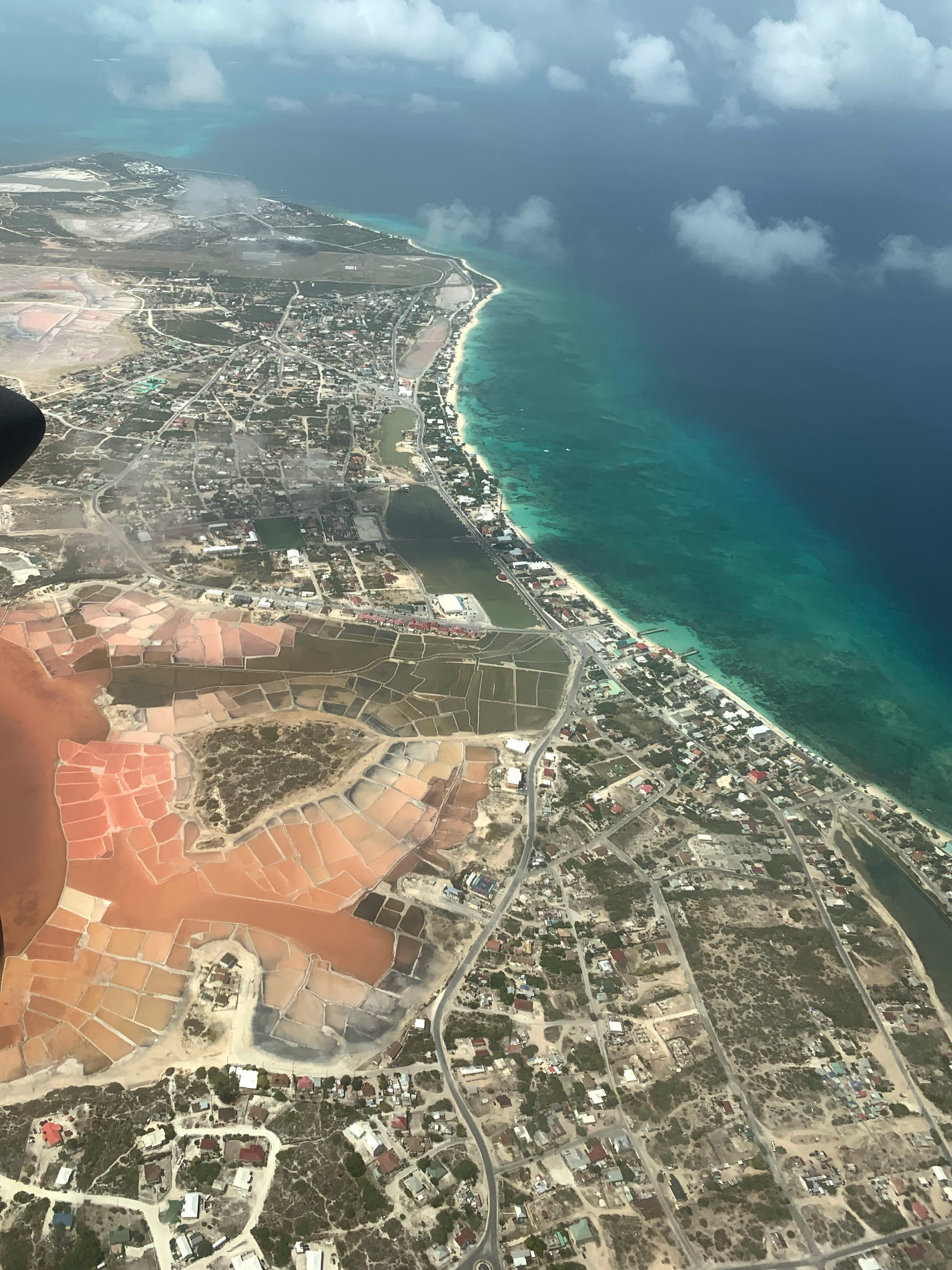
- Grand Turk as seen from the air, from midway on the island and looking south. The large reddish area is a remnant salina, a local name for the artificial ponds used to extract salt from sea water through evaporation.

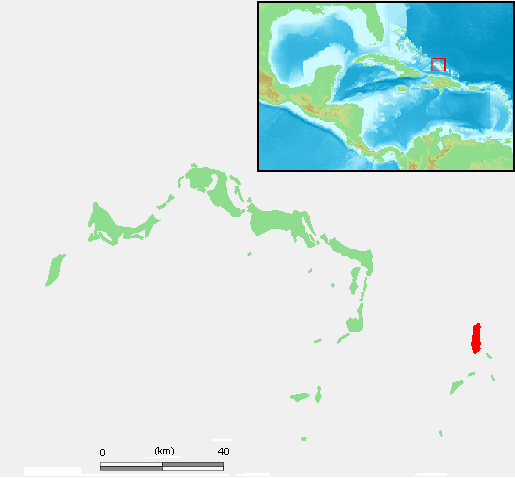
- The location of Grand Turk within the Turks and Caicos Islands

- Location within Turks and Caicos Islands Location within the Caribbean

Geography
- Location: Atlantic Ocean
- Coordinates: 21°28′20″N 71°08′20″W
- Archipelago: Lucayan Archipelago
- Area: 18 km^{2} (6.9 sq mi)

Administration
- United Kingdom
- British Overseas Territory: Turks and Caicos Islands
- Largest settlement: Cockburn Town
- Monarch: Charles III

Demographics
- Population: 4,831 (2012)
- Pop. density: 206.67/km^{2} (535.27/sq mi)

Additional information
- Time zone: EST (UTC-5)
  - Summer (DST): EDT (UTC-4)
- ISO code: TC

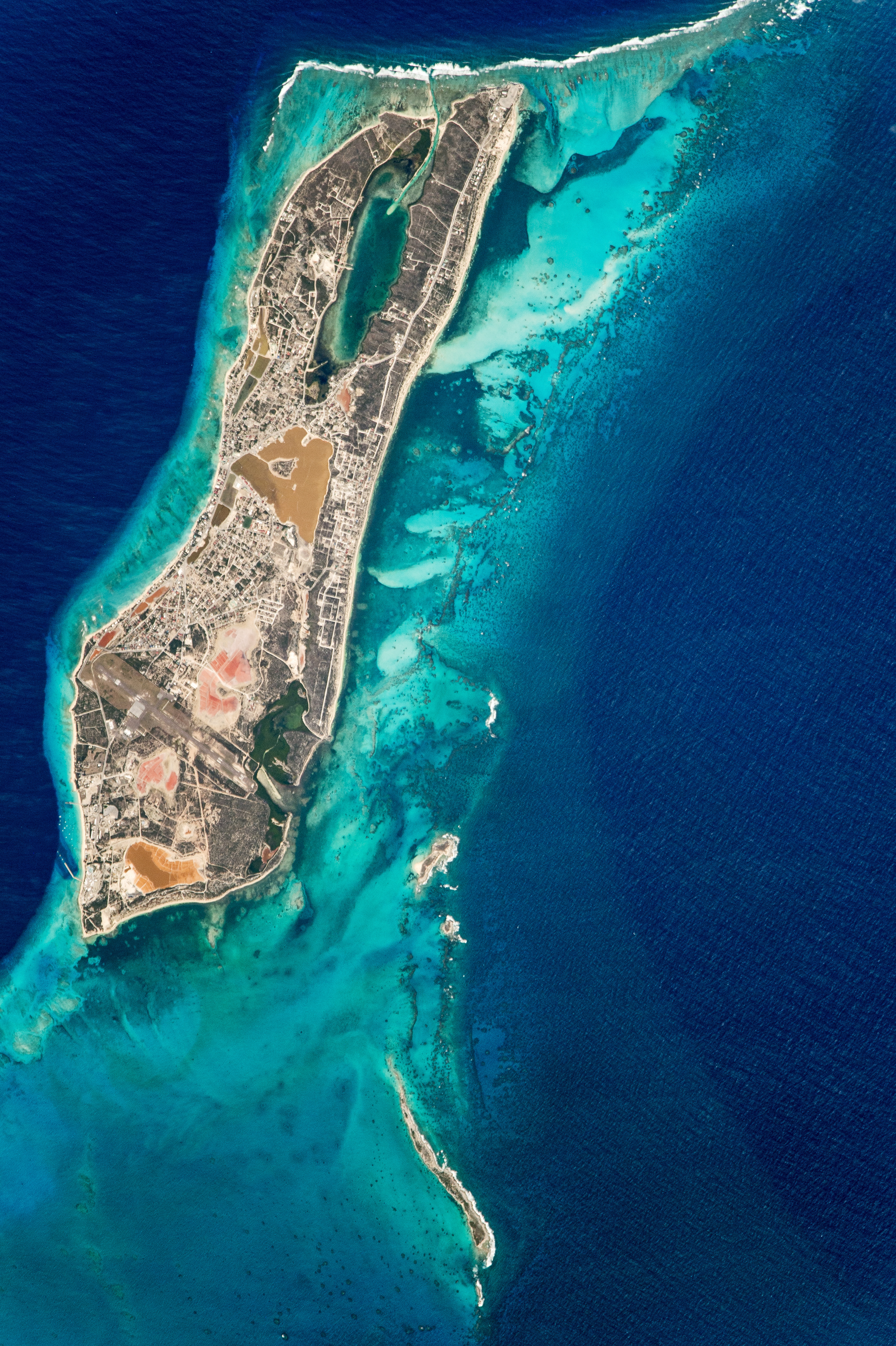
Grand Turk as seen from space

Grand Turk is an island in the Turks and Caicos Islands, a British Overseas Territory, tropical islands in the Lucayan Archipelago of the Atlantic Ocean and northern West Indies. It is the largest island in the Turks Islands (the smaller of the two archipelagos that make up the island territory) at 18 km^{2} (6.9 sq mi). Grand Turk contains the territory's capital, Cockburn Town, and the JAGS McCartney International Airport. The island is the administrative, historic, cultural and financial centre of the territory and has the second-largest population of the islands at approximately 4,831 people in 2012.

== Etymology ==
The name comes from a species of cactus on the island, the Turk's cap cactus (Melocactus intortus), which has a distinctive cap, reminiscent of an Ottoman fez. In addition, this interpretation of the name received a reaction in the Turkish press on the grounds that it was anachronism. Fez began to be used by the Ottoman Turks in the 19th century, and the "Turk" in the island's name dates back to very old times.

== History ==
The Lucayan people were the indigenous people of the island, who called it Abawana, meaning "the First Small Land". The Spanish later called it Amuana.

Grand Turk was first colonised in 1681 by Bermudians, who set up the salt industry in the islands. For some time, at least until the early 19th century, Grand Turk was often referred to as Grand Cay.

In 1754 HMS Jamaica and HMS Shoreham voyaged through the Windward Passage stopping at the islands along the way, searching for evidence of French settlements. While they found no French inhabitants on Grand Turk, they did find "Marks of Possession". The marks were described as "Crosses and large posts erected, to which were affixed copper plates, whereon were engraved the French King's Arms, and an inscription to this effect, 'The Continuation of the Possession of Lewis XIVth, King of France, 1553.'" The British cut down the Marks of Possession, and to prevent any violence towards the Bermudians, Captain Julian Legge, thought to leave a declaration should the French return. "To prevent any violence being used to any of the people who live on Grand Key, Salt Key, or Seal Key, it is thought proper to leave this Declaration, that we cut down the Arms of the most Christian King, and the Crosses that were set up as Marks of Possession on the said Islands, and carried the same away, pursuant to instructions for so doing: And further, that his Britannick Majesty will not suffer any Marks of Possession to be put up, on any of the Keys or Islands known by the name of Turk's Islands. Dated the 21st of January, 1754."

According to Captain Hunt after his visit to the island in August 1764, the French constructed, "Monuments of 80 feet high, one of which is on the Grand Key, and the other on the Sand Key." On 22 August HMS Jamaica and HMS Venus visited the island, "...they found a monument or column erected, 10 feet wide at the base, and 60 feet high, built of brick and soft mortar, with a square piece of marble fixed therein bearing this inscription, 'Homines as deos nulla re proprius accedunt quam Salutem Hominibus dando' [Men approach the gods in no way more proper than by giving Salutation to Men]; and over it, 'Phare de Choiseul' [Choiseul Lighthouse], in large letters of iron." Since it was determined the pillar could not be used in "Service to Trade and Naviation", and was believed it was to serve as a Mark of Possession it was undermined and destroyed within two hours. The pillar on Sand Key was believed it might be in service to shipping and was left standing. It was later learned both monuments were, "...erected with no other view than for the general Good of Mankind, and for the Preservation of Shipping."

In 1766 it became the capital of the country. In April 1767 it was reported Governor Seymour began planning the development of a city on the island by the name "Shelburne".

On Tuesday 24 September 1813 the island was hit by a hurricane which, "...totally destroyed above 120 dwelling-houses."

Captain John C. Blackler of the brig Washington, reported after leaving Grand Turk on 12 September 1815 he and his crew came across nine survivors from the ship William and Nancy which had been destroyed in a hurricane on 31 August.

The brig Panopea of Baltimore, ran aground on the reef surrounding Grand Turk the night of 24 December 1824. The crew was rescued, along with 1100 barrels of flour.

On 19 August 1828 the vessel William Mason was totally lost on Grand Turk, but the crew was saved.

To aid British shipping, in September 1836, Britain declared Grand Turk a free port for the warehousing of goods.

The British ship Fasque was lost on 3 July 1838 on the island. The crew and part of the cargo was saved.

On 23 May 1842 RMS Medina was lost on the reef on the north end of the island.

On 16 August 1846 the brig Madrid of Philadelphia wrecked on Grand Turk and was a total loss.

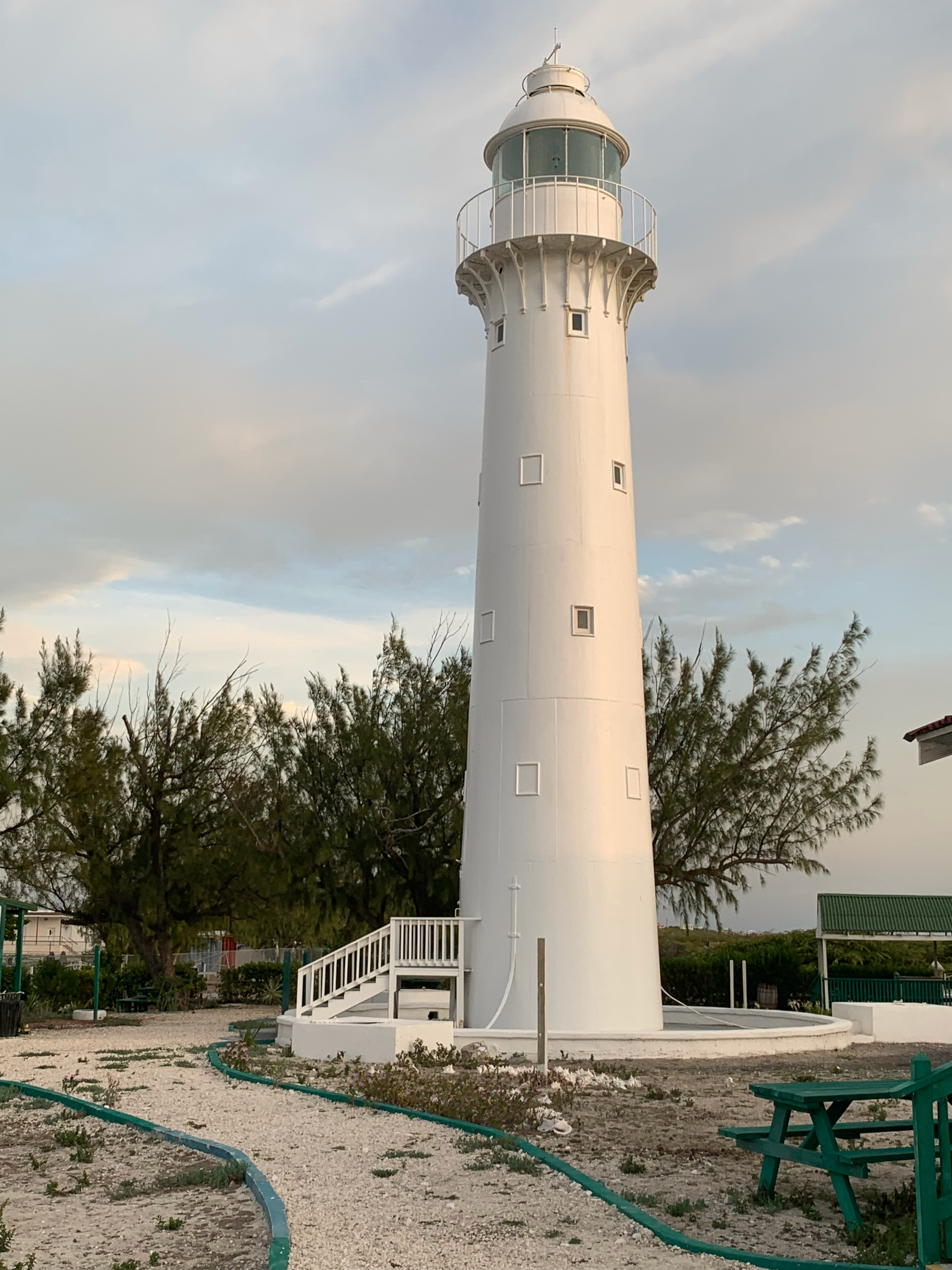
Grand Turk's lighthouse, on the northeastern tip of the island

=== Grand Turk Lighthouse ===
In was announced in November 1841, the intention to build six lighthouses on the "Turk's Island Passage". In 1851 it was announced the imperial government had granted £2000 towards the erection of a lighthouse on Grand Turk. The construction was set to be undertaken by the Ordnance Department.

Grand Turk Lighthouse was erected in 1852 near northern end of the island. The 60 ft (18 m) lighthouse was designed by Alexander Gordon and built by Chance Brothers in England. It was shipped in pieces and assembled on Grand Turk. The lighthouse was reported to be completed on 1 October 1852.

=== Tourism and cruise industry ===
Starting in the 1950s, Turks and Caicos began looking to entice the burgeoning tourism business to the islands. In 1956 the island passed an ordnance authorising an exemption from customs duties and tonnage tax of materials for use in building and equipping hotels. In the 1970s an advertising push began marketing the islands to Americans in the hope of drawing their attention. In 1977 round trip fares from Miami to Grand Turk were offered starting at $150. The Minister of tourism, Liam McGuire said, "[the beaches] may not be perfect, but they put a lot of others in the shade."

In 1978 the company West Pacific Land Development Corp. began negotiating with Turks and Caicos to construct a casino on Grand Turk. The country turned to the UK for help in drawing up gambling legislation and supervision. At the time, the only gambling permitted was the use of slot machines.

In 2004 Carnival Cruise Line and Grand Turk, Chief Minister Michael Misick, announced the company would be building a $35 million cruise port on the island.

== Columbus landfall theory ==
Grand Turk has been put forward as the possible landfall island of Christopher Columbus during his first voyage to the New World in 1492. San Salvador Island or Samana Cay in the Bahamas is traditionally identified with Guanahani, the site of Columbus' first landfall, but some believe that studies of Columbus' journals show that his descriptions of Guanahani much more closely fit Grand Turk than they do other candidates. Magnetic variations that caused misreadings in Columbus' compasses demonstrate that several of the recorded moorings using a rope-secured anchor to a clear sandy bottom would not have been possible had Columbus sailed from the islands of the Bahamas. In addition, the latitudes recorded in Columbus' diary place the landfall island at 90 nautical miles (100 mi; 170 km) from Hispaniola, too close for the Bahamas, but almost exactly the distance from Grand Turk.

On the contrary, historian Gregory McIntosh has concluded that Grand Turk was not Guanahani but Babueca, an island separately discovered by Martín Alonso Pinzón in November - December 1492.

== Climate ==
Grand Turk has a hot semi-arid climate (Köppen: BSh).

Climate data for Grand Turk
Month	Jan	Feb	Mar	Apr	May	Jun	Jul	Aug	Sep	Oct	Nov	Dec	Year
Mean daily maximum °C (°F)	25.2 (77.4)	25.0 (77.0)	24.9 (76.8)	25.5 (77.9)	26.5 (79.7)	27.7 (81.9)	28.1 (82.6)	28.4 (83.1)	28.5 (83.3)	28.0 (82.4)	26.9 (80.4)	26.0 (78.8)	26.7 (80.1)
Daily mean °C (°F)	24.6 (76.3)	24.5 (76.1)	24.4 (75.9)	25.0 (77.0)	26.0 (78.8)	27.2 (81.0)	27.6 (81.7)	27.9 (82.2)	27.9 (82.2)	27.4 (81.3)	26.3 (79.3)	25.5 (77.9)	26.2 (79.1)
Mean daily minimum °C (°F)	24.0 (75.2)	23.9 (75.0)	23.8 (74.8)	24.4 (75.9)	25.3 (77.5)	26.6 (79.9)	26.9 (80.4)	27.2 (81.0)	27.1 (80.8)	26.6 (79.9)	25.6 (78.1)	24.9 (76.8)	25.5 (77.9)
Average precipitation mm (inches)	25.6 (1.01)	12.6 (0.50)	15.0 (0.59)	18.9 (0.74)	41.7 (1.64)	27.0 (1.06)	46.6 (1.83)	62.3 (2.45)	79.0 (3.11)	61.6 (2.43)	54.0 (2.13)	31.5 (1.24)	475.8 (18.73)
Source: Weather.Directory

== U.S. Military presence ==
=== Naval Facility Grand Turk ===
A U.S. Naval Facility (NAVFAC), the name given for a shore terminus of an offshore surveillance array of the Sound Surveillance System (SOSUS), was established on Grand Turk in 1954 as one of three additional Atlantic systems installed that year during the first phase of SOSUS installation. The facility was commissioned 23 October 1954 and was active until decommissioned 31 March 1980. The actual undersea surveillance mission of the system and shore facility remained classified through decommissioning. The NAVFAC was located (21°30′43.6″N 71°07′57.7″W) near the Grand Turk Lighthouse.

=== Missile Impact Location System ===
Grand Turk, located about 700 nmi (810 mi; 1,300 km) from Cape Canaveral, became the first down range tracking facility of the U.S. Air Force's Eastern Range to have a Missile Impact Location System (MILS) target array to detect the splash down location of test missile nose cones. The next target arrays down range were located at 1,300 nmi (1,500 mi; 2,400 km) at Antigua and at 4,400 nmi (5,100 mi; 8,100 km) at Ascension Island. In addition to the precise target array the facility was the terminus of one of the Broad Ocean Area (BOA) MILS that could give good location data over large ocean areas.

=== Other installations and events ===
From 1957 to 1959 USN Mobile Construction Battalion 7 constructed a LORAN Station on the island.

In 1962, John Glenn's Friendship 7 Mercury spacecraft landed in the vicinity of Grand Turk off the southeast shoreline. A replica of the Friendship 7 is on display in Grand Turk at the entrance to the Grand Turk airport.

In 1966 at least five Arcas (All-Purpose Rocket for Collecting Atmospheric Soundings) sounding rockets were launched from Grand Turk by the USA.

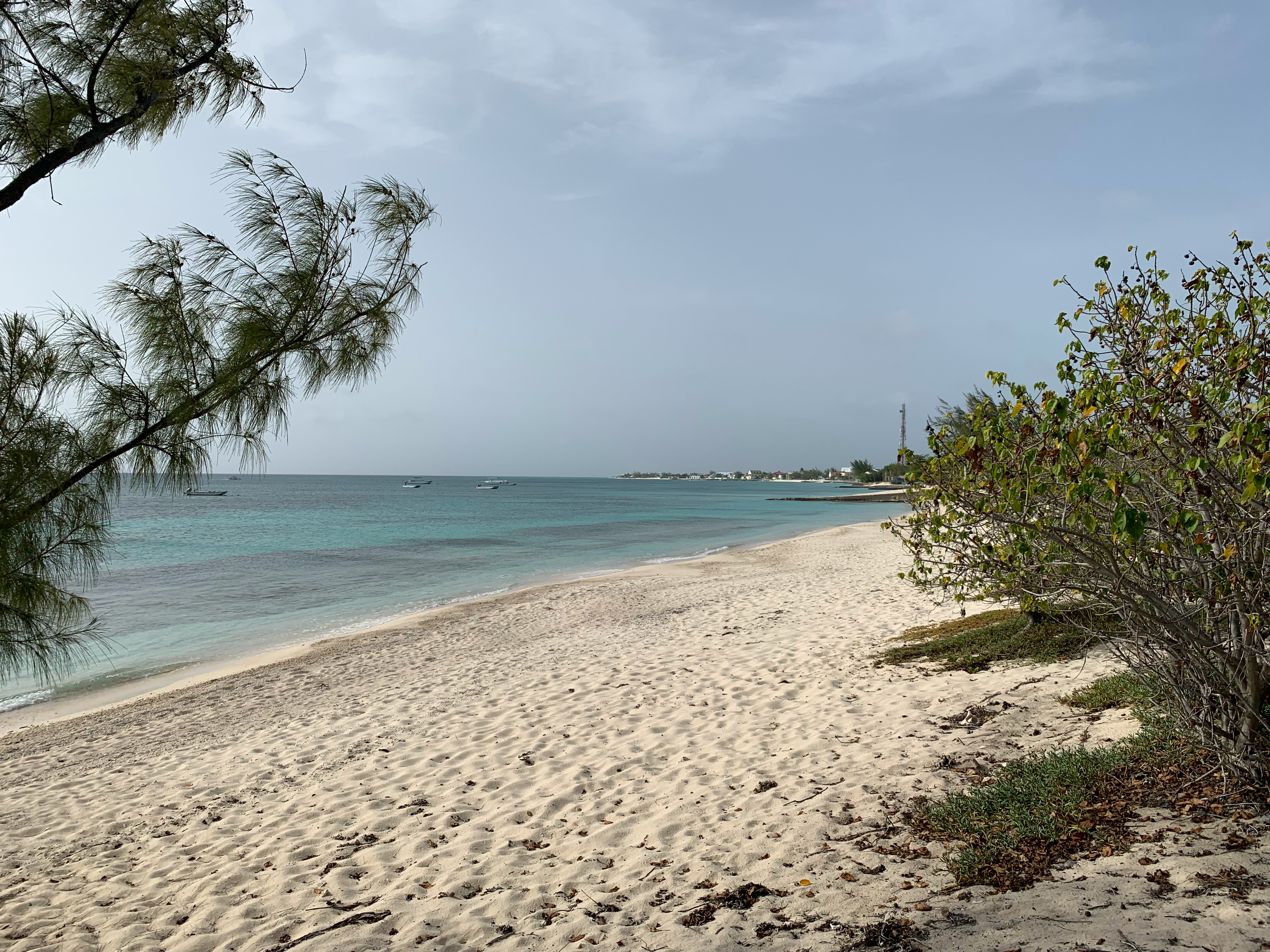
Looking north along Cockburn Town Beach, near the south end of Duke St.

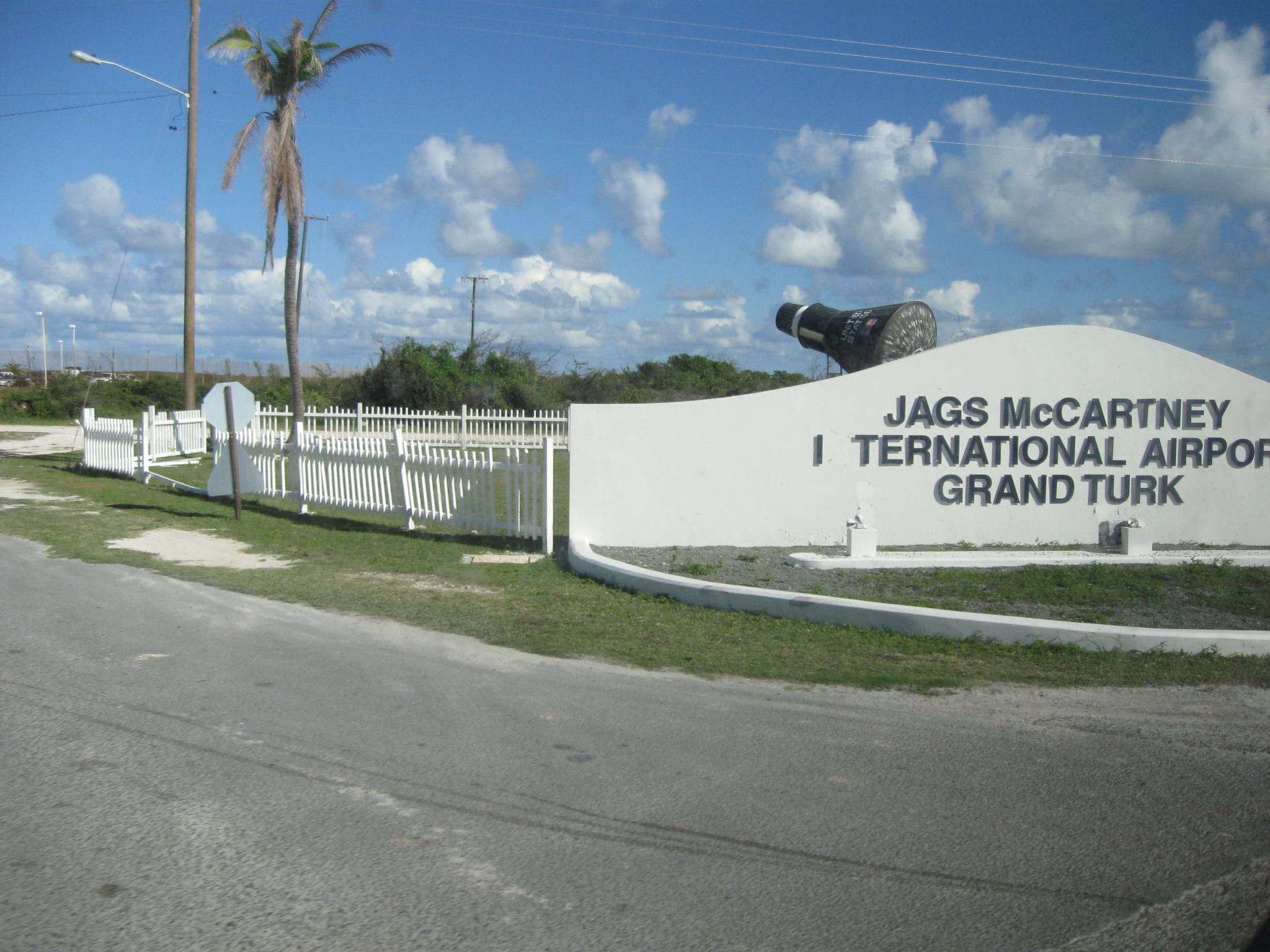
Replica of the Friendship 7

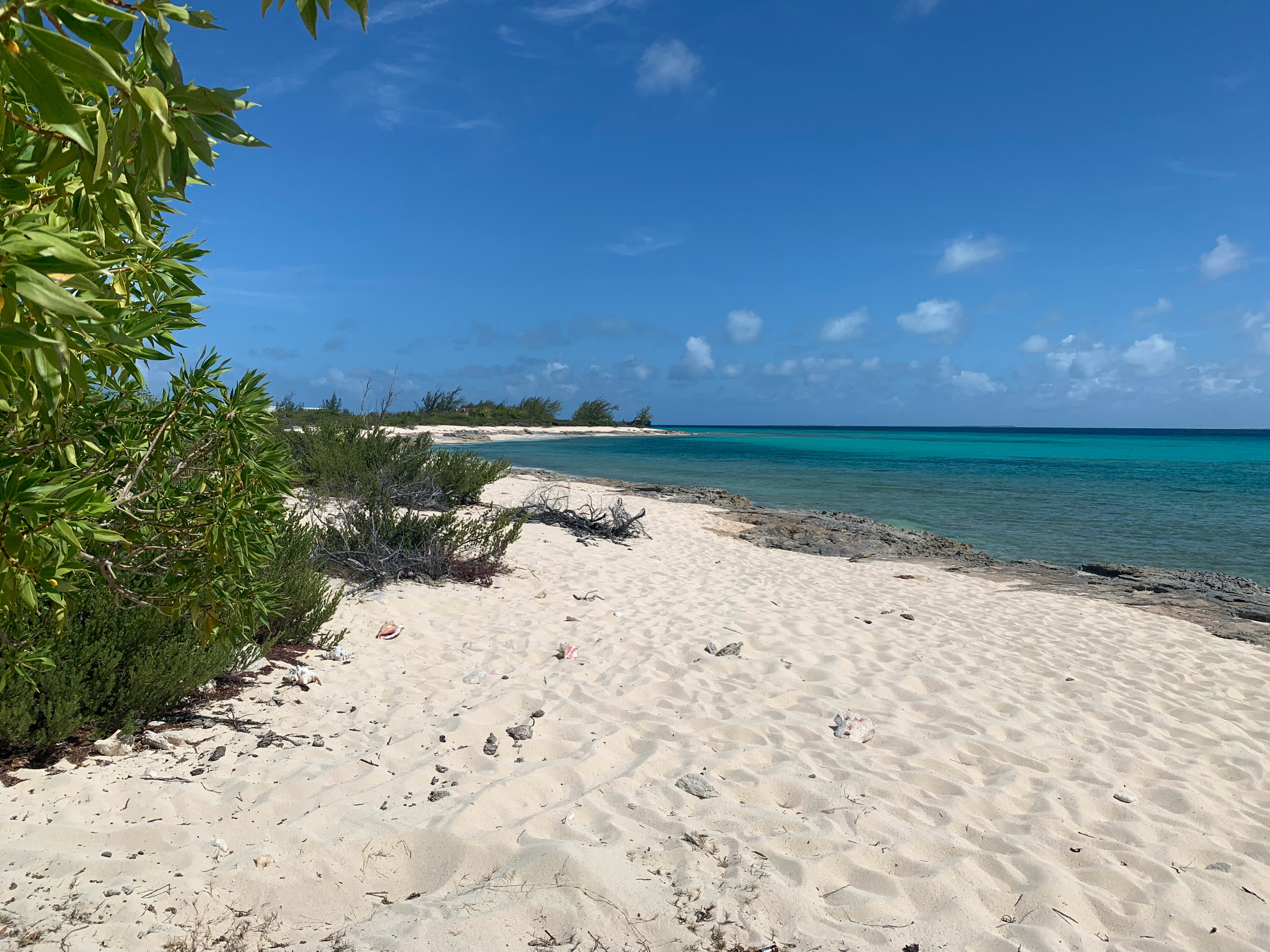
Looking east at Columbus Landfall Beach, near JAGS McCartney International Airport

== See also ==
- Grand Turk Parade Ground
