= Molasses Reef Wreck =

Shipwreck in the Turks and Caicos Islands

Coordinates: 21°33′03″N 72°16′52″W

The Molasses Reef Shipwreck is the site of a ship which wrecked in the Turks and Caicos Islands early in the 16th century. It is the oldest wreck of a European ship in the Americas to have been scientifically excavated.

== Discovery ==
In 1976, unlicensed treasure hunters discovered a wreck on Molasses Reef, on the southwestern edge of the Caicos Bank near French Cay. The site of the wreck has been described as a "ship trap". The remains of several other wrecks are scattered on top of and around the earliest wreck. The treasure hunters, who were looking for Spanish treasure ships, recognized that the ordnance in the wreck was from the 1490s or early 1500s, too early for a treasure ship. In 1980, a salvage company organized by those treasure hunters applied for a license from the government of the Turks and Caicos Islands to explore and salvage shipwrecks. After receiving the license, the company announced that it had discovered the wreck of Christopher Columbus' ship Pinta, and anticipated making large profits from marketing artifacts from the Pinta and other wrecks of treasure ships in the area. Concerned about the salvage company's plans, the Turks and Caicos Islands government invited the Institute of Nautical Archaeology at Texas A&M University to survey the wreck site. Later a new group arrived in the Turks and Caicos Islands, claiming to have inherited the rights of the earlier salvage company. After receiving permission to explore wrecks other than the Molasses Reef wreck, but not to remove any artifacts, this group proceeded to take artifacts without permission from numerous sites, including Molasses Reef. The government then revoked the company's salvage license, and invited the Institute of Nautical Archaeology to excavate the Molasses Reef Wreck.

== Scientific excavation ==
When researchers from the Institute of Nautical Archaeology returned to Molasses Reef in 1982 they discovered that extensive damage had occurred since the earlier survey. Someone had used pipe bombs to dislodge artifacts from the wreck, leaving a large crater and damaged artifacts. Over the next three years the archaeologists spent a total of six months excavating the site. They shipped more than ten tons of artifacts to Texas for cleaning, stabilization and study. Responsibility for the wreck and artifacts was transferred to a non-profit entity, Ships of Exploration and Discovery Research, which was set up by the archaeologists working on the project. In 1990 all of the artifacts were returned to the Turks and Caicos Islands and placed in a new National Museum, opened in 1991, housing displays about the wreck.

== Origin and age ==
While only a very small portion of the wooden hull had survived, the archaeologists were able to determine the size and some of the structure of the ship from the distribution of ballast stones and from marks made in the sea floor by parts of the hull that had disintegrated since the wreck. The ship was about 19 meters long with a beam of five to six meters and a draft of two meters or a bit more. The ship had at least three masts; metal parts of rigging found indicate that both square-rigged and lateen sails were used on the ship. The surviving parts of the hull showed construction techniques typical of 15th- and 16th-century Portuguese and Spanish ships. This and the relatively small size suggest that this ship was a caravel. The age of the wreck indicates that the ship was built in Spain or Portugal and sailed across the Atlantic. The ballast was found to consist of stones from several points of origin, primarily from near Lisbon, but also from one or more of the Macaronesian islands (the Azores, Madeira and/or the Canary Islands) and from near Bristol, England.

An attempt was made to date the wreck by analyzing growth rings on a large coral head growing on the wreck, but the coral was found to be only 250 years old. Artifacts found at the wreck site included items typically carried on Spanish ships in the late 15th and early 16th centuries. Haquebuts, a type of arquebus, which ceased being part of a Spanish ship's usual equipment after about 1515, and a type of bowl called melado escudilla (literally, "honey bowl"), which stopped being used after about 1520, were found in the wreck. Other types of artifacts which were commonly carried on Spanish ships later in the 16th century were not found at the wreck site. This evidence indicates that the ship probably wrecked within a few years of 1513. The Highbourne Cay wreck (Note: The Highbourne Cay Wreck (also known as the Highborne Cay wreck, with other variations of the placename existing) is located in the Bahamas. It is estimated from the ballast pile to be about 200 tons burden and is relatively lightly built. Excavation into the ballast pile revealed a well-preserved section of the ship's hull, including the step for the mainmast and the master frame. Work on the site was delayed by a Hurricane Irma and, later, by Covid travel restrictions, but is continuing.) is of similar date; between them, these two sites represent the earliest archaeologically investigated wrecks of European ships in the Americas.

== Artifacts ==
A large number of arms, including cannons and small arms, bowls and storage jars, surgical and carpentry tools, as well as wooden pieces of the hull and metal pieces from the rigging, have been recovered from the wreck. Arms on the ship included two bombardettas, fifteen versos (a type of breech-loading swivel gun), haquebuts, haquebuzes (a smaller type of arquebus), grenades, crossbows and quarrels, swords, daggers, breech chambers (powder cartridges) for the bombardetas and versos, shot molds, and sheets of lead to be melted as needed to make shot. The wreck also contained many pot sherds from a variety of tinajas (olive jars), escudillas (bowls) and lebrillos (basins) of styles typical of Spanish and Portuguese pottery of the late 15th and early 16th centuries. Some more crudely made vessels of uncertain provenance were also found.

== Mission ==
The ship that wrecked on Molasses Reef has not been identified despite extensive searches of records. Over 120 European ships are known to have been lost in the Americas by 1520, but none of them can be matched to the Molasses Reef Wreck. The lack of personal possessions in the wreck indicates that the crew was able to abandon ship, but there are no signs that the Spanish tried to salvage the armament on the ship. Four sets of bilboes were found at the wreck site. The bilboes may have been for use in punishing crew members, but they were also used to restrain slaves aboard ships. The ship may have been hunting for Lucayans in the Bahama Islands (in the broader sense that includes the now politically separate Turks and Caicos Islands) to take to Hispaniola as slaves (technically, as workers in the encomienda system). As the natives of Hispaniola died out, the Spanish recruited Lucayans to replace them. By 1513 almost all of the Lucayans had been removed from the southern Bahama Islands. This would accord with a wreck date no later than 1513.
