= List of airports in the Turks and Caicos Islands =

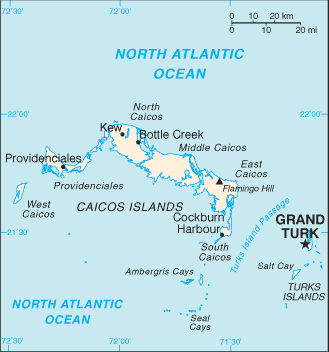
Map of Turks and Caicos Islands

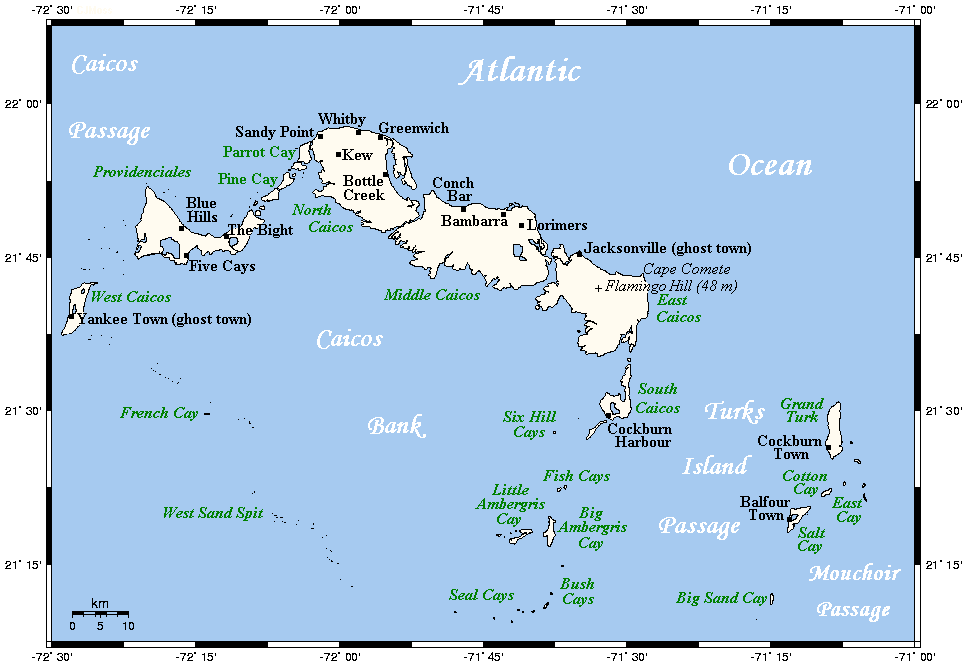

This is a list of airports in the Turks and Caicos Islands, sorted by location. The Turks and Caicos Islands are a British Overseas Territory located southeast of Mayaguana in the Bahamas and north of the island of Hispaniola. It consists of two groups of sub-tropical islands in the West Indies, the larger Caicos Islands and the smaller Turks Islands. The total population is about 36,000, of whom approximately 22,500 live on Providenciales in the Caicos Islands. Cockburn Town, the capital, is on Grand Turk Island.

== Airports ==
Names shown in bold indicate the airport has scheduled passenger service on commercial airlines.

Island	ICAO	IATA	Airport name	Coordinates
Ambergris Cay (Caicos Islands)	MBAC		Harold Charles International Airport	21°18′2″N 71°38′28″W
Grand Turk Island (Turks Islands)	MBGT	GDT	**JAGS McCartney International Airport**	21°26′40″N 071°08′32″W
Middle Caicos (Caicos Islands)	MBMC	MDS	Middle Caicos Airport	21°49′33″N 071°48′09″W
North Caicos (Caicos Islands)	MBNC	NCA	**North Caicos Airport**	21°55′03″N 071°56′22″W
Pine Cay (Caicos Islands)	MBPI	PIC	Pine Cay Airport	21°52′29.88″N 72°5′32.69″W
Providenciales (Caicos Islands)	MBPV	PLS	**Providenciales International Airport**	21°46′25″N 72°15′57″W
Salt Cay (Turks Islands)	MBSY	SLX	Salt Cay Airport	21°20′N 071°12′W
South Caicos (Caicos Islands)	MBSC	XSC	**Norman B. Saunders Sr. International Airport**	21°30′57″N 071°31′43″W
West Caicos (Caicos Islands)	MB01		West Caicos Aerodrome	21°39′9″N 072°27′57.6″W

== See also ==
- List of airports by ICAO code: M#MB - Turks and Caicos Islands
- List of airports in the United Kingdom and the British Crown Dependencies
- Wikipedia: WikiProject Aviation/Airline destination lists: North America#Turks and Caicos Islands (United Kingdom)
