= SkyKing Limited =

Airline

SkyKing
IATA	ICAO	Call sign
RU	SKI	SKYKING
- Founded: 1994
- Ceased operations: 22 October 2008 (merged into Air Turks and Caicos)
- Hubs: Providenciales International Airport
- Secondary hubs: Grand Turk International Airport
- Fleet size: 9 (at closure)
- Destinations: 8 (at closure)
- Key people: Brian Lightbourne (COO
- Website: http://www.skyking.tc (defunct)

SkyKing Limited was a scheduled passenger airline based on the Turks and Caicos Islands.

== History ==
In December 1994, two entrepreneurs from the Turks and Caicos Islands, Harold Charles (a native of Haiti) and John Shearer, joined forces putting together a hangar facility and 2 small piston-engine aircraft to form a small charter airline. The first revenue flight took place in January 1995. In 1996, scheduled services began using a mixed fleet of a total of eight Cessna 400 and Piper PA-23 aircraft, after which larger Short 360 aircraft were added. Over the following years, SkyKing bought some Beechcraft 1900, which eventually became the only aircraft type in the fleet.

In 2008, SkyKing was acquired by rival Air Turks and Caicos. Since 22 October of that year, all SkyKing operations were merged into its new owner. Subsequently, the SkyKing brand was discontinued.

== Destinations ==
At the time of closure, SkyKing operated scheduled flights to the following destinations:

Dominican Republic

- Puerto Plata - Gregorio Luperón International Airport
- Santiago de los Caballeros - Cibao International Airport

Haiti

- Cap-Haïtien - Cap-Haitien International Airport

Jamaica

- Kingston - Norman Manley International Airport

Turks and Caicos Islands

- Grand Turk - JAGS McCartney International Airport secondary hub
- Providenciales - Providenciales International Airport hub
- South Caicos - South Caicos Airport

== Fleet ==
In October 2008, SkyKing operated the following aircraft, which were subsequently integrated into the Air Turks and Caicos fleet.

- 4 Beechcraft 1900
