= List of airlines of the Turks and Caicos Islands =

This is a list of airlines operating in Turks and Caicos Islands.

== Active ==
Airline	Image	IATA	ICAO	Callsign	Founded	Notes
Caicos Express Airways		9Q	CXE	CAICOS	2011	
InterCaribbean Airways		JY	IWY	ISLANDWAYS	2013	
Global Airways					?	

== Defunct ==
Airline	Image	IATA	ICAO	Callsign	Founded	Ceased operations	Notes
Air Turks & Caicos		JY	IWY	KERRMONT	2003	2013	Rebranded as InterCaribbean Airways
Caicos Caribbean Airways		CG			1972	1997	
Caicos International Airways		KJ			1984	1994	
InterIsland Airways		JY	IWY	ISLANDWAY	1991	2003	Rebranded as Air Turks & Caicos
SkyKing Limited		RU	SKI	SKYKING	1994	2008	Merged into Air Turks & Caicos
TCNA		QW	TCI	TURK NATIONAL	1979	2002	

== See also ==
- List of airlines of the Americas
- List of defunct airlines of the Americas
