= List of Spirit Airlines destinations =

This is a list of destinations that Spirit Airlines served prior to its demise on May 2, 2026.

Country (state/province) or territory	City	Airport	Notes	Refs
Aruba	Oranjestad	Queen Beatrix International Airport		
Bahamas	Freeport	Grand Bahama International Airport	Terminated	
Bahamas	Nassau	Lynden Pindling International Airport	Terminated	
Bahamas	San Salvador Island	San Salvador Airport	Terminated	
Belize	Belize City	Philip S. W. Goldson International Airport		
Cayman Islands	Grand Cayman	Owen Roberts International Airport	Terminated	
Colombia	Armenia	El Edén International Airport		
Colombia	Barranquilla	Ernesto Cortissoz International Airport		
Colombia	Bogotá	El Dorado International Airport		
Colombia	Bucaramanga	Palonegro International Airport	Terminated	
Colombia	Cali	Alfonso Bonilla Aragón International Airport		
Colombia	Cartagena	Rafael Núñez International Airport		
Colombia	Medellín	José María Córdova International Airport		
Costa Rica	San José	Juan Santamaría International Airport		
Cuba	Havana	Jose Marti International Airport	Terminated	
Dominican Republic	Punta Cana	Punta Cana International Airport		
Dominican Republic	Santiago	Cibao International Airport		
Dominican Republic	Santo Domingo	Las Américas International Airport		
Ecuador	Guayaquil	José Joaquín de Olmedo International Airport		
El Salvador	San Salvador	El Salvador International Airport	Terminated	
Guatemala	Guatemala City	La Aurora International Airport	Terminated	
Haiti	Cap-Haïtien	Cap-Haïtien International Airport		
Haiti	Port-au-Prince	Toussaint Louverture International Airport		
Honduras	San Pedro Sula	Ramón Villeda Morales International Airport		
Honduras	Tegucigalpa	Comayagua International Airport		
Jamaica	Kingston	Norman Manley International Airport		
Jamaica	Montego Bay	Sangster International Airport		
Mexico (Baja California Sur)	San José del Cabo	Los Cabos International Airport	Terminated	
Mexico (Jalisco)	Puerto Vallarta	Licenciado Gustavo Díaz Ordaz International Airport	Terminated	
Mexico (Quintana Roo)	Cancún	Cancún International Airport		
Mexico (Quintana Roo)	Tulum	Tulum International Airport		
Mexico (State of Mexico)	Toluca	Toluca International Airport	Terminated	
Nicaragua	Managua	Augusto C. Sandino International Airport	Terminated	
Panama	Panama City	Tocumen International Airport	Terminated	
Peru	Lima	Jorge Chávez International Airport	Seasonal	
Puerto Rico	Aguadilla	Rafael Hernández Airport	Terminated	
Puerto Rico	Ponce	Mercedita International Airport	Terminated	
Puerto Rico	San Juan	Luis Muñoz Marín International Airport		
Sint Maarten	Philipsburg	Princess Juliana International Airport		
Trinidad and Tobago	Port-of-Spain	Piarco International Airport	Terminated	
Turks and Caicos Islands	Grand Turk Island	JAGS McCartney International Airport	Terminated	
Turks and Caicos Islands	Providenciales	Providenciales International Airport	Terminated	
United States (Alabama)	Birmingham	Birmingham–Shuttlesworth International Airport	Terminated	
United States (Arizona)	Phoenix	Phoenix Sky Harbor International Airport	Terminated	
United States (Arizona)	Phoenix	Phoenix–Mesa Gateway Airport	Terminated	
United States (California)	Burbank	Hollywood Burbank Airport		
United States (California)	Los Angeles	Los Angeles International Airport		
United States (California)	Oakland	Oakland San Francisco Bay Airport	Terminated	
United States (California)	Sacramento	Sacramento International Airport	Terminated	
United States (California)	San Diego	San Diego International Airport	Terminated	
United States (California)	San Jose	San Jose International Airport	Terminated	
United States (California)	Santa Ana	John Wayne Airport		
United States (Colorado)	Denver	Denver International Airport	Terminated	
United States (Connecticut)	Hartford	Bradley International Airport	Terminated	
United States (District of Columbia)	Washington, D.C.	Ronald Reagan Washington National Airport	Terminated	
United States (Florida)	Fort Lauderdale	Fort Lauderdale–Hollywood International Airport	Base	
United States (Florida)	Fort Myers	Southwest Florida International Airport		
United States (Florida)	Jacksonville	Jacksonville International Airport	Terminated	
United States (Florida)	Melbourne	Melbourne Orlando International Airport	Terminated	
United States (Florida)	Miami	Miami International Airport	Base	
United States (Florida)	Orlando	Orlando International Airport	Base	
United States (Florida)	Pensacola	Pensacola International Airport		
United States (Florida)	Tampa	Tampa International Airport		
United States (Florida)	West Palm Beach	President Donald J. Trump International Airport		
United States (Georgia)	Atlanta	Hartsfield–Jackson Atlanta International Airport	Base	
United States (Georgia)	Savannah	Savannah/Hilton Head International Airport		
United States (Idaho)	Boise	Boise Airport	Terminated	
United States (Illinois)	Chicago	O'Hare International Airport	Base	
United States (Indiana)	Indianapolis	Indianapolis International Airport		
United States (Kentucky)	Louisville	Louisville Muhammad Ali International Airport		
United States (Louisiana)	New Orleans	Louis Armstrong New Orleans International Airport		
United States (Maryland)	Baltimore	Baltimore/Washington International Airport		
United States (Massachusetts)	Boston	Logan International Airport		
United States (Michigan)	Detroit	Detroit Metropolitan Wayne County Airport	Base	
United States (Minnesota)	Minneapolis/Saint Paul	Minneapolis–Saint Paul International Airport	Terminated	
United States (Missouri)	Kansas City	Kansas City International Airport		
United States (Missouri)	St. Louis	St. Louis Lambert International Airport	Terminated	
United States (Nevada)	Las Vegas	Harry Reid International Airport	Base	
United States (Nevada)	Reno/Tahoe	Reno–Tahoe International Airport		
United States (New Hampshire)	Manchester	Manchester–Boston Regional Airport	Terminated	
United States (New Jersey)	Atlantic City	Atlantic City International Airport		
United States (New Jersey)	Newark	Newark Liberty International Airport	Base	
United States (New Mexico)	Albuquerque	Albuquerque International Sunport	Terminated	
United States (New York)	Islip	Long Island MacArthur Airport	Terminated	
United States (New York)	New York City	LaGuardia Airport		
United States (New York)	Niagara Falls	Niagara Falls International Airport	Terminated	
United States (New York)	Plattsburgh	Plattsburgh International Airport	Terminated	
United States (New York)	Rochester	Greater Rochester International Airport	Terminated	
United States (North Carolina)	Asheville	Asheville Regional Airport	Terminated	
United States (North Carolina)	Charlotte	Charlotte Douglas International Airport		
United States (North Carolina)	Greensboro/High Point	Piedmont Triad International Airport	Terminated	
United States (North Carolina)	Raleigh/Durham	Raleigh–Durham International Airport		
United States (Ohio)	Akron/Canton	Akron–Canton Airport	Terminated	
United States (Ohio)	Cleveland	Cleveland Hopkins International Airport	Terminated	
United States (Ohio)	Columbus	John Glenn Columbus International Airport		
United States (Oregon)	Portland	Portland International Airport	Terminated	
United States (Pennsylvania)	Latrobe	Arnold Palmer Regional Airport		
United States (Pennsylvania)	Philadelphia	Philadelphia International Airport		
United States (Pennsylvania)	Pittsburgh	Pittsburgh International Airport		
United States (Rhode Island)	Providence	Rhode Island T. F. Green International Airport	Terminated	
United States (South Carolina)	Charleston	Charleston International Airport		
United States (South Carolina)	Columbia	Columbia Metropolitan Airport	Terminated	
United States (South Carolina)	Myrtle Beach	Myrtle Beach International Airport		
United States (Tennessee)	Chattanooga	Chattanooga Metropolitan Airport	Terminated	
United States (Tennessee)	Memphis	Memphis International Airport		
United States (Tennessee)	Nashville	Nashville International Airport		
United States (Texas)	Austin	Austin–Bergstrom International Airport		
United States (Texas)	Dallas/Fort Worth	Dallas Fort Worth International Airport	Base	
United States (Texas)	Houston	George Bush Intercontinental Airport	Base	
United States (Texas)	San Antonio	San Antonio International Airport		
United States (Utah)	Salt Lake City	Salt Lake City International Airport	Terminated	
United States (Virginia)	Norfolk	Norfolk International Airport		
United States (Virginia)	Richmond	Richmond International Airport		
United States (Washington)	Seattle/Tacoma	Seattle–Tacoma International Airport	Terminated	
United States (Wisconsin)	Milwaukee	Milwaukee Mitchell International Airport	Terminated	
United States (West Virginia)	Charleston	Yeager Airport	Terminated	
United States Virgin Islands	St. Thomas	Cyril E. King Airport		
United States Virgin Islands	St. Croix	Henry E. Rohlsen Airport		
