= Tourism in the Turks and Caicos Islands =

Resorts on Grace Bay, Providenciales

Tourism in the Turks and Caicos Islands is an industry that generates more than 1 million tourist arrivals per year, and is the main source of revenue for the country.

The Tourism Industry in the Turks and Caicos Islands was formally established in the early 1970s, following a 1969 research tour commissioned by the Legislative Assembly and the creation of the Turks and Caicos Tourist Board in 1970. This was followed by the development of the country’s first major resort, Club Med Turquoise, in the late 1970s.

The opening of a cruise port on Grand Turk in 2006 resulted in a significant increase in tourism arrivals to the country.

Tourist arrivals of 2024 in %

== The Founding of Turks and Caicos Tourism and the Role of Hon. Norman B. Saunders ==
In 1969, following a decision by the Legislative Assembly to explore alternatives to reduce the Turks and Caicos Islands' financial reliance on the British Government, Hon. Norman B. Saunders and John Wainwright conducted a regional research tour to study tourism development models. The two visited several Caribbean territories, including The Bahamas, Barbados, the British Virgin Islands, and Martinique. Their report recommended the pursuit of tourism as a strategic economic industry, citing its potential for job creation and increased government revenue.

Based on this report, the House of Assembly established the Turks and Caicos Tourist Board in 1970, appointing Saunders as its first Executive Chairman. Saunders led the board’s efforts to promote tourism and crafted a long-term vision for high-end, low-density development. He advocated for what he termed “up-market” or “first-class tourism,” aiming to attract affluent visitors who would support five-star accommodations with minimal strain on local resources.

Saunders’ leadership helped define the early direction of tourism policy in the Turks and Caicos Islands. In 1976, he played a central role in finalizing an agreement with Club Med, resulting in the construction of the country’s first major resort — a development widely considered a turning point in the emergence of tourism in the territory.

Saunders is widely regarded as the "Father of Tourism in the Turks and Caicos Islands", and his high-end tourism model continues to define the country’s approach to development. In May 2024, the South Caicos International Airport was renamed the Norman B. Saunders Sr. International Airport in his honour. In March 2025, American Airlines’ inaugural direct flight from Miami (Flight AA 3815) landed at the Norman B. Saunders Sr. International Airport, marking a major milestone in South Caicos’ re-emergence as a tourism destination.

== Cultural and Heritage Tourism ==
Cockburn Town in Grand Turk was founded in 1681 by Bermudian salt collectors. This has resulted in a British colonial heritage which continues to this day.

=== Major historical sites ===
- Grand Turk Lighthouse
- Wade's Green Plantation
- Cheshire Hall plantation
- Haulover Plantation

== Eco-Tourism ==
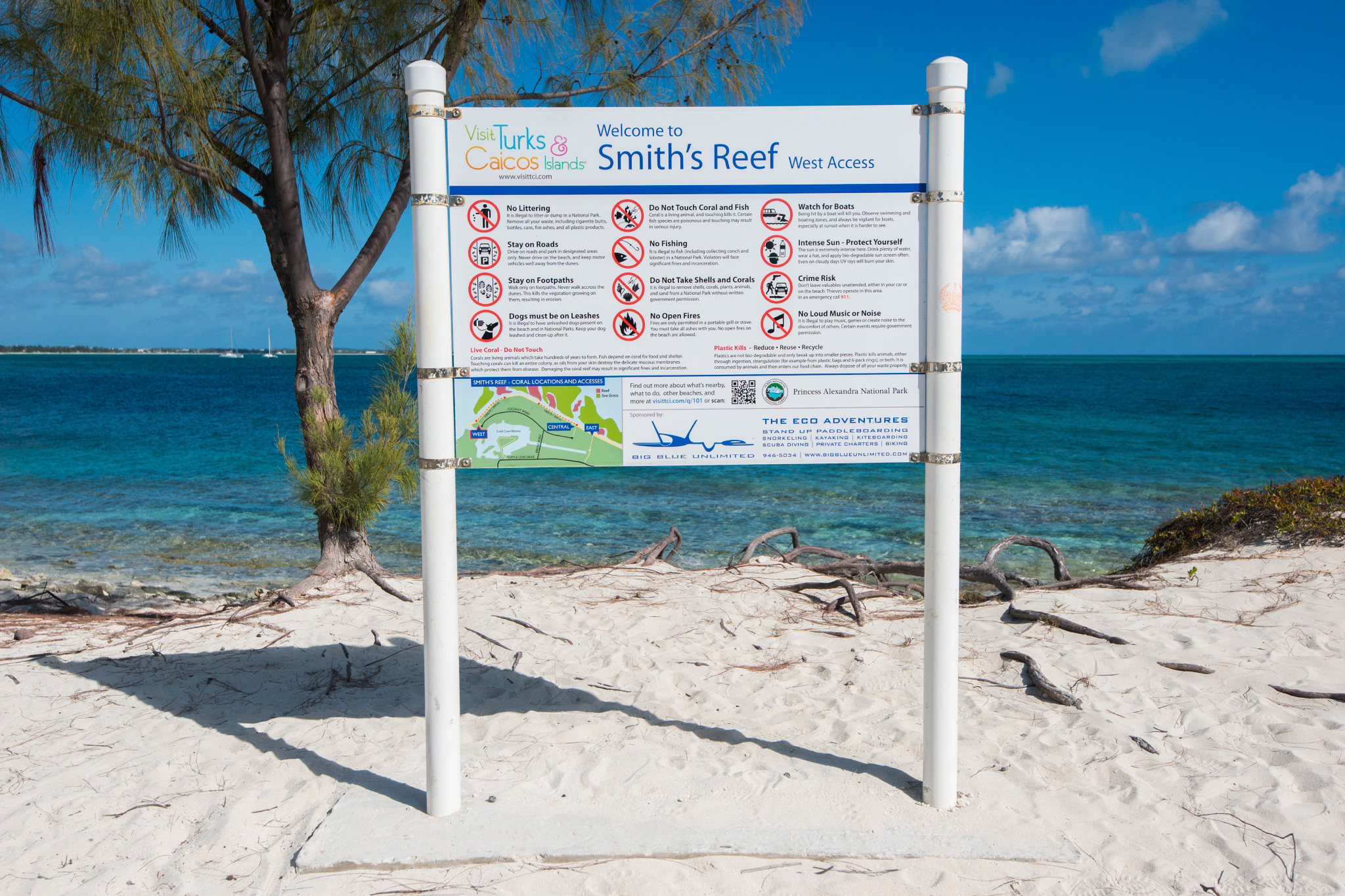
Beach sign at Smith's Reef, Providenciales

The Caicos Banks, which lie south of the chain of Caicos Islands, is a unique destination for many types of watersports, such as kiteboarding and Standup paddleboarding. A number of wetlands throughout the islands are protected under the Ramsar Convention. Providenciales is home to several national parks, including the Northwest Point National Park and the Pigeon Pond and Frenchman’s Creek Nature Reserve, which is home to the endangered West Indian whistling duck.

== Promotion of Tourism ==
Tourism promotion is handled through government grants to private businesses, direct marketing by large chain resorts, and organizations such as Visit Turks and Caicos Islands. interCaribbean Airways (formerly Air Turks and Caicos) is an important source of regional visitor traffic as there is a lack of regional airlift into the country. Expansion of the Providenciales International Airport was completed in 2015 in efforts to encourage more trans-Atlantic flights to the country.
