= Salt Cay =

Salt Cay is the name of several Caribbean islands:

- Salt Cay, Bahamas
- Salt Cay, British Virgin Islands
- Salt Cay, Turks Islands
  - Salt Cay Airport
- Salt Cay, U.S. Virgin Islands
