= Cheshire Hall Plantation =

Historical plantation in Providenciales, Turks and Caicos

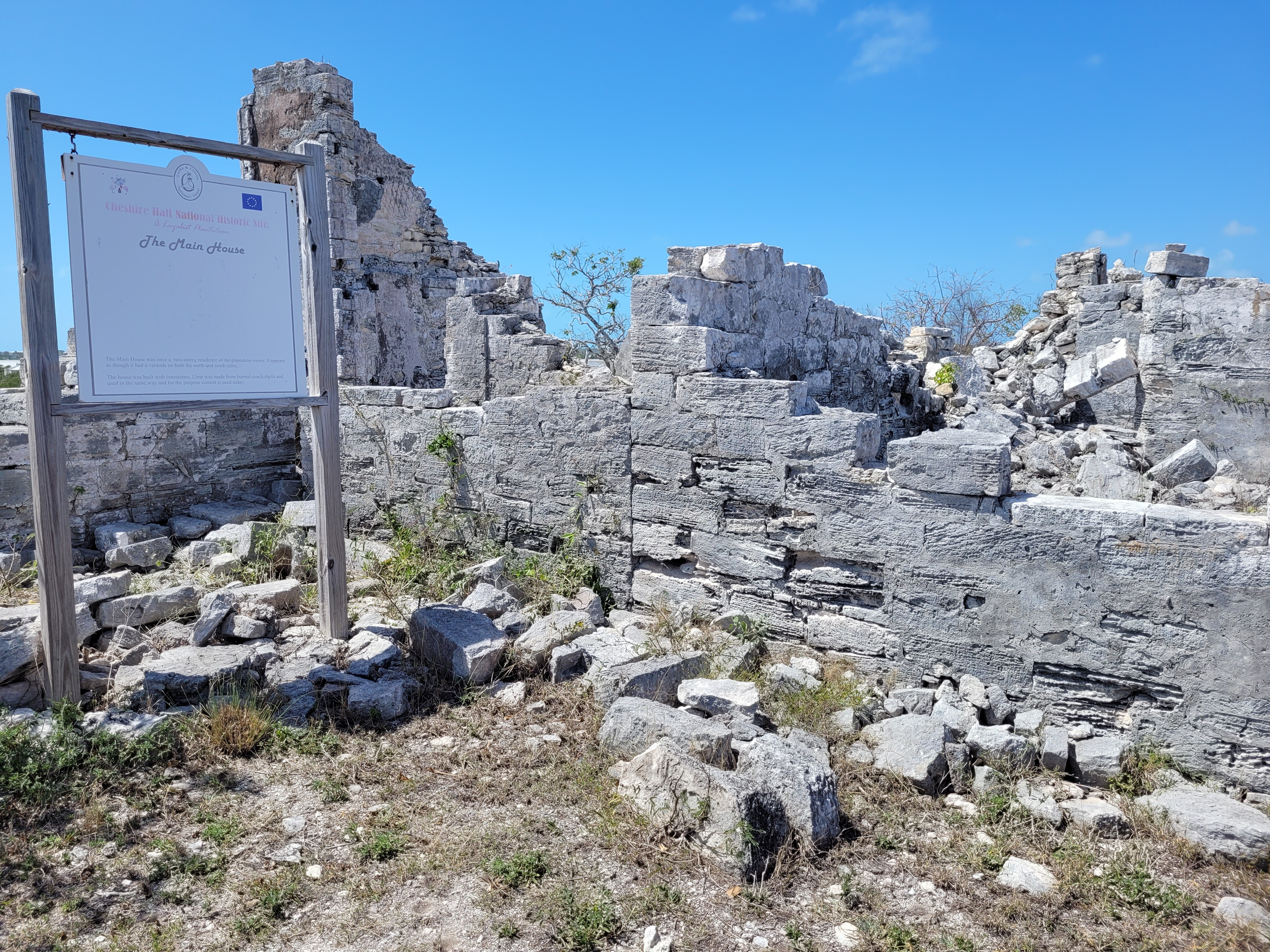
- Cheshire Hall Main House ruins
- Interactive map of the Cheshire Hall Plantation area

General information
- Location: Providenciales, Turks and Caicos Islands
- Coordinates: 21°46′51″N 72°15′07″W
- Construction started: circa 1783
- Owner: Turks and Caicos National Trust

Cheshire Hall Plantation was a 5,000-acre (2,000 ha) sisal and cotton plantation in Providenciales, Turks and Caicos Islands, owned by the British Loyalist Thomas Stubbs from the late 1700s until 1810 and afterwards by his brother Wade Stubbs. A portion of the former plantation is currently owned and managed as a historical site by the Turks and Caicos National Trust.

== Background ==
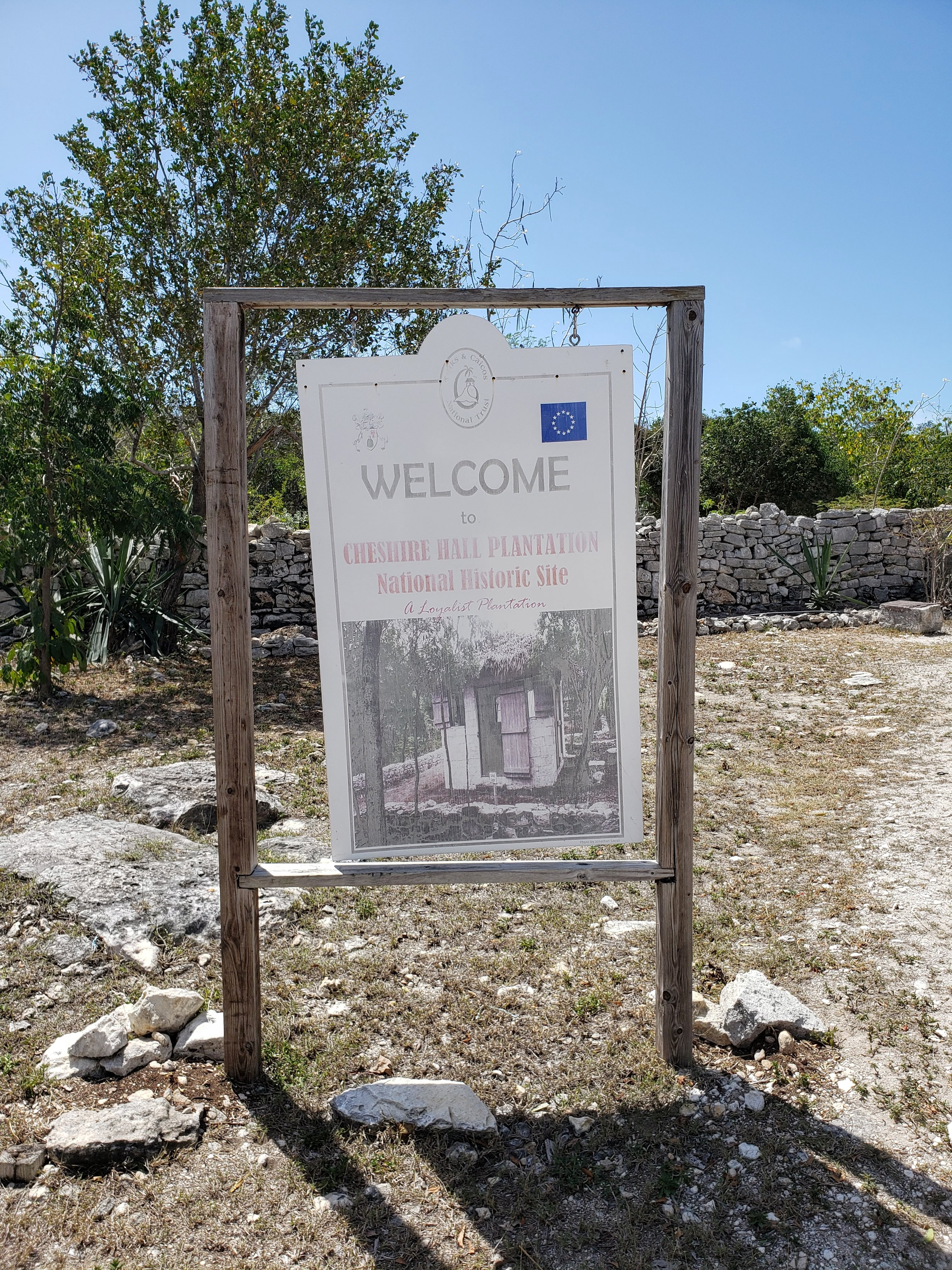
Cheshire Hall plantation sign

Cheshire Hall is located on a hilltop near the downtown area of Providenciales, Turks and Caicos.

As part of the end of the American Revolutionary War, the 1783 Treaty of Paris transferred Great Britain's possession of Florida to Spain in return for ownership of the Bahamas, which at the time included Turks and Caicos. Many of the Loyalist settlers in Florida did not want to live under Spanish rule and received compensatory land in Turks and Caicos. Wade Stubbs was one of the Loyalists who received land in North Caicos and developed a cotton plantation known as Bellefield and then later as Wade's Green.

Thomas Stubbs was encouraged by his brother, Wade, to move from England and become a planter. The Stubbs family were salt producers in Cheshire, England. Stubbs named the plantation after his home county and began to grow sisal and sea island cotton. The buildings on the site were built from locally cut limestone. At its peak of operations, Cheshire Hall consisted of approximately 5,000 acres and was worked by hundreds of slaves. The house and estate were the largest on the island at the time. However, low water availability and pest infestations diminished the plantation and Thomas eventually sold the land to his brother in 1810.

== Preservation of historical site ==
The site was left unprotected over the years and fell victim to theft and vandalism. Many of the outlying buildings, the burial grounds and field walls were destroyed or built over. In the 1990s, a project was initiated to preserve the site and improve access. The remaining buildings include the remnants of the main house and the cotton press bale. A cistern and well are also still present on the site. A modern replication of slave quarters and kitchen were added to the site. The site is maintained and operated by the Turks and Caicos National Trust.

== See also ==
- Tourism in the Turks and Caicos Islands
