= Jamaica Civil Aviation Authority =

Civil aviation authority of Jamaica

JCAA
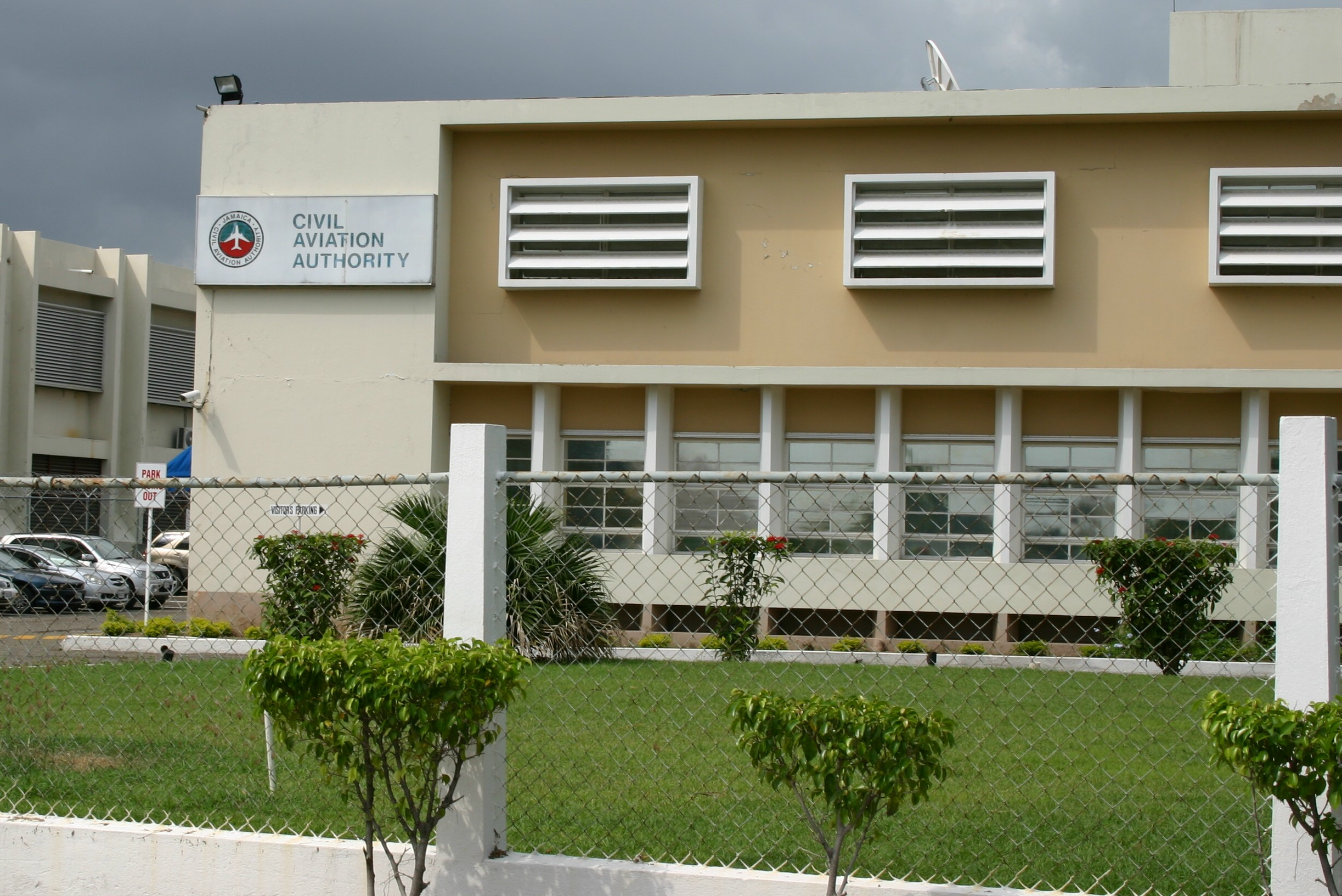
- The Civil Aviation Authority headquarters in Half Way Tree
- Formation: 1996; 29 years ago
- Headquarters: Kingston, Jamaica
- Website: https://www.jcaa.gov.jm/

The Jamaica Civil Aviation Authority (JCAA) is the civil aviation authority of Jamaica. Established in 1996, it is under the Ministry of Transport and Mining. The JCAA is headquartered in Kingston.

== Aircraft accident investigations ==
- American Airlines Flight 331
