= American Airlines Flight 331 =

2009 aviation accident in Jamaica

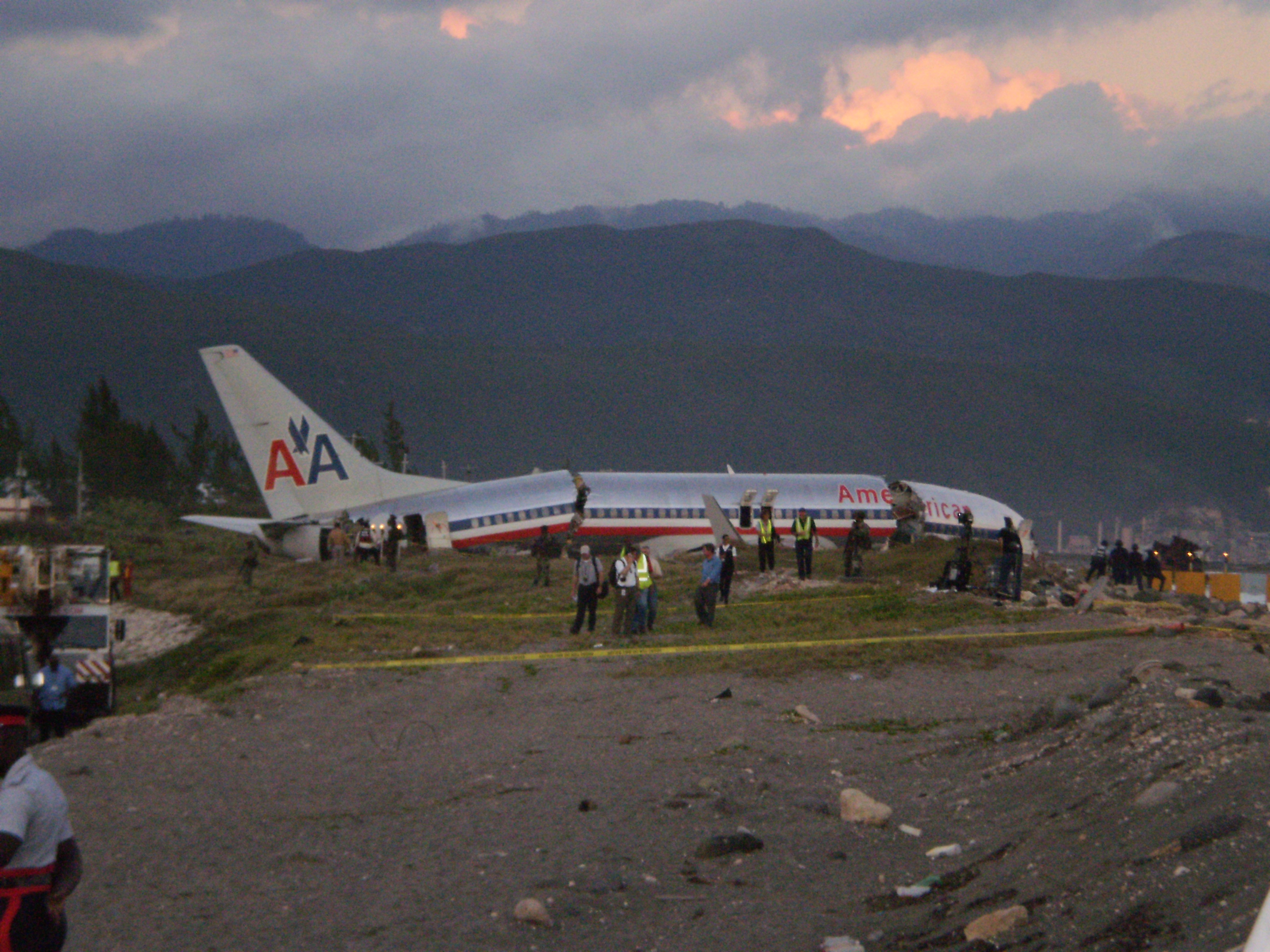
- The wreckage of N977AN

Accident
- Date: 22 December 2009
- Summary: Runway excursion in inclement weather due to pilot error
- Site: Norman Manley International Airport, Kingston, Jamaica; 17°55′51″N 76°46′30″W

Aircraft
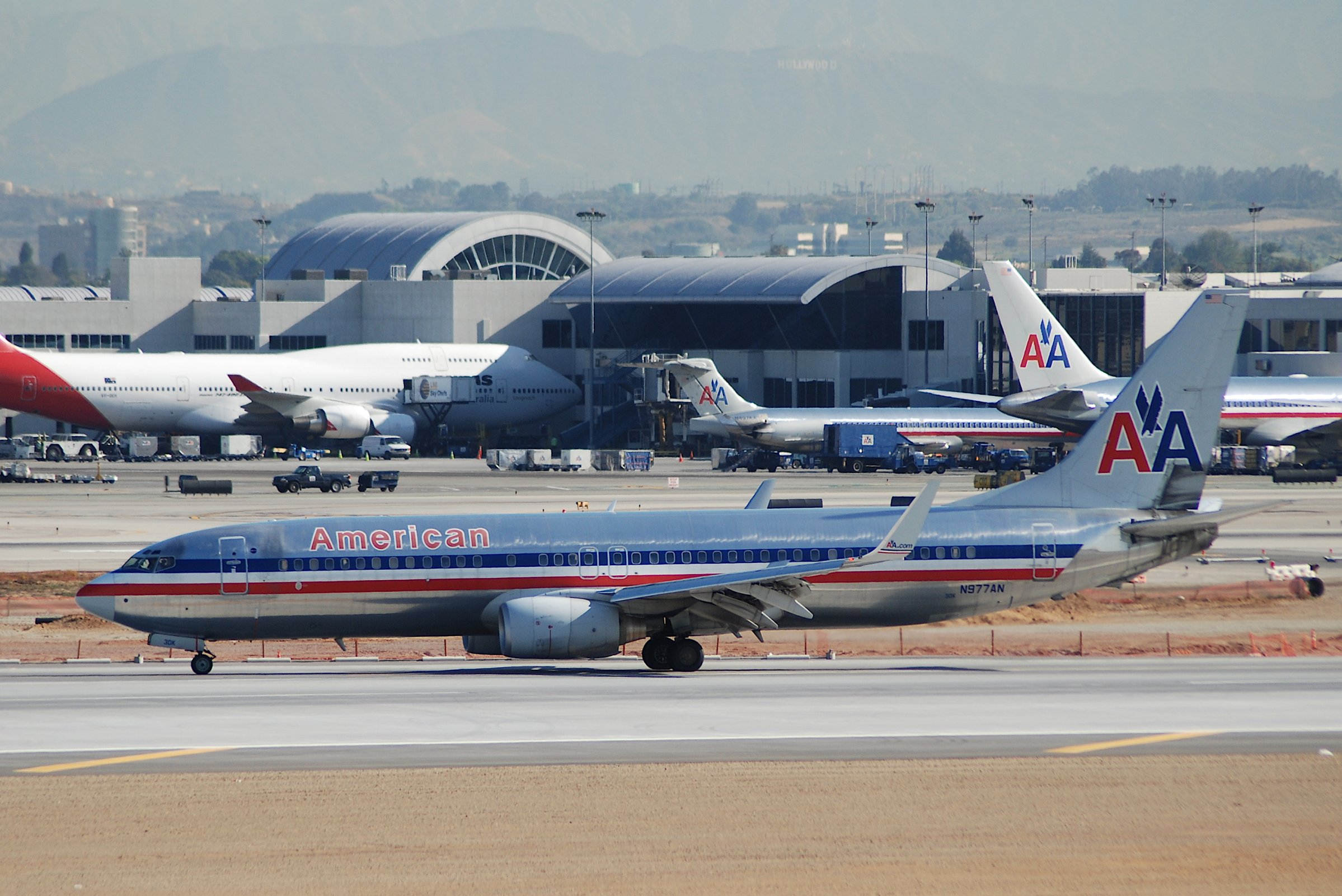
- N977AN, the aircraft involved in the accident, photographed in 2007
- Aircraft type: Boeing 737-823
- Operator: American Airlines
- IATA flight No.: AA331
- ICAO flight No.: AAL331
- Call sign: AMERICAN 331
- Registration: N977AN
- Flight origin: Ronald Reagan Washington National Airport, Arlington, Virginia, United States
- Stopover: Miami International Airport Miami, Florida, United States
- Destination: Norman Manley International Airport, Kingston, Jamaica
- Occupants: 154
- Passengers: 148
- Crew: 6
- Fatalities: 0
- Injuries: 85
- Survivors: 154

On 22 December 2009, an American Airlines Boeing 737-800, operating American Airlines Flight 331 (Washington, D.C.–Miami–Kingston, Jamaica) and carrying 148 passengers and 6 crew, overran runway 12 on landing at Kingston in poor weather. The plane continued on the ground outside the airport perimeter and broke apart on the beach. Of the 154 people on board, 85 people were injured, including 14 seriously.

Factors contributing to the crash include the speed of the aircraft upon landing and the plane touching down more than 4,000 feet (1,200 m) from the threshold of the runway. Contributing factors included American Airlines' failure to provide training on tailwind landings, and the FAA's failure to implement the NTSB's previous recommendation, following a previous fatal accident involving a tailwind landing attempt, that the FAA require commercial operators to train flight crews on tailwind landings.

== Aircraft and crew ==
The aircraft involved was a Boeing 737-823, registration N977AN. The aircraft had manufacturer's serial number 29550.

The captain was 49-year-old Brian Cole, who had joined American Airlines in 1986. He had previously served as a captain/check airman on the Boeing 727 but now served as a Boeing 737 captain when the airline retired their 727s. Captain Cole had 11,147 flight hours, including 2,727 hours on the Boeing 737, and had prior experience landing on runway 12 at Kingston during inclement weather.

The first officer was 45-year-old Daniel Billingsley, who had been with American Airlines since 1998, initially serving as a Boeing 727 first officer. He became a first officer on the Boeing 737 in 2002. He had 6,120 flight hours, with 5,027 of them on the Boeing 737. Both pilots had previously flown together. The first officer stated that he "was very comfortable flying" with Captain Cole.

== Accident ==
The flight originated at Ronald Reagan Washington National Airport, Washington, D.C., with a stopover at Miami International Airport, Miami, Florida. At 22:22 local time (03:22, 23 December UTC), the Boeing 737-823 skidded during landing on runway 12 and overran the pavement, sustaining serious damage. Heavy rain was reported at the time. After the accident, a special weather report was issued.

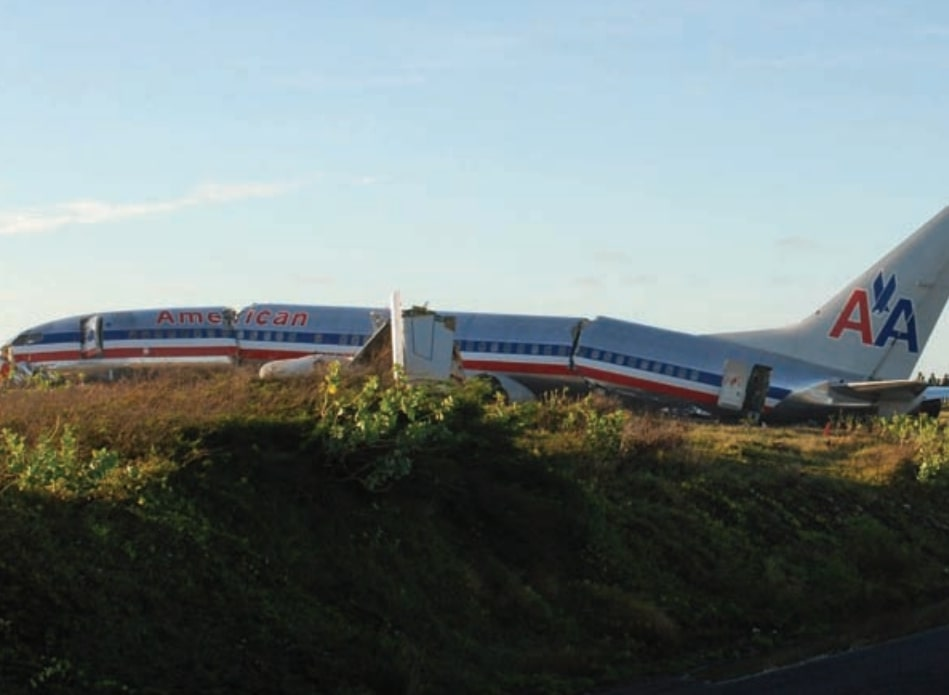
Another view of the hull of Flight 331

Some passengers indicated cabin service was suspended several times during the flight, before being canceled outright due to turbulence; others report the jet may have landed long on the runway.

It was also announced that some of the airport's approach lights were not working at the time of the accident. Jamaican officials downplayed the role of the malfunctioning lights in the crash, noting that aircrews had been notified and that the actual runway was properly lit. The ground-based navigation aids were evaluated by a check aircraft after the accident and were determined to be functioning normally.

The aircraft sustained substantial damage during the accident, with the entire fuselage fracturing forward and aft of the wing, one wing losing an engine and the other its winglet tip, and the nose section being crushed. The landing gear failed and put the aircraft on its belly. Its momentum carried it through the perimeter fence at freeway speeds, and across Norman Manley Highway before finally coming to rest upright, within meters of Kingston's outer harbor and the open Caribbean Sea. The 737 was damaged beyond economic repair, and was written off. The accident represents the sixth hull loss of a Boeing 737-800.

== Response and investigation ==
Although the airport was closed after the accident, delaying about 400 travellers, it later re-opened with a reduced runway length available due to the tail section wreckage. Larger flights were diverted to Montego Bay's Sangster International Airport for two days.

An investigation into the accident was launched by the National Transportation Safety Board. They sent a team to assist the Jamaica Civil Aviation Authority officials in the investigation. American Airlines also sent a crash team to assist the other investigators.

Later reports showed the crew had contacted Jamaica Air Traffic Control to request the Instrument Landing System (ILS) approach for Runway 12, the designated runway broadcast by the Automatic Terminal Information Service (ATIS) for arrivals that night. They were, however, advised of tailwind conditions on Runway 12 and offered a circling approach for landing on Runway 30. "The crew repeated their request for Runway 12 and were subsequently cleared to land on that runway with the controller further advising the crew that the runway was wet."

Jamaican Director General of Civil Aviation Col. Oscar Derby, stated in the week following the accident, that the jet touched down about halfway down the 8,910-foot (2,720 m) runway. He also noted that the 737-800 is equipped with a head-up display ("HUD"). Other factors that were under investigation included "tailwinds, and a rain soaked runway;" the runway in question was not equipped with rain-dispersing grooves common at larger airports. The aircraft held a relatively heavy fuel load at the time of landing; it was carrying enough fuel for a roundtrip flight back to the US.

The FDR later revealed that the aircraft touched down some 4,100 feet (1,200 m) down the 8,910-foot (2,720 m) long runway. Normally touchdown would be between 1,000 feet (300 m) and 1,500 feet (460 m). The aircraft was still travelling at 72 miles per hour (63 kn; 116 km/h) when it departed the end of the runway. The aircraft landed with a 16 miles per hour (14 kn; 26 km/h) tailwind, just within its limit of 17 miles per hour (15 kn; 27 km/h).

After the crash it was announced American Airlines was involved in an FAA review of company landing procedures following three landing incidents in two weeks; in the other two instances plane wingtips touched the ground during landing. During the NTSB's investigation, the flight crew informed the NTSB in post-accident interviews that they had not received any training on conducting landings in tailwind conditions. In addition, the NTSB was told by other American Airlines pilots that they were not given simulator training on tailwind landings or given guidance about runway overrun risks associated with tailwind landings.

== Passenger details ==
According to the U.S. State Department, 76 of the passengers on board were Americans.

Although 92 people were taken to the hospital, there were no life-threatening injuries reported.

Reports from Jamaica indicate that as of December 28, 2009, most passenger and crew property was yet to be returned due to the investigation; American Airlines provided each passenger $5,000 to compensate for the lengthy quarantine of baggage.

== Aftermath ==
On December 7, 2011, the NTSB issued a safety recommendation based on the results of its investigation into the crash of Flight 331. The NTSB recommended that the FAA take actions to ensure adequate pilot training in simulator training programs on tailwind approaches and landings, particularly on wet or contaminated runways, and revise its advisories on runway overrun prevention to include a discussion of risks associated with tailwind landings.

The NTSB also restated its previous recommendation, made following the crash of Southwest Airlines Flight 1248, that the FAA require commercial airline pilots to perform arrival landing distance assessments which include a conservative safety margin before every landing. The NTSB noted that while the FAA had proposed such a rule, operators were still not required to comply and many operators, including American Airlines, were not at the time of the Flight 331 crash. As a result, the NTSB's safety recommendation was reiterated and reclassified as "Open—Unacceptable Response."

On May 2, 2014, the JCAA issued its final report. The final investigation report identified multiple causes and contributing factors to the accident, which included:

- Flight 331's flight crew was not provided with an accurate and current report on the runway conditions at Kingston.
- The flight crew did not review the approach options, and as a result, were not aware of a standing water warning at the Kingston airport and did not select the most suitable runway for landing.
- The flight crew decided to land in heavy rain on a wet runway in a tailwind close to the tailwind landing limit.
- The flight crew did not use the maximum level of autobrake or flaps available.
- The aircraft touched down over 4,000 feet from the runway threshold.

Like the NTSB, the JCAA also recommended that flight crews be required to perform arrival landing distance assessments which include a conservative safety margin before every landing, and that actions should be taken to require appropriate flight crew guidance and training regarding tailwind landings.

The pilots' failure to abort the landing and climb to go around has been compared to the later fatal crash of Asiana Airlines Flight 214. In the Asiana Airlines incident, the pilot failed to abort the landing and initiate a "go-around" until it was too late to prevent the crash.

Captain Cole returned to flying with American Airlines in 2013.

== See also ==
- Air France Flight 358
- China Airlines Flight 605
- Caribbean Airlines Flight 523
- Southwest Airlines Flight 1248
- American Airlines Flight 1420 – An accident that took place 10 years earlier under nearly-identical circumstances, albeit with fatalities.
- TAM Airlines Flight 3054 - A similar accident where the aircraft overshot a wet runway, with 199 fatalities
