= InterCaribbean Airways =

Passenger airline in the Turks and Caicos Islands

interCaribbean Airways
IATA	ICAO	Call sign
JY	IWY	ISLANDWAYS
- Founded: 1991
- Hubs: Providenciales International Airport; Terrance B. Lettsome International Airport; Grantley Adams International Airport
- Focus cities: Las Americas International Airport
- Fleet size: 17 (May 2026)
- Destinations: 23
- Parent company: Interisland Aviation Services Group
- Headquarters: Providenciales, Turks and Caicos Islands
- Key people: Lyndon Gardiner, chairman Trevor Sadler, CEO
- Website: www.intercaribbean.com

InterCaribbean Airways Limited, formerly known as Air Turks & Caicos and InterIsland Airways, is a regional airline based in the Turks and Caicos Islands. The airline offers scheduled passenger flights and charter flight services from its hub in Providenciales International Airport. Since its launch in 1991, its travel destinations have expanded to multiple Caribbean islands including Antigua, The Bahamas, Barbados, Haiti, Jamaica, Puerto Rico, St. Lucia and St. Maarten.

== History ==
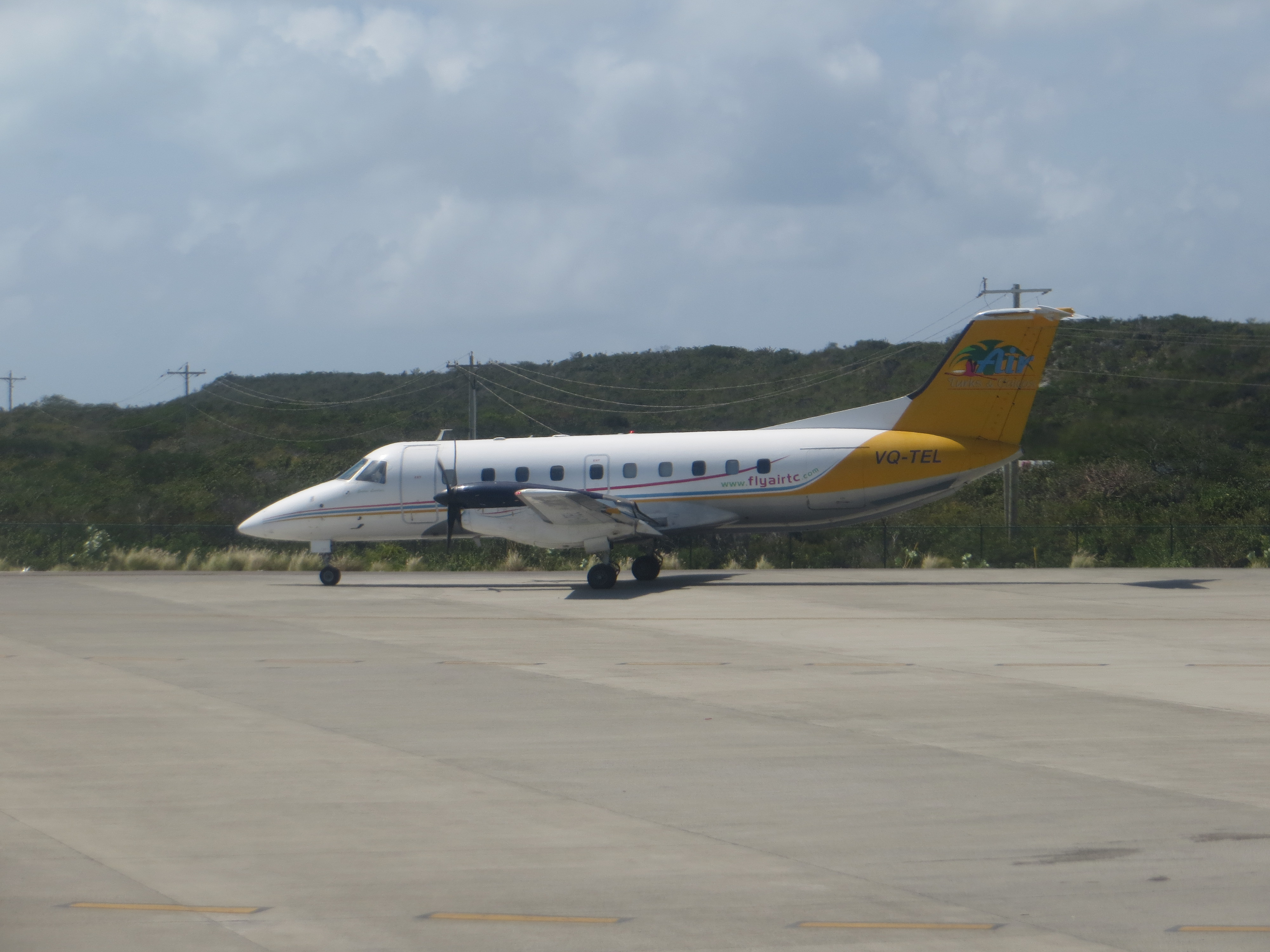
An interCaribbean Airways Embraer 120 at Providenciales International Airport, in the old livery

The airline was established in 1991 by Lyndon Gardiner as InterIsland Airways. In 2003, it was rebranded Air Turks & Caicos.

In 2008, Air Turks and Caicos merged with SkyKing. The SkyKing brand was integrated into the Air Turks and Caicos operations on 22 October 2008, and by mid-2009 the airline continued operating with a single air operator's certificate.

In November 2013, it was rebranded InterCaribbean Airways. By June 2019, InterCaribbean Airways added the Embraer ERJ-145 regional jet aircraft to its fleet.

In addition to the Embraer ERJ-145, the airline currently operates Embraer EMB 120s, as well as two De Havilland Canada DHC-6 Twin Otters. InterCaribbean also previously operated the Britten-Norman BN-2A Islander twin prop aircraft. The Twin Otter aircraft joined the fleet in December 2015, while the Britten-Norman Islander aircraft has been retired.

In 2022, InterCaribbean Airways gained operational rights in Jamaica as a non-Jamaican airline to operate domestic flights between the island's main airports, Kingston and Montego Bay.

In February 2023, InterCaribbean announced it would start flying from St. Kitts to Barbados' Grantley Adams International Airport.

The airline was crowned "World's Leading Regional Airline 2024" at the prestigious World Travel Awards (WTA) Grand Final Gala Ceremony in Madeira, Portugal. It earlier won the title of "Caribbean's Leading Cabin Crew 2024 of the WTTC"

In December 2025, the airline announced new routes from Barbados to Port of Spain's Piarco International Airport, Georgetown's Eugene F. Correia International Airport, St. Maarten's Princess Juliana International Airport, Tortola's Terrance B. Lettsome International Airport, and Providenciales International Airport.

== Destinations ==
As of February 2023, InterCaribbean Airways operated scheduled flights to the following destinations within the Caribbean:

Country	City	Airport	Notes	Refs
Antigua and Barbuda	Osbourn	V. C. Bird International Airport		
The Bahamas	Nassau	Lynden Pindling International Airport		
Barbados	Bridgetown	Grantley Adams International Airport	Hub	
British Virgin Islands	Tortola	Terrance B. Lettsome International Airport	Hub	
Cuba	Havana	José Martí International Airport		
Cuba	Santiago de Cuba	Antonio Maceo Airport		
Dominica	Marigot	Douglas-Charles Airport		
Dominican Republic	Puerto Plata	Gregorio Luperón Airport	Seasonal	
Dominican Republic	Punta Cana	Punta Cana International Airport	Seasonal	
Dominican Republic	Santiago de los Caballeros	Cibao International Airport		
Dominican Republic	Santo Domingo	Las Américas International Airport	Focus city	
Grenada	St. George's	Maurice Bishop International Airport		
Guyana	Georgetown	Cheddi Jagan International Airport		
Guyana	Georgetown	Eugene F. Correia International Airport		
Haiti	Cap-Haïtien	Cap-Haïtien International Airport		
Haiti	Port-au-Prince	Toussaint Louverture International Airport		
Jamaica	Kingston	Norman Manley International Airport		
Jamaica	Montego Bay	Sangster International Airport	Seasonal	
Jamaica	Ocho Rios	Ian Fleming International Airport		
Puerto Rico	San Juan	Luis Muñoz Marín International Airport		
Saint Kitts and Nevis	Basseterre	Robert L. Bradshaw International Airport		
Saint Lucia	Castries	George F. L. Charles Airport		
Saint Vincent and the Grenadines	Kingstown	Argyle International Airport		
Sint Maarten	Philipsburg	Princess Juliana International Airport		
Turks and Caicos	Grand Turk	JAGS McCartney International Airport		
Turks and Caicos	Providenciales	Providenciales Airport	Hub	
Turks and Caicos	Salt Cay	Salt Cay Airport		
Turks and Caicos	South Caicos	South Caicos Airport		

== Fleet ==
As at May 2026, the fleet comprised the following:

Aircraft	In service	Orders	Passengers	Refs/Notes
ATR 42-500	9	–	40	
ATR 72-500	2	–	68	
Bombardier CRJ900	1	–	90	Leased from CemAir
de Havilland Canada DHC-6 Twin Otter	2	–	19	
Embraer ERJ-145	3	–	50	
Embraer E170	2	6	76	
Total	19	6		

The airline leased Embraer EMB 120 from October 2014 to February 2016 to Cayman Airways for scheduled inter-island passenger flights in the Cayman Islands. The airline acquired two Embraer 145 regional jets, which it began operating commercially from early June 2019, and has since acquired an additional Embraer ERJ 145.

=== Previously operated ===
Aircraft	In service	Passengers	Refs/Notes
Beechcraft Model 99	1	15	
Bombardier CRJ700	1	70	Leased from CemAir
Bombardier CRJ900	1	90	Leased from CemAir
Britten-Norman BN-2 Islander	1	8	
de Havilland Canada DHC-6 Twin Otter	2	19	
Embraer EMB 120	10	30	
Embraer ERJ-145	2	50	
Total	18		
