= North Caicos Airport =

- IATA: NCA; ICAO: MBNC

Summary
- Airport type: Public
- Location: North Caicos, Turks and Caicos Islands
- Elevation AMSL: 10 ft / 3 m
- Coordinates: 21°55′03″N 071°56′22″W

Map
- Location in North Caicos

Runways
| Direction | Length | | Surface |
| Direction | m | ft | Surface |
|---|---|---|---|
| 08/26 | 1,294 | 4,245 | Asphalt |
- Source: DAFIF

North Caicos Airport (IATA: NCA, ICAO: MBNC) is an airport serving North Caicos, the second largest of the Turks and Caicos Islands.

== Facilities ==
The airport is at an elevation of 10 ft (3 m) above mean sea level. It has one runway designated 08/26 with an asphalt surface measuring 1,294 m × 23 m (4,245 ft × 75 ft).

== Airlines and destinations ==
| Airlines | Destinations |
|---|---|
| Caicos Express Airways | Providenciales |
