= Visit Turks and Caicos Islands =

Tourism organization

- Industry: Tourism
- Website: www.visittci.com

Visit Turks and Caicos Islands is an organization tasked with promoting tourism in the Turks and Caicos Islands. Tourism is the main driver of the national economy in the islands, accounting for 42.8% of the national GDP in 2013.

== Signage ==
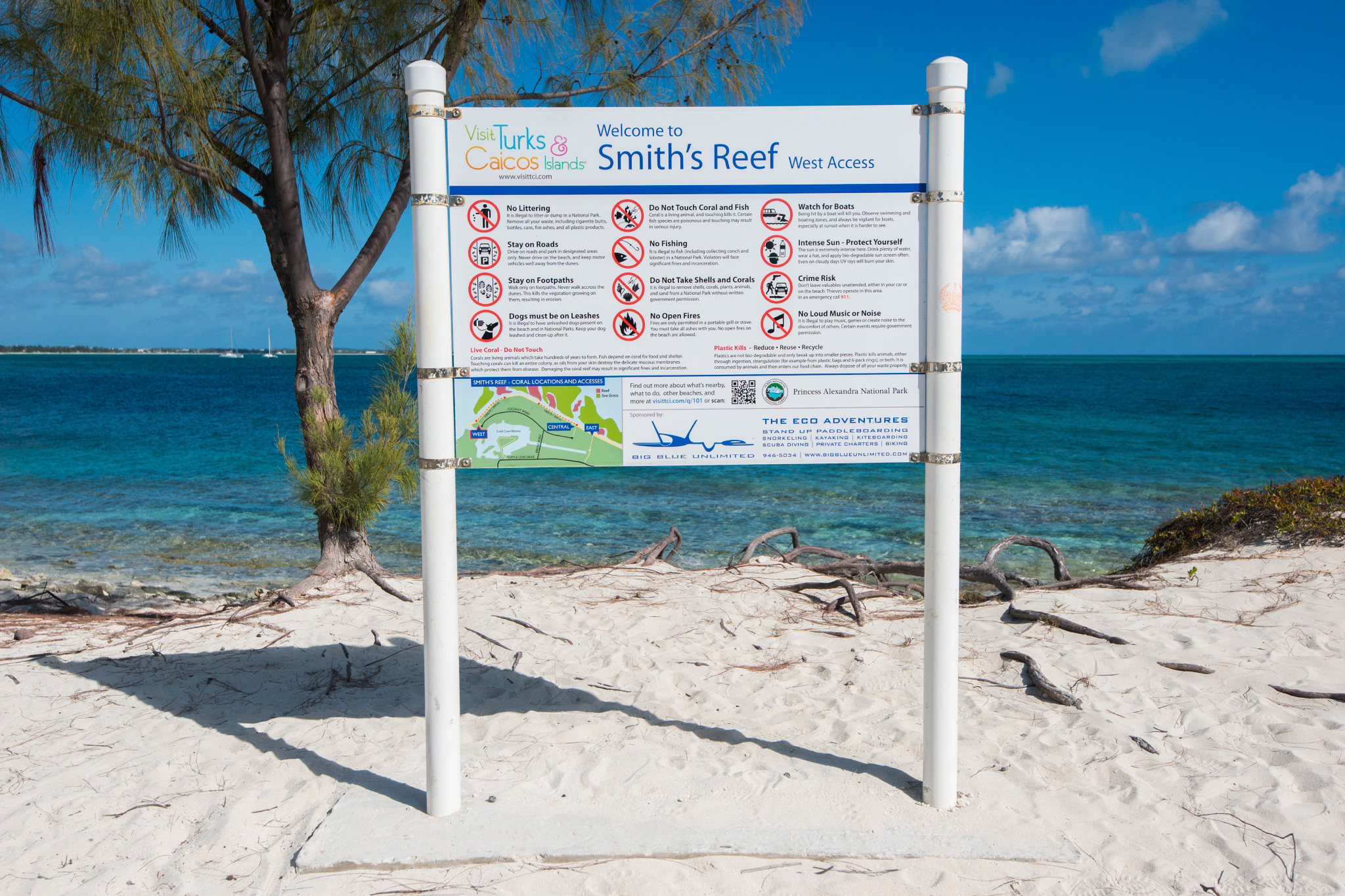
Beach sign at Smith's Reef, Providenciales

Visit Turks and Caicos Islands, through a partnership with local businesses, has constructed conservation signage at beaches in the Turks and Caicos, highlighting dangers and guidelines for protecting the natural eco-system.

== See also ==
- Tourism in the Turks and Caicos Islands
