= Salt Cay Airport =

- IATA: SLX; ICAO: MBSY

Summary
- Airport type: Public (Turks And Caicos domestic flights only) (scheduled & charter)
- Operator: Turks and Caicos Civil Aviation Department
- Location: Salt Cay, Turks Islands
- Elevation AMSL: 12 ft (3.7 m)
- Coordinates: 21°20′N 071°12′W

Map
- Location in Salt Cay

Runways
Direction	Length		Surface
Direction	m	ft	Surface
08/26	822	2,697	Paved
- Source: DAFIF SkyVector

Salt Cay Airport (IATA: SLX, ICAO: MBSY) is the public airport serving Salt Cay, the second largest of the Turks Islands in the Turks and Caicos Islands. It was established as an airstrip in the 1970s. Since the late 2010s, the airport underwent further upgrades, and was renamed as Leon Wilson Airport in 2020. It has a single 822 m (2,697 ft) paved runway, capable of handling smaller aircraft. It does not have regular scheduled services, and handles weekly and seasonal services.

== History ==
The Salt Cay airstrip was established in the 1970s. In the mid-2010s, Caicos Express Airways operated a tri-weekly service from the airport to JAGS McCartney International Airport in Grand Turk with a Cessna 402. The airline suspended its operations in July 2017, after the Turks & Caicos Islands Civil Aviation Authority (TCICAA) restricted the airline's Air Operating Certificate (AOC) to prevent operations to the airport after the airport's license was not renewed after it had expired on 26 June 2017. The TCICAA chose not to renew it based on safety concerns with the runway and other infrastructure at the airport. The opposition stated that the planned upgradation of the airport was not carried out, which resulted in the poor status of the runway and the subsequent closure. Subsequently, work on the runway was carried out by the state Aviation Authority and the TCICAA lifted the restriction on Caicos Express to fly to the Salt Cay airport.

The Salt Cay airport was closed again in late July 2019. As per the TCICAA, the airport would be closed for ten weeks, for major scheduled upgrades. The upgradation, which has been planned since 2007, was carried out at a cost of US$4.5 million. The project involved relaying the runway surface, installation of markings and signage, safety strips, improvements to the drainage system, and relocation of the perimeter fence. The taxiways and flight aprons were also relaid during the improvement works. However, the reopening of the airport was delayed as the works were not completed, and the facility reopened in October 2020. It was later renamed as 'Leon Wilson Airport' in honor of Henry Leon Wilson, a parliamentarian from Salt Cay.

== Infrastructure ==
The airport has a single 822 m (2,697 ft) paved runway, capable of handling smaller aircraft. It has a single building which functions as the passenger terminal.

== Destinations ==
The airport does not have regular scheduled air services and is used for seasonal air traffic. It has a few weekly flights from Grand Turk and Providenciales International Airport.
