= Norman Manley International Airport =

Airport in Jamaica

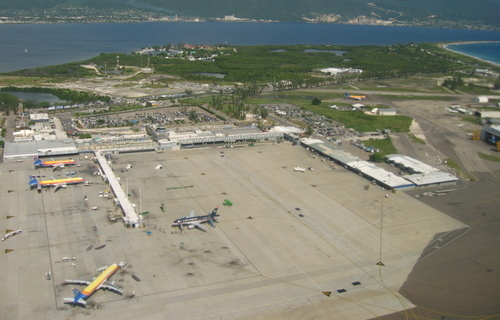
- IATA: KIN; ICAO: MKJP

Summary
- Airport type: Public
- Operator: Grupo Aeroportuario del Pacífico
- Serves: Kingston, Jamaica
- Location: Palisadoes
- Hub for: Caribbean Airlines
- Elevation AMSL: 10 ft (3.0 m)
- Coordinates: 17°56′08″N 076°47′15″W
- Website: nmia.aero

Map
- Location in Jamaica

Runways
Direction	Length		Surface
Direction	ft	m	Surface
12/30	8,911	2,716	Asphalt

Statistics (2024)
- Total passengers: 1,777,100
- Source: DAFIF, Grupo Aeroportuario del Pacífico

Norman Manley International Airport (IATA: KIN, ICAO: MKJP), formerly Palisadoes Airport, is an international airport serving Kingston, Jamaica, and is located in the south of the island, 19 km (12 mi) away from the centre of New Kingston. It is the second busiest airport in the country after Sangster International Airport, recording 629,400 arriving passengers in 2020 and 830,500 in 2021. Over 130 international flights a week depart from Norman Manley International Airport. Named in honour of Jamaican statesman Norman Manley (1893–1969), it is a hub for Caribbean Airlines. It is located on the Palisadoes tombolo in outer Kingston Harbour; it fronts the city on one side and the Caribbean Sea on the other.

== History ==
Jamaica has long had a vibrant civil aviation industry, with the first flight reported in the island on 21 December 1911. This was eight years after the world recorded its first powered flight by the Wright brothers. Nineteen years later, on 3 December 1930, the first commercial flight, a Consolidated Commodore twin-engine flying boat operated by Pan American Airways (which eventually became Pan American World Airways), landed in Kingston Harbour.

The year 1934 was also another historic period for the nation's aviation industry when Dr. Albert Ernest Forsythe and C. Alfred "Chief" Anderson (the fathers of African American aviation) arrived in Jamaica from Cuba. This was the first time a land plane arrived at the island by air.

Palisadoes was selected as the site for the capital's airport because of its nearness to Kingston, its capacity to support both land and seaplanes, and its accessibility via road and water. The airfield was initially built between 1938 and 1939 by local authorities to function as a civil airport for Kingston, but it was taken over after the onset of the Second World War.

=== World War II ===
In August 1940, the Royal Navy initiated the development of the Palisadoes airfield as a Naval Air Station, under the jurisdiction of HMS Malabar in Bermuda, which was commissioned as part of HMS Malabar III on 1 August 1940, whilst under construction. The station became operational by July 1941, known as RNAS Palisadoes, it was re-commissioned as an independent command, as HMS Buzzard on 12 July 1941. The initial Fleet Air Arm squadron to arrive at the station was 829 Squadron, with six Fairey Swordfish torpedo bombers from HMS Formidable on 23 August. The ship was en route to the Norfolk Naval Shipyard, Virginia, for repairs following battle damage. Shortly thereafter, 810 Squadron's six Fairey Swordfish arrived, from HMS Furious on 1 October.

In early November 1941, a group of four Hawker Sea Hurricanes fighter aircraft from 880 Squadron arrived at the station after being disembarked from HMS Indomitable on 4 November for a four-day period. Subsequently, on 28 November, additional aircraft from HMS Indomitable arrived, including another detachment of three Hawker Sea Hurricanes from 880 Squadron and eighteen Fairey Fulmars, a fighter and reconnaissance aircraft from 800 Squadron. Both squadrons departed on 2 December, boarding HMS Illustrious. The following day, all aircraft for HMS Indomitable re-embarked, only to return on 6 December, this time with a detachment of two Hawker Sea Hurricanes alongside the Fairey Fulmars.

The initial formation of six new Fairey Swordfish squadrons took place at RNAS Palisadoes on 10 December, with the commissioning of 834 Squadron, a unit designated for Torpedo-Bomber and Reconnaissance missions, which was equipped with four Fairey Swordfish. Five of these newly established squadrons were designated for the forthcoming American-built escort carriers that were set to commence operations in the upcoming months. 834 Squadron was assigned to the first of these vessels, HMS Archer.

On 12 December, the Fairey Fulmars of 800 Squadron re-embarked aboard HMS Indomitable, while the Hawker Sea Hurricanes left the following day. Consequently, only the four Fairey Swordfish from 834 Squadron remained stationed at the base throughout the Christmas and New Year period, diligently preparing for their carrier, which was scheduled for March 1942.

The second Fairey Swordfish squadron, designated 816, was officially commissioned on 1 February 1942, equipped with four Fairey Swordfish aircraft. This squadron was assigned to the newly commissioned escort carrier HMS Avenger. Subsequently, 835 Squadron was commissioned on 15 February, also with four Fairey Swordfish, followed by 836 Squadron on 1 March, which was equipped with six Fairey Swordfish.

Following a brief workup period, 835 Squadron relocated to the RN Air Section at US Naval Air Station Norfolk, Virginia, arriving on 12 March. Next to depart was 834 Squadron, which embarked on HMS Archer on 19 March. 816 Squadron followed, arriving at Naval Air Station Norfolk on 22 March. The six Fairey Swordfish of 836 Squadron, now the only operational unit at the station, continued their workup throughout April and the beginning of May. On 1 May, they were joined by 837 Squadron, which was formed at this location with four Fairey Swordfish. Once their workup was complete, 836 Squadron departed for the RN Air Section at Naval Air Station Floyd Bennett Field, Brooklyn, New York City.

In June 1942, floatplane support duties were added to the responsibilities of HMS Buzzard, which was tasked with servicing Vought Kingfisher observation floatplanes and Supermarine Walrus amphibious maritime patrol aircraft from armed merchant cruisers (AMC) and Royal Navy vessels. The final squadron to be established at RNAS Palisadoes was 840 Squadron, which was commissioned on 1 June with six Fairey Swordfish. 837 Squadron departed for Naval Air Station Floyd Bennett Field, on 7 July, leaving 840 Squadron as the last unit to operate from the station before their departure for Naval Air Station Miami, Florida, on 25 October 1942.

Following the deployment of all squadrons, HMS Buzzard was officially decommissioned on 16 July 1943 and subsequently assigned to Care & Maintenance status with a three-month notice period to resume operations on 17 July 1943. It was recorded under the administration of HMS Morgan, RN Depot, Kingston. RNAS Palisadoes was ultimately shut down on 31 December 1944 and transitioned back to civilian operations as Kingston's airport.

=== Back to civilian use ===
The significant growth in the aviation sector led to the establishment of the Civil Aviation Department (CAD) in 1947. One year later, in 1948, the Kingston Air Traffic Control Centre (KATCC) was established. In the same year, Palisadoes Airport (now Norman Manley International) and Montego Bay Airport (now Sangster International Airport) were established.

The airport was featured in the first James Bond film, Dr. No (1962).

From October 1968, it was the hub for Jamaica's flag carrier, Air Jamaica, until that airline ceased operations during 2015.

== Renovation ==
=== Existing terminal renovation ===
The contract relating to additions and alterations to the departure concourse has been awarded to Kier Construction Limited and is valued at $161.5M. The work will include construction of a new canopy, north of the existing check-in concourse and departure lounge; construction of an additional drop-off pavement area and provision for access by wheelchair passengers; new lifts, electrical air conditioning, public address, fire detection and fire fighting services; and alterations to the existing check-in concourse and mezzanine level to include a new security post and postal agency.

The architect / engineer for the designs are Llewelyn Davies, Jabobs Consultancy & Leading Edge Aviation Planning Professionals Limited (LEAPP), in conjunction with Peter Jervis and Associates Limited and Grace Ashley and Associates.

=== Masterplan ===
The project seeks to increase the airport's capacity to cater for projected air and passenger traffic at an acceptable level of service to the year 2023. The project is part of a 20-year masterplan which will be implemented in three phases (1A, 1B and 2) and will cost about $130M. By 2022, it will have involved a virtual reconstruction of the entire airport.

The first phase of construction and renovation was completed in 2007. Construction started in June 2006; the intention is for the first phase – which is supposed to make the airport an IATA category C airport – was completed in 2007. The European Investment Bank is providing $40M (2006) for the project and the Caribbean Development Bank has approved a loan of $11m (June 2006) for the new project.

=== Phase 1A ===
Phase 1A commenced planning in 2004 and was completed in 2007 at an estimated cost of $80M (ground-breaking took place in September 2006). This phase comprises a new departures building at the eastern end of the present terminal to accommodate expansion to the present departure concourse, security screening station with space to accommodate explosives detection equipment, out-going immigration, retail concessions and departure lounge.

Additionally a new multi-level passenger finger (pier) that enables the separation of arriving and departing passengers, as required by security regulations, was included.

Other items in this phase included:

- Nine passenger loading bridges at the new finger (pier)
- Upgraded roadway system and expanded public car park
- Major rehabilitation of the existing departures concourse and related underground services infrastructure
- Major rehabilitation and upgrading of the terminal arrivals area, including immigration hall, customs hall, arrivals arcade, arrivals duty-free shops and offices
- Replacement and upgrading of airport systems – public address, access control, flight information, baggage information, security control and other airport IT systems
- Cargo warehouse complex (the first phase of this complex, called the NMIA cargo and logistics centre, was completed in 2005)

=== Phase 1B ===
Phase 1B was completed in 2010, and cost approximately $23M. Works under this phase included:

- Further upgrading of existing buildings
- Construction of a new arrivals area
- Installation of new baggage handling facilities
- Movement of the General Aviation Centre, the fire station and other support facilities
- Airside works including the expansion of aircraft parking stands
- Extension of the cargo and maintenance taxiway

=== Phase 2 ===
Phase 2, which is the final phase of the project, commenced in 2013 and is to end in 2022. This phase will involve additional improvement and maintenance works to the terminal, landside, airfield and support areas of the facility at a cost of $9M.

== Airlines and destinations ==
=== Passenger ===
Airlines	Destinations
Air Canada Rouge	Toronto–Pearson
American Airlines	Miami
Arajet	Punta Cana, Santo Domingo–Las Américas
British Airways	London–Gatwick
Caicos Express Airways	Providenciales
Caribbean Airlines	Antigua, Nassau, New York–JFK, Port of Spain, St. Maarten, Toronto–Pearson
Cayman Airways	Grand Cayman
Copa Airlines	Panama City–Tocumen
Delta Air Lines	Atlanta; Seasonal: New York–JFK
Flair Airlines	Toronto–Pearson
InterCaribbean Airways	Barbados, Providenciales, Santiago de Cuba
JetBlue	Fort Lauderdale, New York–JFK
Liat Air	Antigua
WestJet	Toronto–Pearson

== Accidents and incidents ==
- On 10 April 1953, a Caribbean International Airways Lockheed Lodestar 18-56-23 piloted by Captain Owen Roberts lost an engine on takeoff, climbed to 100–200 feet entering a slight banking turn and crashed into the sea. A failure of the left engine which was proven to be due to the cracking of the accessory drive gear; proved to be the cause of the accident. 13 on board, including the pilot, were killed. There was only one known survivor.
- On 17 July 1960, the captain of a Vickers Viscount of Cubana de Aviación hijacked the aircraft on a flight from José Martí International Airport, Havana, to Miami International Airport, Florida. The aircraft landed at Palisadoes Airport where the captain requested political asylum.
- On 22 December 2009, American Airlines Flight 331, a Boeing 737-800, overshot the runway shortly after 10:00pm during a heavy rain storm and broke up into three pieces, finally coming to a stop approximately 15–20 feet from the sea. All passengers and crew exited the aircraft safely.

== See also ==
- List of the busiest airports in the Caribbean
