= JAGS McCartney International Airport =

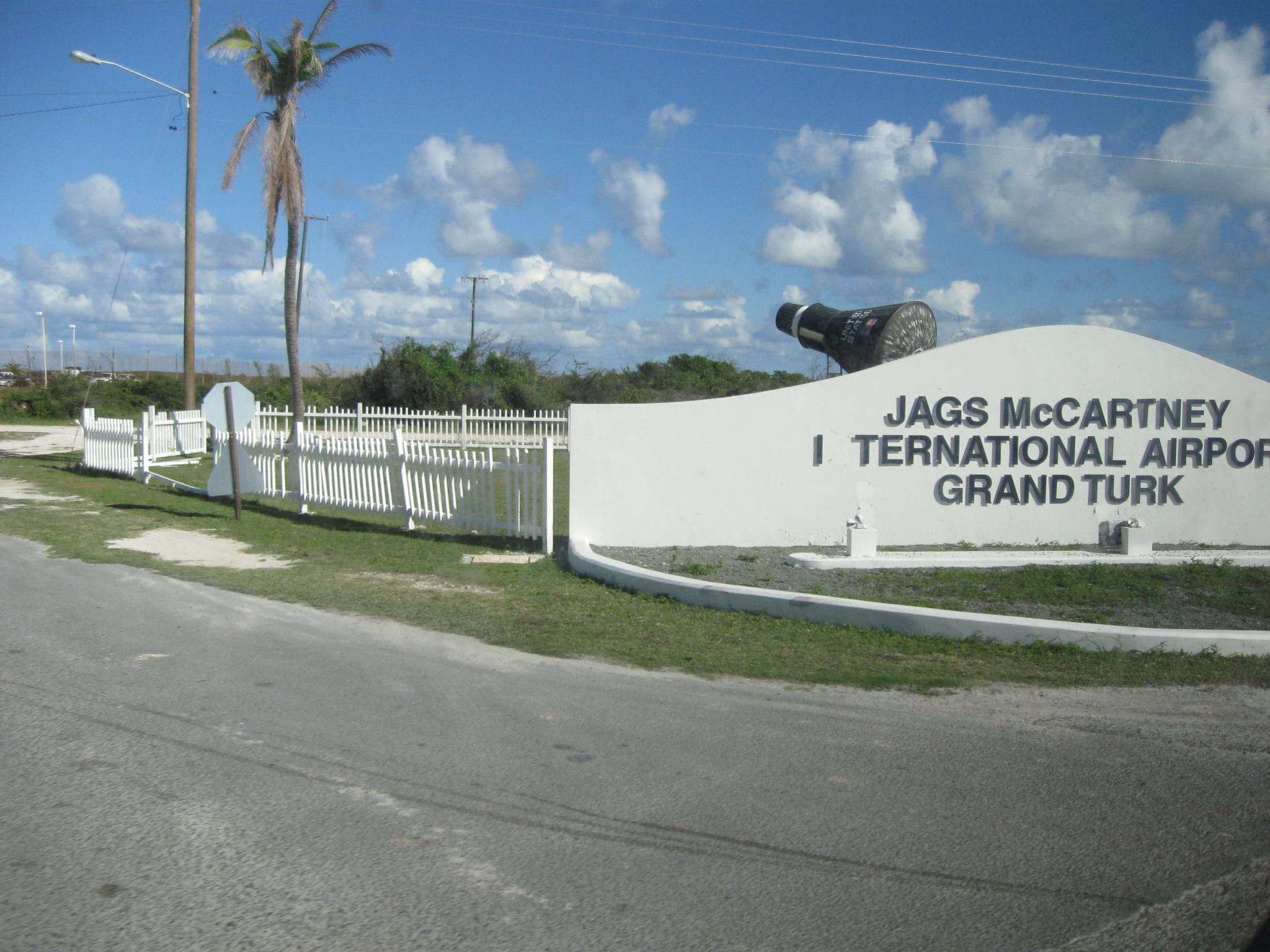
- IATA: GDT; ICAO: MBGT

Summary
- Airport type: Public
- Operator: Civil Aviation Department
- Location: Grand Turk Island,Turks and Caicos
- Elevation AMSL: 11 ft (3.4 m)
- Coordinates: 21°26′40″N 071°08′32″W
- Website: https://www.visittci.com/grand-turk-jags-mccartney-international-airport-gdt

Map
- Location in Grand Turk Island

Runways
Direction	Length		Surface
Direction	m	ft	Surface
12/30	1,939	6,361	Asphalt
- Source: DAFIF

JAGS McCartney International Airport (IATA: GDT, ICAO: MBGT), also known as Grand Turk International Airport, is an airport located 1 mile (1.6 km) south of Cockburn Town on Grand Turk in the Turks and Caicos Islands, an overseas territory of the United Kingdom. It is the second largest airport in the territory, after Providenciales International Airport.

The airport is classified as international, but it mainly serves domestic flights. Previously, it operated international flights to United States, Jamaica, Haiti and the Dominican Republic.

== History ==
The airport is named for James Alexander George Smith McCartney, the territory's first Chief Minister, who died in a plane crash in New Jersey, United States in 1980.

Bahamas Airways was serving the airport by the late 1950s with weekly flights to Nassau via an intermediate stop at Inagua operated with small de Havilland Heron prop aircraft. By the early 1960s Bahamas Airways was operating the same routing and weekly schedule with larger Douglas DC-3 prop aircraft.

During the mid 1970s, two airlines were operating international flights from Grand Turk including Mackey International Airlines with Douglas DC-6 propliner service to Miami (MIA) with continuing service to Fort Lauderdale (FLL) three days a week and Turks & Caicos Airways in association with Haiti Air Inter with direct flights to Cap-Haitien, Haiti continuing on Port au Prince, Haiti operated with Britten-Norman BN-2 Islander commuter prop aircraft. During the late 1970s, Southeast Airlines was operating direct no change of plane service to Miami (MIA) three days a week via a stop in South Caicos with a Lockheed L-188 Electra turboprop aircraft. In 1978, Trans-Jamaican Airlines was operating nonstop service once a week to Kingston with Britten-Norman Trislander prop aircraft. In 1994, Turks and Caicos Airways Ltd., which was based in Grand Turk, was operating flights with Beechcraft 1900C turboprops as well as Britten-Norman Islander and Cessna prop aircraft with flights from Cap-Haitien, Haiti and Puerto Plata, Dominican Republic in addition to local flights in the Turks and Caicos Islands including service from Middle Caicos, North Caicos, Providenciales, Salt Cay and South Caicos.

This is also where Friendship 7 launched.

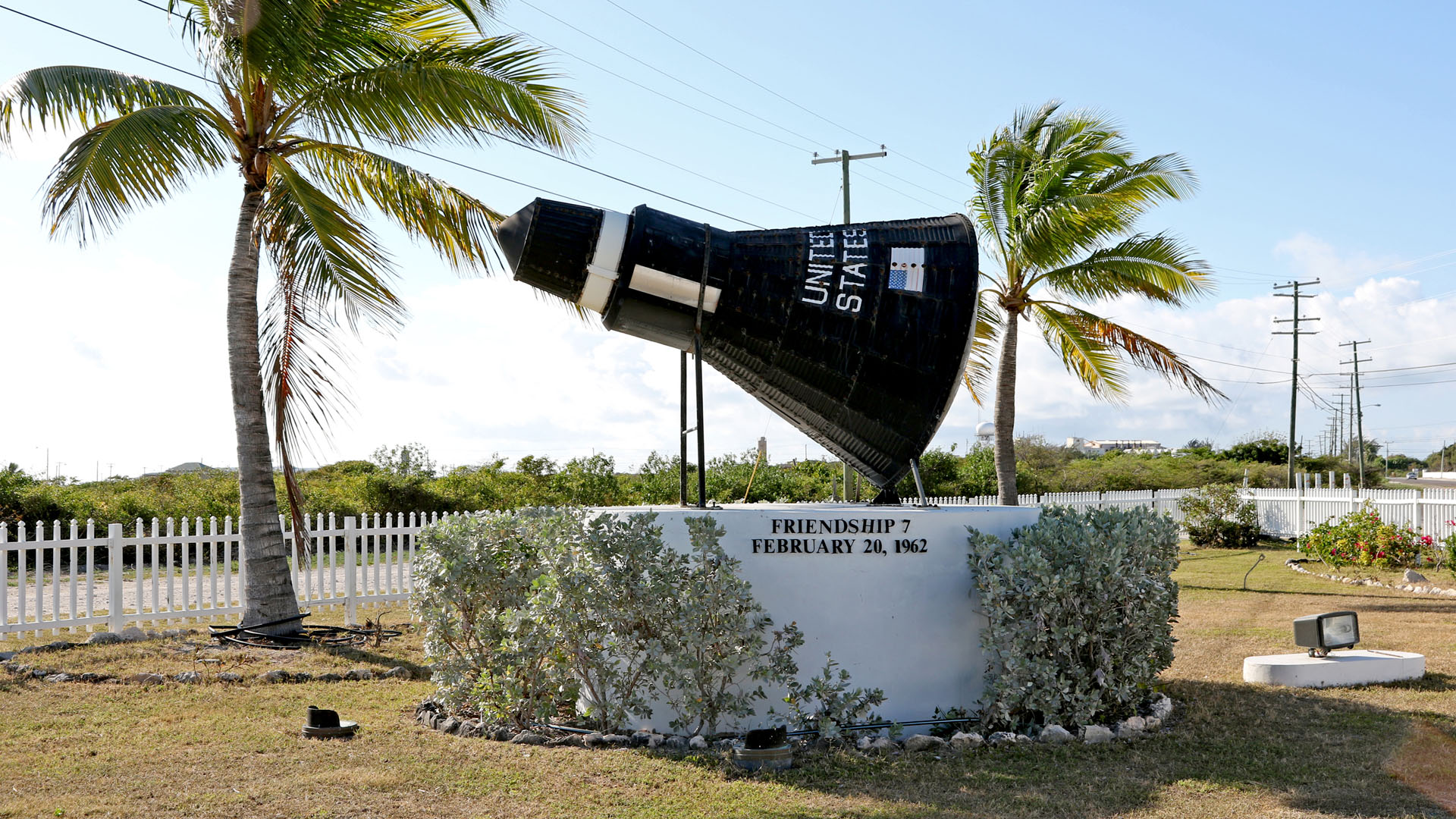
Replica of Friendship 7 at Grand Turk Airport

=== Past scheduled airline jet service ===
Grand Turk was previously served by several different airlines operating scheduled passenger jet service between the airport and Miami (MIA). In 1979, Air Florida was operating four flights a week with Boeing 737-100 jets to Miami. By 1984, Air Florida was serving Grand Turk with 737 jets on a "triangle" routing of Miami - Grand Turk - Puerto Plata - Miami four days a week. In 1985, Cayman Airways was flying Boeing 727-200 service to Miami three times a week Also in 1985, Atlantic Gulf Airlines was flying British Aircraft Corporation BAC One-Eleven service nonstop to Miami as well as direct to MIA via a stop in Providenciales. By 1989, Pan American World Airways (Pan Am) was operating nonstop Boeing 727-200 flights to Miami twice a week. In 1993-1994, Carnival Air Lines was flying Boeing 727-100 jet service to Miami twice a week via a stop in Providenciales. Also in 1994, Turks and Caicos Airways Ltd., which was based in Grand Turk, was operating Boeing 737-200 nonstops from Miami twice a week in addition to flying turboprop and prop service into several island destinations including local service within the Turks & Caicos Islands (see above).

== Facilities and aircraft ==
JAGS McCartney has the ability to handle large aircraft, such as Boeing 757 and Airbus A321 jets. The airport also houses a restaurant, rental car facilities, and free parking facilities. There is no public transportation on the island. The majority of scheduled airline service originating out of the airport are domestic flights within the Turks and Caicos Islands primarily to Providenciales International Airport (PLS) where scheduled international passenger jet service operated by a number of airlines is available. However, international and other charter flights are popular during the peak travel season into Grand Turk.

== Airlines and destinations ==
Airlines	Destinations
Caicos Express Airways	Providenciales, South Caicos, Salt Cay
InterCaribbean Airways	Providenciales
