= Wades Green and Teren Hill Important Bird Area =

Coordinates: 21°56′28″N 72°01′38″W

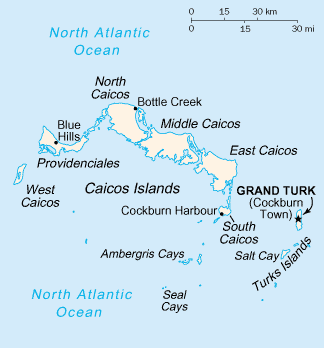
Map of the Turks and Caicos Islands showing location of North Caicos

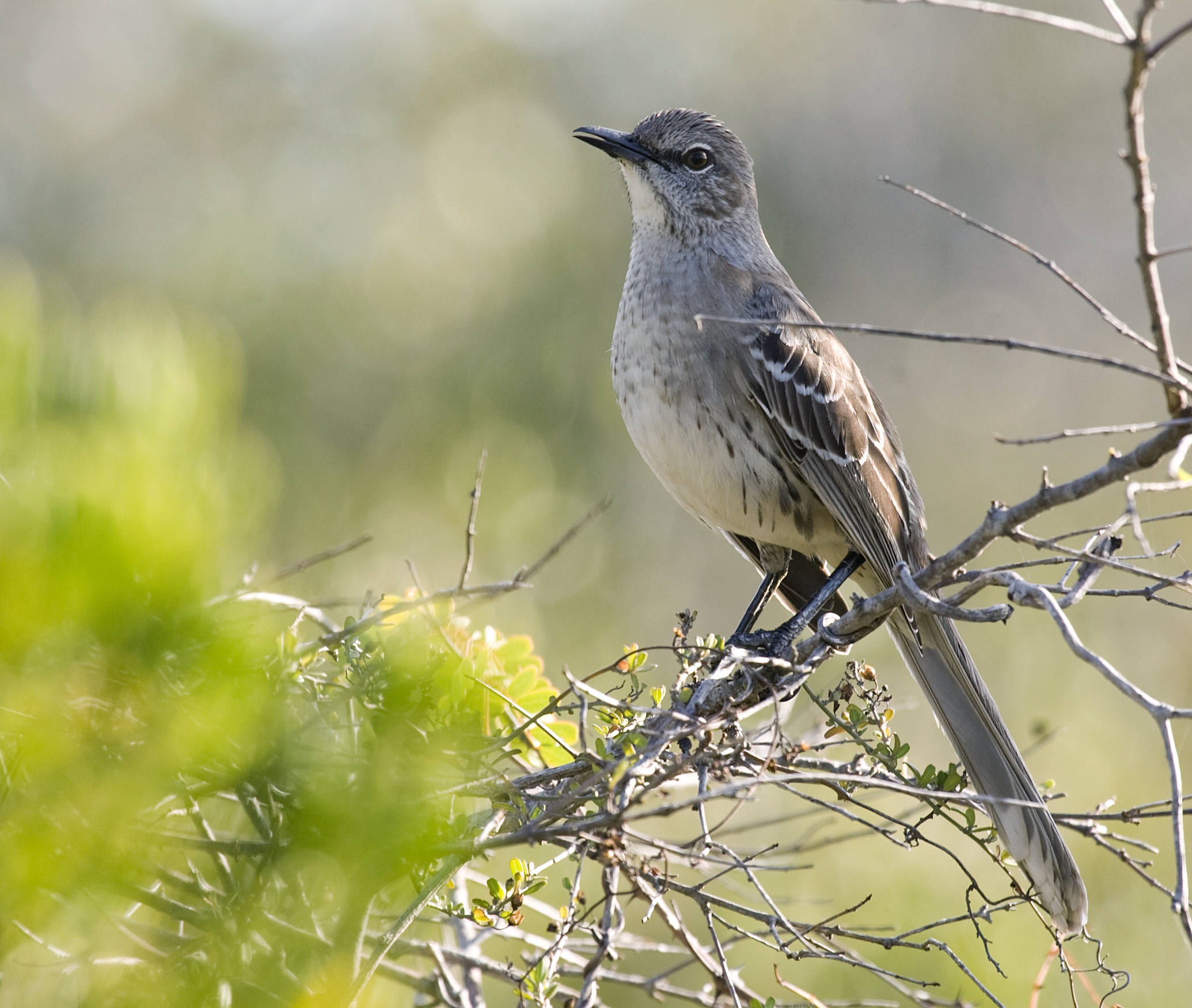
The IBA is an important site for Bahama mockingbirds

The Wades Green and Teren Hill Important Bird Area is a 226 ha tract of land on the island of North Caicos in the Turks and Caicos Islands, a British Overseas Territory in the Lucayan Archipelago of the western Atlantic Ocean. It forms one of the territory's Important Bird Areas (IBAs).

== Description ==
The IBA lies in north-west North Caicos in the vicinity of the ruins of two historic plantations, from which it derives its name. It contains much of the territory's remaining native high forest.

== History ==
As part of the end of the American Revolutionary War, the 1783 Treaty of Paris transferred Great Britain's possession of Florida to Spain in return for ownership of the Bahamas, which at the time included Turks and Caicos. Many of the Loyalist settlers in Florida did not want to live under Spanish rule and received compensatory land in Turks and Caicos. Wade Stubbs was one of the Loyalists who received land in North Caicos and developed a cotton plantation known as Bellefield and then later as Wades Green.

=== Birds ===
The IBA was identified as such by BirdLife International because it supports, populations of Bahama woodstars, thick-billed vireos, Bahama mockingbirds and pearly-eyed thrashers.
