= Caicos Express Airways =

Airline of Turks and Caicos

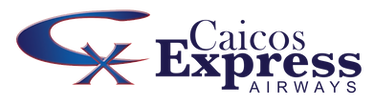
| IATA | ICAO | Call sign |
|---|---|---|
| 9Q | CXE | CAICOS |
- Founded: 2011; 15 years ago
- Hubs: Providenciales International Airport
- Secondary hubs: JAGS McCartney International Airport
- Fleet size: 5
- Destinations: 6
- Headquarters: Providenciales, Turks and Caicos Islands
- Website: turksandcaicosflights.com

Caicos Express Airways is an airline based in Providenciales, Turks and Caicos Islands. It operates scheduled domestic and international flights within the Caribbean region.

== History ==
Caicos Express Airways was founded in 2007 by Captain Registre, initially operating charter flights with a Piper Aztec PA23. The company expanded when Captain Arthur joined, adding a Cessna 402 to the fleet and broadening services to include charter business and non-critical medical transport.

In December 2011, the airline began scheduled flights within the Turks and Caicos Islands. The company's first international route, to Cap-Haïtien, Haiti, was launched in 2013. Caicos Express has since expanded its fleet and destinations, adding routes to the Dominican Republic and, in 2023, to Jamaica.

== Caribbean ==
- Turks and Caicos
  - Grand Turk - JAGS McCartney International Airport - (Secondary hub)
  - North Caicos - North Caicos Airport
  - Providenciales - Providenciales International Airport - (Main hub)
  - Salt Cay - Salt Cay Airport
  - South Caicos - South Caicos Airport
- Dominican Republic
  - Santiago - Cibao International Airport
  - Santo Domingo - Las Americas International Airport
- Haiti
  - Cap-Haitien - Hugo Chávez International Airport
- Jamaica

== Fleet ==
=== Current fleet ===
Caicos Express Airways Fleet
| Aircraft | In Fleet | Orders | Passengers | Notes |
|---|---|---|---|---|
| ATR 42-500 | 1 | 1 | 48 | (as of August 2025) |
| Beechcraft 1900C | 3 | 0 | 19 | (as of August 2025) |
| Cessna 402 | 3 | 0 | 10 | |
| Total | 7 | 1 | | |

=== Former fleet ===
The Caicos Express Airways retired fleet includes the following aircraft:

- Piper PA-23-250 Aztec
- 2 further Beechcraft 1900
