= Atlantic Gulf Airlines =

American regional airline (1983-86)

- Commenced operations: 1983; 43 years ago
- Ceased operations: 1986; 40 years ago
- Destinations: Caribbeans; Georgia
- Headquarters: St. Petersburg, Florida
- Key people: Tom Tepper; Kerry Broaddus

Atlantic Gulf Airlines was a regional airline founded by Tom Tepper and Kerry Broaddus in Florida that began operations in October 1983.

== History ==
Service started with two British-manufactured Vickers Viscount four engine turboprop airliners. Atlantic Gulf was one of very few airlines in the U.S. to operate the Viscount in scheduled passenger service (Continental Airlines and United Airlines operated Viscounts during the 1960s as did Aloha Airlines and Hawaiian Airlines). The airline began with service from Miami to St. Petersburg, Florida. By early 1984, the airlines had added Convair 580 turboprops to the fleet and was operating Miami (MIA) - St. Petersburg (PIE) - Atlanta (ATL) service. The fleet grew to three Convair 580s and cities such as Tallahassee and Fort Lauderdale were added to the route system.

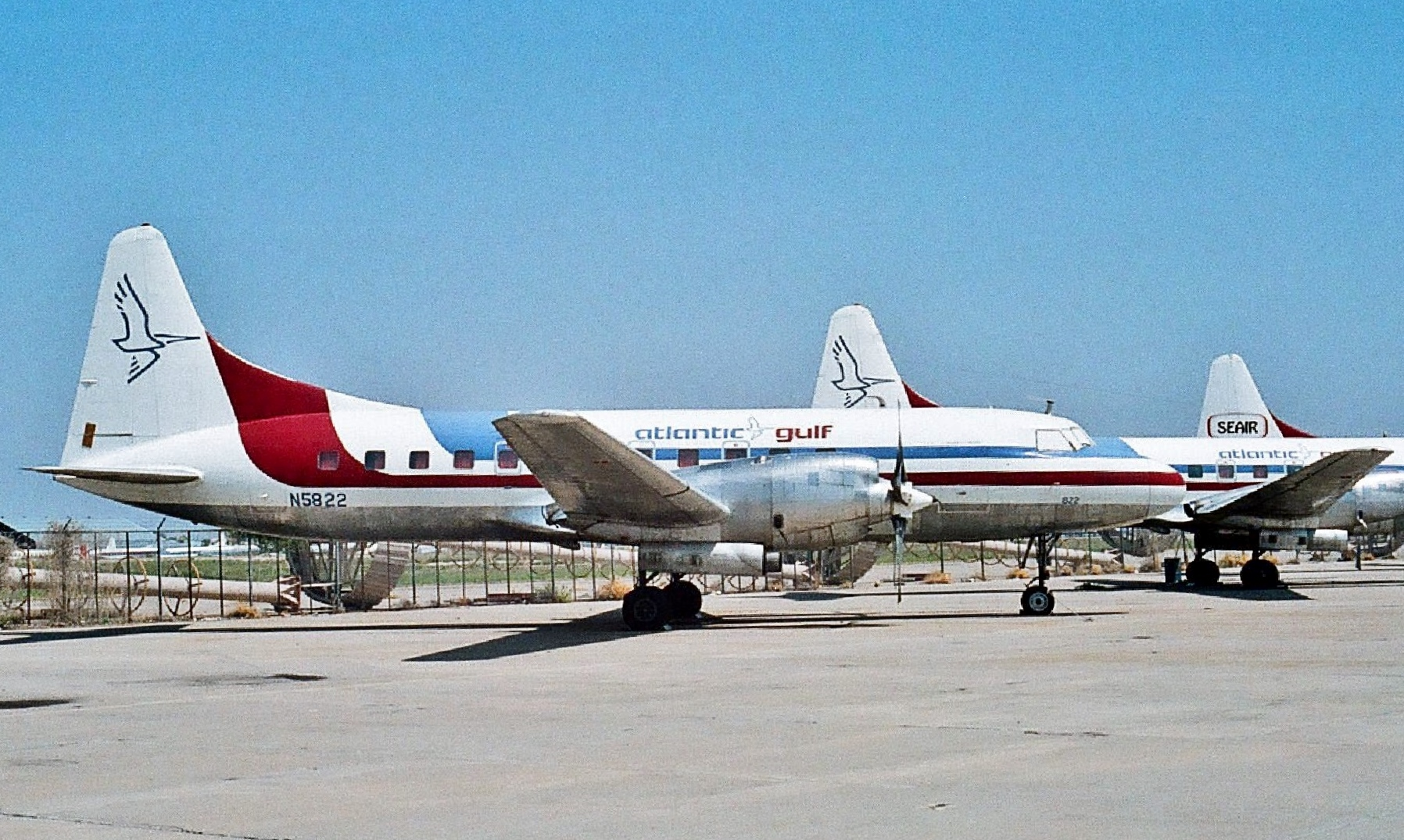
Atlantic Gulf Convair CV-580 at Tucson Airport, 1987

=== Chapter Eleven ===
The St. Petersburg (PIE) market did not work out for Atlantic Gulf and the airline went into Chapter Eleven bankruptcy proceedings. The Convair 580 turboprop planes were returned to their lessors while the airline reorganized. In an unheard of move by a small airline in the 1980s, Atlantic Gulf continued to operate using a British Aircraft Corporation BAC One-Eleven jet it acquired through a merger with the also bankrupt Air Illinois. The airline's headquarters was also moved from St. Petersburg to Tallahassee (TLH).

=== Downfall ===
The airline had acquired two former Cascade Airways BAC One-Eleven twin jets and began scheduled service from Tallahassee to Miami/Fort Lauderdale and Atlanta. This schedule was pared back when the Federal Aviation Administration (FAA) grounded the two former Cascade jets claiming that the "Stage One" noise waivers obtained from Cascade did not transfer to Atlantic Gulf. The FAA also threatened Atlantic Gulf with heavy fines because the Cascade jets were BAC One-Eleven series 400 series planes. The original Air Illinois plane and subsequent training program were for the less powerful and slightly different BAC One-Eleven series 200 series aircraft. This, combined with a heavy D check due on one of the Cascade jets, left Atlantic Gulf with one serviceable BAC One-Eleven jet for its entire system.

In addition, Piedmont Airlines had started its well equipped and well funded dedicated Florida Shuttle using comparable Fokker F28 Fellowship twinjets. Atlantic Gulf responded to this by initiating new international routes from Miami to the Caribbean. The main route was from Atlanta to Tallahassee to Miami to Grand Turk with Providenciales in the Turks and Caicos Islands also being served. Other island destinations were added but the entire system had become too dependent on one airplane.

To add more trouble to Atlantic Gulf's woes, the BAC One-Eleven that was getting a heavy check had this work halted when an unexpected high priority contract for a foreign carrier unexpectedly popped up. The battle over the "Stage One" noise waivers and the training issues had still not been resolved with the FAA. The remaining BAC One-Eleven airframe proved stalwart and did all that was asked of it but it was flying over 400 hours a month.

Taking off from a newly resurfaced runway in Miami, a piece of debris (a roughly 2 inch piece of rebar) was thrown into an engine. The takeoff was rejected without incident but the jet was grounded. Only three suitable engines were located but none were available for lease. The different and more powerful engines of the 400 series BAC One-Eleven jets were not compatible. With crushing competition inside Florida, a grounded fleet and dwindling cash resources the airlines ceased operations in 1986.

=== Transfer of noise waivers ===
The airline did have one Pyrrhic victory. Years after it folded, in a case that went before the U.S. Supreme Court, Atlantic Gulf won their lawsuit against the FAA over the transfer of Cascade Airways "Stage One" noise waivers.

== Destinations ==
Destination information is taken from Atlantic Gulf system timetables as well as from Official Airline Guide (OAG) flight schedules. Not all of these destinations were served by the airline at the same time.

- Atlanta, GA (ATL)
- Fort Lauderdale, FL (FLL)
- Grand Turk, Turks & Caicos Islands (GDT)
- Miami, FL (MIA)
- Providenciales, Turks & Caicos Islands (PLS)
- Puerto Plata, Dominican Republic (POP)
- St. Petersburg, FL (PIE)
- Tallahassee, FL (TLH)
- West Palm Beach, FL (PBI)

== Fleet ==
- BAC One-Eleven 200 acquired from Air Illinois
- BAC One-Eleven 400 acquired from Cascade Airways
- 3 Convair 580
- 2 Vickers Viscount

== See also ==
- List of defunct airlines of the United States
