= Norman B. Saunders Sr. International Airport =

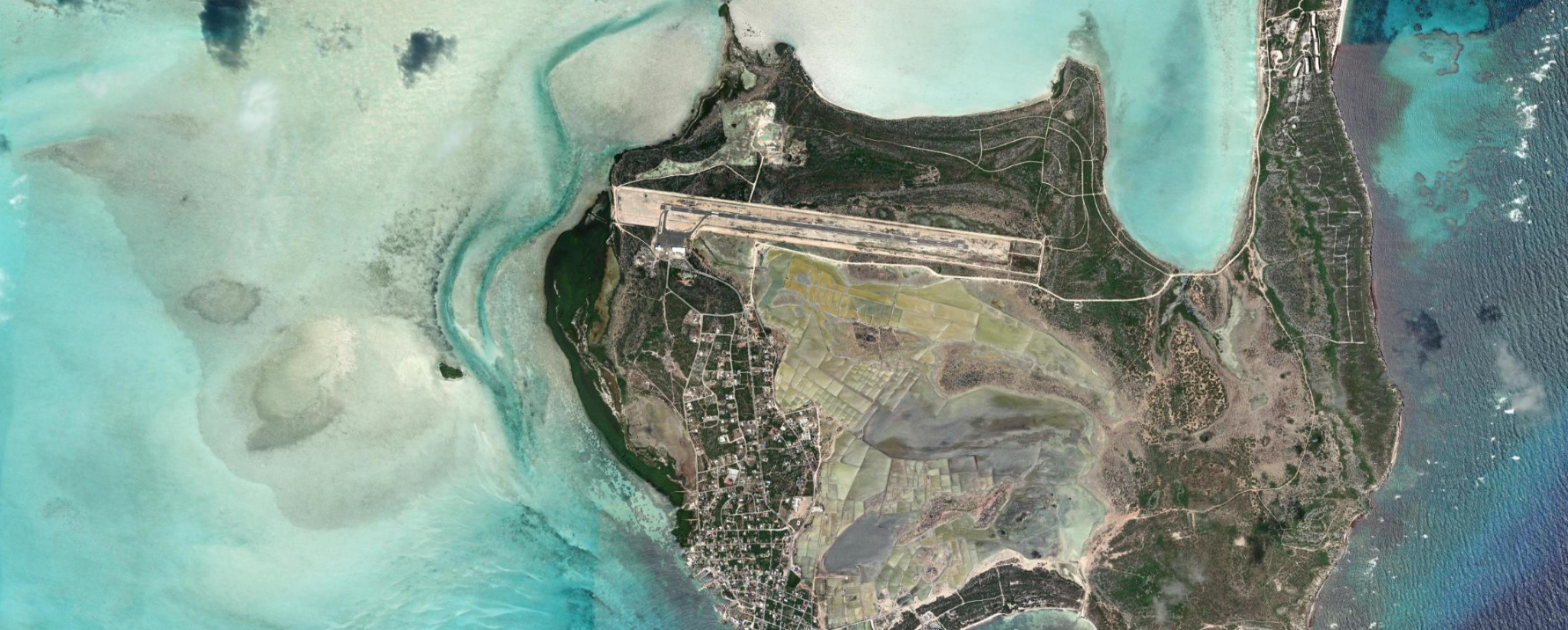
- IATA: XSC; ICAO: MBSC

Summary
- Airport type: Public
- Location: South Caicos, Turks and Caicos Islands
- Elevation AMSL: 6 ft (1.8 m)
- Coordinates: 21°30′57″N 071°31′43″W

Map
- Location in South Caicos

Runways
Direction	Length		Surface
Direction	m	ft	Surface
11/29	1,826	5,991	Asphalt
- Source: DAFIF

Norman B. Saunders Sr. International Airport (formerly South Caicos Airport) (IATA: XSC, ICAO: MBSC) is an airport serving South Caicos, the seventh largest of the Turks and Caicos Islands.

The airport is named in honour of Hon. Norman B. Saunders Sr., the 3rd Chief Minister of the Turks and Caicos Islands and the longest-serving Member of the House of Assembly in the Turks and Caicos Islands.

== Renaming ==
On May 24, 2024, the South Caicos Airport was officially renamed the Norman B. Saunders Sr. International Airport in honour of Hon. Norman B. Saunders Sr., the third Chief Minister of the Turks and Caicos Islands and the nation's longest-serving Member of Parliament. This renaming recognized Saunders’ nearly 50 years of political service, spanning from 1967 to 2016, during which he served across six decades — from the 1960s to the 2010s. Throughout his distinguished career, Saunders remained undefeated in elections, representing constituencies on South Caicos as both a Progressive National Party (PNP) candidate and as an independent candidate. He is also one of the longest-serving Members of Parliament in the Caribbean.

Saunders led the Progressive National Party to a decisive victory in the 1980 General Election, becoming Chief Minister of the Turks and Caicos Islands. He was subsequently returned as Chief Minister following the 1984 General Election, marking the territory's first consecutive electoral victories for a political leader. He is also widely recognized as the "Father of Tourism in the Turks and Caicos Islands", having been instrumental in establishing the high-end tourism model that drives the Turks and Caicos Islands' tourism industry and overall economy.

In March 2025, the Norman B. Saunders Sr. International Airport welcomed its first direct international service, with American Airlines operating flights between Miami and South Caicos (Flight AA 3815), alongside domestic connections to Providenciales and Grand Turk.

== Facilities ==
The airport is at an elevation of 6 ft (2 m) above mean sea level. It has one runway designated 11/29 with an asphalt surface measuring 1,826 m × 30 m (5,991 ft × 98 ft).

== Airlines and destinations ==
Airlines	Destinations
American Eagle	Miami
BermudAir	Seasonal: Newark (begins 20 December 2026)
Caicos Express Airways	Grand Turk, Providenciales
InterCaribbean Airways	Providenciales
