= Salt Cay, Turks Islands =

Island in the Turks and Caicos Islands

Salt Cay
- Satellite Image of Salt Cay (2024)

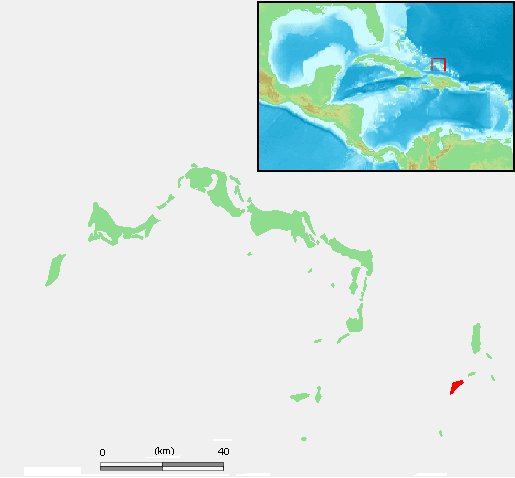
- The location of Salt Cay within the Turks and Caicos Islands

- Location within Turks and Caicos Islands Location within the Caribbean

Geography
- Location: Atlantic Ocean
- Coordinates: 21°19′30″N 71°12′30″W
- Archipelago: Lucayan Archipelago

Administration
- United Kingdom
- British Overseas Territory: Turks and Caicos Islands

Demographics
- Population: 108 (2012)

Additional information
- Time zone: EST (UTC-5)
  - Summer (DST): EDT (UTC-4)
- ISO code: TC

Salt Cay is the second largest of the Turks Islands, one of the two island groups forming of the British territory of the Turks and Caicos Islands in the Caribbean. Its area is 6.74 square kilometres (2.60 square miles). The size of the district, which also includes some unpopulated islands like Cotton Cay (1.1252 square kilometres or 0.434 square miles) nearby, is 9.1 square kilometres (3.5 square miles). The population is 108 (est. 2012), all in the district capital Balfour Town, established in 1673, on the west coast.

Salt Cay is a tiny, flat, triangular island measuring about 3.2 kilometres (2.0 miles) on a side and given over mostly to salt pans. It was once home to several hundred people, all supported by the salt industry.

Salt Cay is accessible via plane; Caicos Express Airways flies there from both Providenciales and Grand Turk islands. From Grand Turk there is also a "community ferry", which operates three times a week and takes about one hour to cover the 13-kilometre (8.1 mi) distance.

== History ==
When the Spanish conquistador-explorer Juan Ponce de León came to the Islands in 1512, they were still inhabited by Arawak Indians who disappeared afterwards due to the diseases contracted from the Europeans and forced labour imposed by them.

Bermudians came to the islands in 1673 fleeing slavery and established what was to become the principal industry for the next 300 years – the production of salt from brine. The islands came under British colonial rule in 1766.

It was Turks and Caicos salt that George Washington needed to preserve the food for his army during the American Revolutionary War and that the Canadian and American fishing fleets used to salt down their catches.

A combination of competition, costs, mismanagement and the lack of a deepwater harbour brought the salt industry in the Turks and Caicos Islands to an end. As late as the 1920s and 1930s, up to half a dozen sailing ships at a time would be anchored off Salt Cay awaiting cargo. The salt had to be ferried out to them over shallow water. Bahama Passage, a 1941 film, showed the salt industry in its final days.

Ruins from the salt operations remain on Salt Cay. The island is now popular with tourists looking for uncrowded beaches and activities like whale-watching. Scuba diving and other water sports also attract visitors. Donkeys and cattle, descendants of those worked during the salt days, roam freely.

On 7 September 2017, Hurricane Irma struck the Turks and Caicos, damaging 100% of the housing on Salt Cay.

== Facilities ==
Three small restaurants specialising in fresh seafood exist on the island. The grocery options consist of three variety shops and three gift shops.

== Humpback whales ==
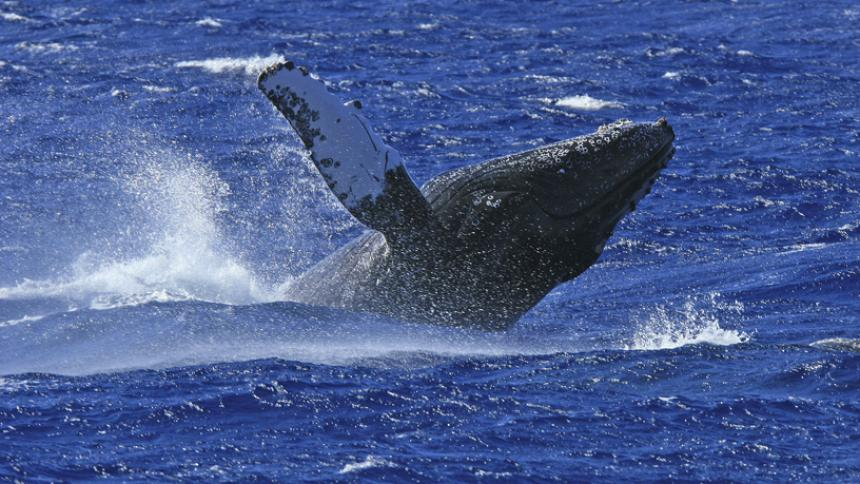
Humpback whale breaching off South Caicos

The humpback whales of Salt Cay and Silver Bank are North Atlantic humpback whales, and are some of the same whales one could encounter in the Gulf of Maine, Labrador Sea, Greenland Sea, and the Gulf of St. Lawrence.

Salt Cay is in the middle of the humpback whales' annual migratory route to the Silver Banks, a humpback mating and nursery area, north of the Dominican Republic in the Caribbean Sea. Some estimates show 3,000–5,000 humpback whales passing through the area between December and mid-April each year, making it the largest breeding and calving grounds in the world.

Great Sand Cay, about 9 miles (14 km) south of Salt Cay, has been the "emergency room" to many expecting humpback whales through the years. Humpback whales born in the waters around Great Sand Cay and their mothers, as well as other humpback whales, are often spotted both by passengers on boats and from the shores of Salt Cay.
