= Providenciales International Airport =

International airport serving on Providenciales, Turks and Caicos Islands

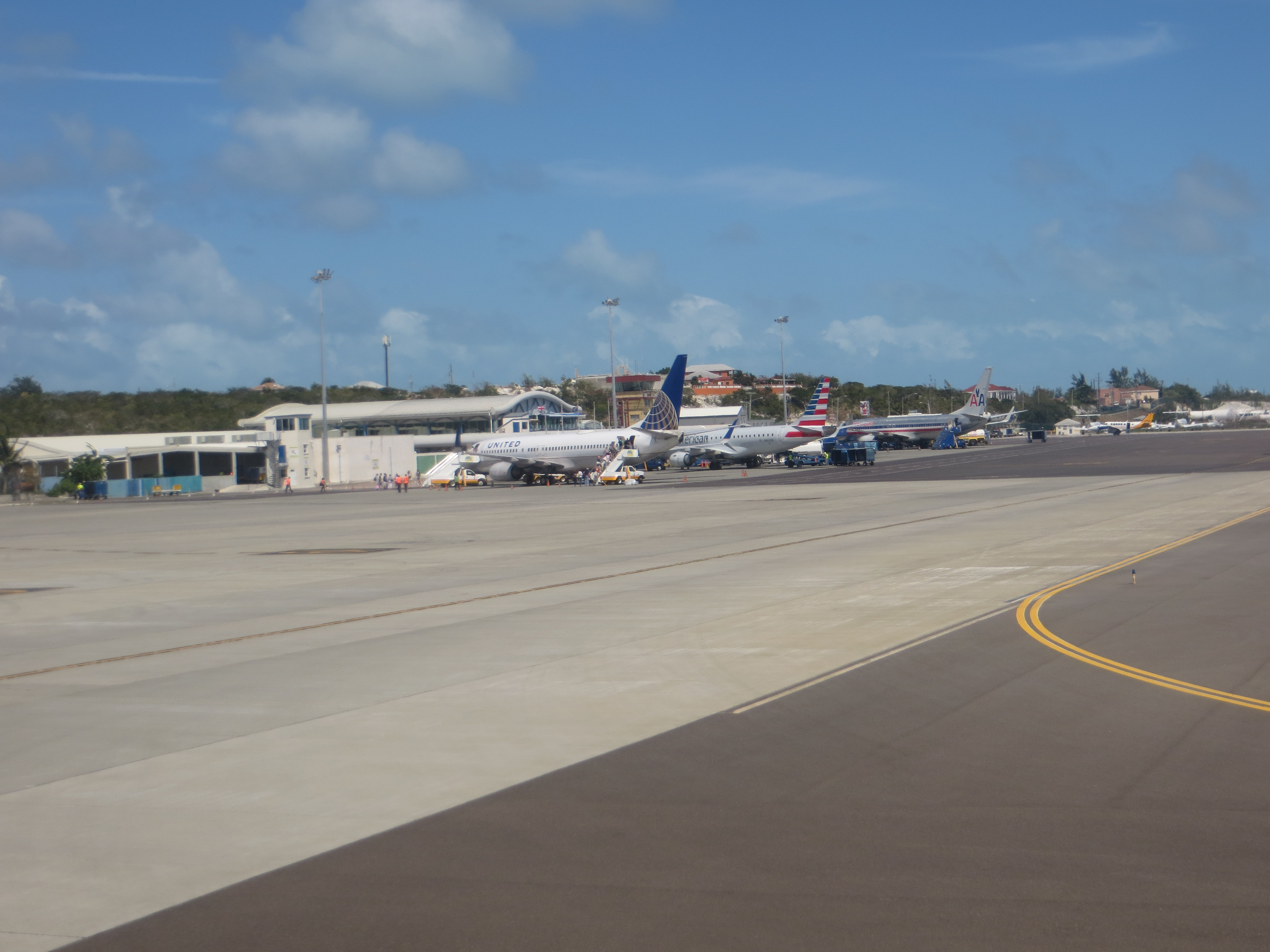
- IATA: PLS; ICAO: MBPV

Summary
- Operator: Turks & Caicos Islands Airports Authority
- Location: Providenciales, Turks and Caicos Islands
- Hub for: InterCaribbean Airways; Caicos Express Airways
- Elevation AMSL: 15 ft (4.6 m)
- Coordinates: 21°46′25″N 72°15′57″W
- Website: tciairports.com

Map
- Location in Providenciales PLS (the Caribbean) PLS (North America)

Runways
Direction	Length		Surface
Direction	m	ft	Surface
10/28	2,804	9,199	Asphalt

Statistics (2016-2017)
- Passengers: 939,814
- Source: DAFIF

Providenciales International Airport (IATA: PLS, ICAO: MBPV), on the island of Providenciales in the Caicos Islands, is the main international airport serving the Turks and Caicos Islands, a British Overseas Territory of the United Kingdom. It is operated by Turks and Caicos Islands Airports Authority (TCIAA). The territory's other international airport is JAGS McCartney International Airport on Grand Turk Island. Currently, there are more than 12,000 commercial aircraft operations per year. Locally based air carriers interCaribbean Airways and Caicos Express Airways both currently operate respective hubs at the Providenciales International Airport.

In 2023, the airport was renamed the Howard Hamilton International Airport.

== History ==
According to the Official Airline Guide (OAG), in late 1978 Southeast Airlines was the only air carrier operating scheduled passenger service to Miami (MIA) with a flight operated three days a week flown with a Lockheed L-188 Electra turboprop airliner via two intermediate en route stops in Grand Turk and South Caicos.

Air Florida was operating nonstop Boeing 737 jet service to Miami (MIA) in 1984. By 1985, Providenciales was being served by Cayman Airways with nonstop service to Miami being operated once a week with Boeing 727-200 jetliners as well as by Atlantic Gulf Airlines which was flying British Aircraft Corporation BAC One-Eleven service nonstop to Miami and also direct to MIA via a stop in Grand Turk.

Pan American World Airways (Pan Am) was also serving the airport in 1985 with Boeing 727-200 jet service nonstop to Miami twice a week. The next year, in 1986, British Caribbean Airways was operating nonstop service to Miami flown with a British Aerospace BAe 146-100 jet as part of its Tortola, British Virgin Islands - Providenciales - Miami route. In 1987, Pan Am was flying a "triangle" routing of Miami - Grand Turk - Providenciales - Miami four days a week with a Boeing 727, and in 1989 Pan Am was operating three nonstop flights a week to Miami with Boeing 727-200 jets.

By 1991, Pan Am had increased its service to four Boeing 727-200 flights a week nonstop to Miami while at the same time Cayman Airways was operating two nonstop flights a week to Miami with Boeing 737-200 jets.

From 1993 to 1994 Carnival Air Lines was operating two nonstop flights a week to Miami with Boeing 727-100 jetliners. By 1994, American Airlines was serving the airport with a single daily nonstop Boeing 757-200 flight from Miami while at the same time Turks and Caicos Airways Ltd., which was based in nearby Grand Turk, was operating Boeing 737-200 service from Miami five days a week either nonstop or via a stop in Grand Turk.

Three airlines were operating nonstop flights to Miami in early 1995: American was continuing to serve Providenciales with a daily Boeing 727-200 nonstop flight plus a Saturday only Boeing 727-200 nonstop, Turks and Caicos Airways was flying nonstop with a Boeing 737-200 four days a week, and Gray Line Air was operating nonstop Convair 580 turboprop service nine times a week.

In 1999, American was operating daily nonstop Boeing 727-200 service to Miami while at the same time Bahamasair was operating nonstop Boeing 737-200 flights to both Miami and Nassau twice a week.

By 2001, American was operating three daily nonstop flights to Miami with Boeing 737-800 aircraft and was also flying a Saturday only nonstop to New York John F. Kennedy Airport with a Boeing 737-800.

In 2023, the airport was nominally renamed the Howard Hamilton International Airport, however, the name Providenciales International Airport remains the dominant name used outside of official government sources.

== Facilities ==
The airport is at an elevation of 15 ft (5 m) above mean sea level. It has one runway designated 10/28 with an asphalt surface measuring 2,807 m × 45 m (9,209 ft × 148 ft). There were plans for the TCIAA to either extend or build a new terminal after having recently completed the extension of the runway, which currently stands at 2,807 m (9,209 ft) long. This project has now been completed and the renovation was finished by December 2014.

== Airlines and destinations ==
=== Passenger ===
Airlines	Destinations
Air Canada	Montréal–Trudeau, Toronto–Pearson
American Airlines	Charlotte, Miami; Seasonal: Boston, Chicago–O'Hare, Dallas/Fort Worth, New York–JFK, Philadelphia
Bahamasair	Nassau
BermudAir	Seasonal: Anguilla (begins 19 December 2026), Baltimore (begins 24 December 2026), Bermuda (begins 18 December 2026), Boston (begins 19 December 2026), Fort Lauderdale, Grand Cayman (begins 18 December 2026), Newark (begins 19 December 2026), Raleigh/Durham (begins 20 December 2026), St. Petersburg/Clearwater (begins 21 December 2026), Toronto–Pearson (begins 19 December 2026)
British Airways	London–Heathrow, Nassau
Caicos Express Airways	Cap-Haïtien, Grand Turk, Kingston–Norman Manley, Port-au-Prince, Santiago de los Caballeros, Santo Domingo–Las Américas, South Caicos
Delta Air Lines	Atlanta, New York–JFK; Seasonal: Boston, Detroit, Minneapolis/St. Paul
InterCaribbean Airways	Antigua, Barbados, Cap-Haïtien, Grand Turk, Havana, Kingston–Norman Manley, Nassau, Santiago de los Caballeros, Santo Domingo–Las Américas, South Caicos
JetBlue	New York–JFK; Seasonal: Boston
Porter Airlines	Seasonal: Ottawa (begins 17 December 2026), Toronto–Pearson
Sunrise Airways	Cap-Haïtien
Southwest Airlines	Orlando; Seasonal: Baltimore, Nashville (begins June 3, 2027)
Sun Country Airlines	Seasonal: Minneapolis/St. Paul
United Airlines	Newark, Washington–Dulles; Seasonal: Chicago–O'Hare, Houston–Intercontinental
WestJet	Seasonal: Toronto–Pearson
