= Index of Turks and Caicos Islands–related articles =

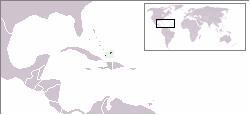
The location of the British Overseas Territory of the Turks and Caicos Islands

The following is an alphabetical list of topics related to the British Overseas Territory of the Turks and Caicos Islands.

== 0–9 ==
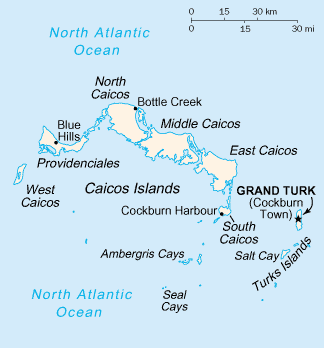
A map of the Turks and Caicos Islands

- .tc – Internet country code top-level domain for the Turks and Caicos Islands

== A ==
- Airports in the Turks and Caicos Islands
- Americas
  - North America
      - North Atlantic Ocean
      - Caribbean Sea
        - West Indies
          - Lucayan Archipelago
            - Caicos Islands
            - Turks Islands
- Anglo-America
- Atlantic Ocean
- Atlas of the Turks and Caicos Islands

== B ==
- Birds of the Turks and Caicos Islands
- British Overseas Territory of the Turks and Caicos Islands

== C ==
- Caicos Islands
- Capital of the Turks and Caicos Islands: Grand Turk (Cockburn Town) on Grand Turk Island
- Caribbean Community (CARICOM)
- Categories:
  - Category:Turks and Caicos Islands
    - Category:Buildings and structures in the Turks and Caicos Islands
    - Category:Communications in the Turks and Caicos Islands
    - Category:Turks and Caicos Islands culture
    - Category:Economy of the Turks and Caicos Islands
    - Category:Environment of the Turks and Caicos Islands
    - Category:Geography of the Turks and Caicos Islands
    - Category:Government of the Turks and Caicos Islands
    - Category:Health in the Turks and Caicos Islands
    - Category:History of the Turks and Caicos Islands
    - Category:Politics of the Turks and Caicos Islands
    - Category:Society of the Turks and Caicos Islands
    - Category:Sport in the Turks and Caicos Islands
    - Category:Transport in the Turks and Caicos Islands
    - Category:Turks and Caicos Islands people
    - Category:Turks and Caicos Islands stubs
    - Category:Turks and Caicos Islands-related lists
  - commons:Category:Turks and Caicos Islands
- Cities of the Turks and Caicos Islands
- Coat of arms of the Turks and Caicos Islands
- Cockburn Town on Grand Turk Island – Capital of the Turks and Caicos Islands since 1766
- Commonwealth of Nations
- Communications in the Turks and Caicos Islands

== D ==
- Demographics of the Turks and Caicos Islands
- Districts of the Turks and Caicos Islands

== E ==
- Economy of the Turks and Caicos Islands
- Education in the Turks and Caicos Islands
- Elections in the Turks and Caicos Islands
- British colonization of the Americas
- English language

== F ==
The Flag of the Turks and Caicos Islands

- Flag of the Turks and Caicos Islands

== G ==
- Geography of the Turks and Caicos Islands
- Government of the Turks and Caicos Islands
- Grand Turk Island
- Gross domestic product

== H ==
- History of the Turks and Caicos Islands

== I ==
- International Organization for Standardization (ISO)
  - ISO 3166-1 alpha-2 country code for Turks and Caicos Islands: TC
  - ISO 3166-1 alpha-3 country code for Turks and Caicos Islands: TCA
  - ISO 3166-2:TC region codes for Turks and Caicos Islands
- Internet in the Turks and Caicos Islands
- Islands of the Caribbean
- Islands of the Turks and Caicos Islands:
  - Bay Cay
  - Belle Isle, Turks and Caicos Islands
  - Big Ambergris Cay
  - Big Cameron Cay
  - Big Sand Cay
  - Bird Island, Turks and Caicos Islands
  - Blue Hills Island
  - Booby Island, Turks and Caicos Islands
  - Breeches Island
  - Bush Cay
  - Conch Cay
  - Dellis Cay
  - Dikish Cay
  - Donna Cay
  - East Caicos
  - East Cay
  - Fish Cays
  - Five Cays
  - Fort George Cay
  - French Cay
  - Gibb Cay
  - Grad Caicos
  - Grand Turk Island
  - Highas Cay
  - Hog Cay
  - Iguana Cay
  - Joe Grants Cay
  - Little Ambergris Cay
  - Little Water Cay
  - Long Cay, Turks and Caicos Islands
  - Major Hill Cay
  - Mangrove Cay, Turks and Caicos Islands
  - Middle Caicos
  - Middle Creek Cay
  - Middleton Cay
  - Nigger Cay
  - North Caicos
  - Parrot Cay
  - Pear Cay
  - Pelican Cay
  - Penniston Cay
  - Pine Cay
  - Plandon Cay
  - Providenciales
  - Sail Rock Island
  - Salt Cay, Turks Islands
  - Sand Cay
  - Seal Cays
  - Shot Cay
  - Six Hill Cays
  - South Caicos
  - Stubb Cay
  - The Island, Turks and Caicos Islands
  - Three Mary Cays
  - Water Cay
  - West Caicos
  - West Sand Spit Island
  - White Cay

== L ==
- Lists related to the Turks and Caicos Islands:
  - List of airports in the Turks and Caicos Islands
  - List of birds of the Turks and Caicos Islands
  - List of cities in the Turks and Caicos Islands
  - List of commissioners of the Turks and Caicos Islands
  - List of council presidents of the Turks and Caicos Islands
  - List of countries by GDP (nominal)
  - List of mammals in the Turks and Caicos Islands
  - List of newspapers in the Turks and Caicos Islands
  - List of political parties in the Turks and Caicos Islands
  - List of the Turks and Caicos Islands
  - List of Turks and Caicos Islands-related topics
  - Topic outline of the Turks and Caicos Islands
- Lucayan Archipelago

== M ==
- Middle Caicos island
- Music of the Turks and Caicos Islands

== N ==
- North America
- North Atlantic Ocean
- North Caicos island
- Northern Hemisphere

== P ==
- Political parties in the Turks and Caicos Islands
- Politics of the Turks and Caicos Islands

== R ==
- Religion in the Turks and Caicos Islands
- Royal Turks and Caicos Islands Police Force

== S ==
- Salt Cay, Turks Islands
- Scouting in the Turks and Caicos Islands

== T ==
- Topic outline of the Turks and Caicos Islands
- Turks and Caicos Islands
- Turks Islands

== U ==
- United Kingdom of Great Britain and Northern Ireland

== W ==
- West Indies
- Western Hemisphere
- Wikimedia Atlas of the Turks and Caicos Islands
- Wikipedia:WikiProject Topic outline/Drafts/Topic outline of the Turks and Caicos Islands

== See also ==
- List of Caribbean-related topics
- List of international rankings
- Lists of country-related topics
- Topic outline of geography
- Topic outline of North America
- Topic outline of the Turks and Caicos Islands
