= Outline of the Turks and Caicos Islands =

Overview of and topical guide to the Turks and Caicos Islands

The Flag of the Turks and Caicos Islands

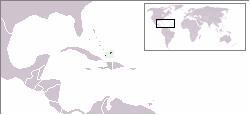
Location of the Turks and Caicos Islands

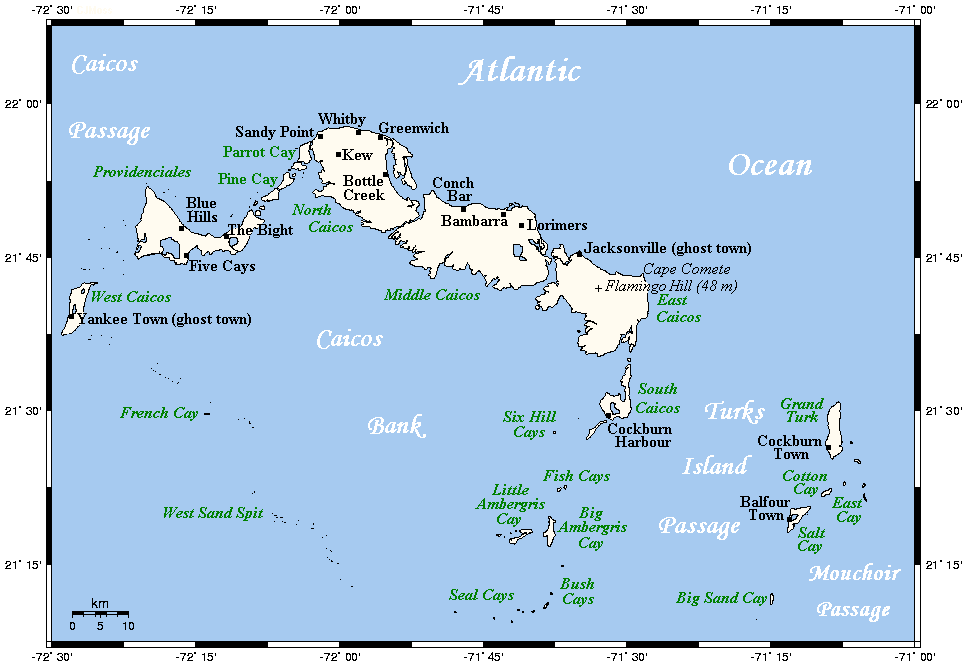
An enlargeable map of the Turks and Caicos Islands

The following outline is provided as an overview of and topical guide to the Turks and Caicos Islands:

Turks and Caicos Islands – British Overseas Territory comprising two groups of tropical islands north of the Caribbean Sea in the North Atlantic Ocean.

== General reference ==
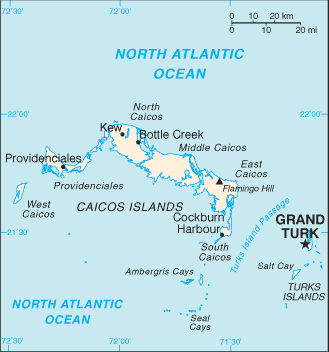
An enlargeable basic map of the Turks and Caicos Islands

- Pronunciation:
- Common English country name: The Turks and Caicos Islands
- Official English country name: Turks and Caicos Islands
- Common endonym(s):
- Official endonym(s):
- Adjectival(s): None
- Demonym(s):
- Etymology: Name of the Turks and Caicos Islands
- ISO country codes: TC, TCA, 796
- ISO region codes: See ISO 3166-2:TC
- Internet country code top-level domain: .tc

== Geography of the Turks and Caicos Islands ==
Geography of the Turks and Caicos Islands

- The Turks and Caicos Islands are: A British Overseas Territory
- Location:
  - Northern Hemisphere and Western Hemisphere
    - North America (though not on the mainland)
  - Atlantic Ocean
    - North Atlantic Ocean
      - Caribbean (West Indies)
  - Time zone: Eastern Standard Time (UTC-05), Eastern Daylight Time (UTC-04)
  - Land boundaries: none
    - High: Blue Hills on the island of Providenciales 49 m (161 ft)
    - Low: North Atlantic Ocean 0 m
  - Coastline: North Atlantic Ocean 389 km
- Population of the Turks and Caicos Islands:
- Area of the Turks and Caicos Islands:
- Atlas of the Turks and Caicos Islands

=== Environment of the Turks and Caicos Islands ===
- Climate of the Turks and Caicos Islands
- Renewable energy in the Turks and Caicos Islands
- Geology of the Turks and Caicos Islands
- Protected areas of the Turks and Caicos Islands
  - Biosphere reserves in the Turks and Caicos Islands
  - National parks of the Turks and Caicos Islands
- Wildlife of the Turks and Caicos Islands
  - Fauna of the Turks and Caicos Islands
    - Birds of the Turks and Caicos Islands
    - Mammals of the Turks and Caicos Islands

==== Natural geographical features of the Turks and Caicos Islands ====
- Islands of the Turks and Caicos Islands
- Lakes of the Turks and Caicos Islands
- Mountains of the Turks and Caicos Islands
  - Volcanoes in the Turks and Caicos Islands
- Rivers of the Turks and Caicos Islands
  - Waterfalls of the Turks and Caicos Islands
- Valleys of the Turks and Caicos Islands
- World Heritage Sites in the Turks and Caicos Islands: None

==== Ecoregions of the Turks and Caicos Islands ====
List of ecoregions in the Turks and Caicos Islands

==== Administrative divisions of the Turks and Caicos Islands ====
Administrative divisions of the Turks and Caicos Islands

Districts of the Turks and Caicos Islands

- Providenciales (including West Caicos)
- North Caicos
- Middle Caicos
- South Caicos (including East Caicos)
- Grand Turk
- Salt Cay, Turks Islands

=== Demography of the Turks and Caicos Islands ===
Demographics of the Turks and Caicos Islands

== Government and politics of the Turks and Caicos Islands ==
Politics of the Turks and Caicos Islands

- Form of government: parliamentary representative democratic dependency
- Capital of the Turks and Caicos Islands: Grand Turk (Cockburn Town)
- Elections in the Turks and Caicos Islands
- Political parties in the Turks and Caicos Islands
  - 2009 Corruption scandal

=== Branches of the government of the Turks and Caicos Islands ===
Government of the Turks and Caicos Islands

==== Executive branch of the government of the Turks and Caicos Islands ====
- Head of state: Monarch of the United Kingdom, King Charles III
  - Monarch's representative: Governor of the Turks and Caicos Islands, Dileeni Daniel-Selvaratnam
- Head of government: Premier of the Turks and Caicos Islands, Washington Misick
- Cabinet of the Turks and Caicos Islands

==== Legislative branch of the government of the Turks and Caicos Islands ====
- Turks and Caicos Islands House of Assembly (unicameral)
  - Suspended, powers delegated to Governor

==== Judicial branch of the government of the Turks and Caicos Islands ====
Court system of the Turks and Caicos Islands

- Supreme Court of the Turks and Caicos Islands

=== Foreign relations of the Turks and Caicos Islands ===
- Diplomatic missions in the Turks and Caicos Islands
- Diplomatic missions of the Turks and Caicos Islands

==== International organization membership ====
The government of the Turks and Caicos Islands is a member of:

- Caribbean Community and Common Market (Caricom) (associate)
- Caribbean Development Bank (CDB)
- International Criminal Police Organization (Interpol) (subbureau)
- Universal Postal Union (UPU)

=== Law and order in the Turks and Caicos Islands ===
Law of the Turks and Caicos Islands

- Constitution of the Turks and Caicos Islands
- Crime in the Turks and Caicos Islands
- Human rights in the Turks and Caicos Islands
  - LGBT rights in the Turks and Caicos Islands
  - Freedom of religion in the Turks and Caicos Islands
- Law enforcement in the Turks and Caicos Islands

=== Military of the Turks and Caicos Islands ===
Military of the Turks and Caicos Islands

- Command
  - Commander-in-chief: King Charles III
    - Ministry of Defence of the Turks and Caicos Islands
- Forces
  - Army of the Turks and Caicos Islands
  - Navy of the Turks and Caicos Islands
  - Air Force of the Turks and Caicos Islands
  - Special forces of the Turks and Caicos Islands
- Military history of the Turks and Caicos Islands
- Military ranks of the Turks and Caicos Islands

=== Local government in the Turks and Caicos Islands ===
Local government in the Turks and Caicos Islands

== History of the Turks and Caicos Islands ==
History of the Turks and Caicos Islands

- Timeline of the history of the Turks and Caicos Islands
- Current events of the Turks and Caicos Islands
- Military history of the Turks and Caicos Islands

== Culture of the Turks and Caicos Islands ==
Culture of the Turks and Caicos Islands

- Architecture of the Turks and Caicos Islands
- Cuisine of the Turks and Caicos Islands
- Festivals in the Turks and Caicos Islands
- Languages of the Turks and Caicos Islands
- Media in the Turks and Caicos Islands
- National symbols of the Turks and Caicos Islands
  - Coat of arms of the Turks and Caicos Islands
  - Flag of the Turks and Caicos Islands
  - National anthem of the Turks and Caicos Islands
- People of the Turks and Caicos Islands
- Public holidays in the Turks and Caicos Islands
- Records of the Turks and Caicos Islands
- Religion in the Turks and Caicos Islands
  - Christianity in the Turks and Caicos Islands
  - Hinduism in the Turks and Caicos Islands
  - Islam in the Turks and Caicos Islands
  - Judaism in the Turks and Caicos Islands
  - Sikhism in the Turks and Caicos Islands
- World Heritage Sites in the Turks and Caicos Islands: None

=== Art in the Turks and Caicos Islands ===
- Art in the Turks and Caicos Islands
- Cinema of the Turks and Caicos Islands
- Literature of the Turks and Caicos Islands
- Music of the Turks and Caicos Islands
- Television in the Turks and Caicos Islands
- Theatre in the Turks and Caicos Islands

=== Sports in the Turks and Caicos Islands ===
Sports in the Turks and Caicos Islands

- Football in the Turks and Caicos Islands

== Economy and infrastructure of the Turks and Caicos Islands ==
Economy of the Turks and Caicos Islands

- Economic rank, by nominal GDP (2007): 170th (one hundred and seventieth)
- Agriculture in the Turks and Caicos Islands
- Banking in the Turks and Caicos Islands
  - National Bank of the Turks and Caicos Islands
- Communications in the Turks and Caicos Islands
  - Internet in the Turks and Caicos Islands
- Companies of the Turks and Caicos Islands
- Currency of the Turks and Caicos Islands: Dollar
  - ISO 4217: USD
- Energy in the Turks and Caicos Islands
  - Energy policy of the Turks and Caicos Islands
  - Oil industry in the Turks and Caicos Islands
- Mining in the Turks and Caicos Islands
- Tourism in the Turks and Caicos Islands
- Transport in the Turks and Caicos Islands
- the Turks and Caicos Islands Stock Exchange

== Education in the Turks and Caicos Islands ==
Education in the Turks and Caicos Islands

== Infrastructure of the Turks and Caicos Islands ==
- Health care in the Turks and Caicos Islands
- Transportation in the Turks and Caicos Islands
  - Airports in the Turks and Caicos Islands
  - Rail transport in the Turks and Caicos Islands
  - Roads in the Turks and Caicos Islands
- Water supply and sanitation in the Turks and Caicos Islands

== See also ==
Turks and Caicos Islands

- Index of Turks and Caicos Islands–related articles
- List of international rankings
- Outline of geography
- Outline of North America
- Outline of the United Kingdom
