= List of cities in the Turks and Caicos Islands =

This is a list of cities in the Turks and Caicos Islands:

- Back Salina
- Bottle Creek
- Breezy Brae
- Chalk Sound
- Cockburn Harbour (South Caicos Town)
- Cockburn Town
- Discovery Bay
- Downtown
- Five Cays
- Grace Bay
- Great Salina
- Honda Road
- Juba
- Kew
- Kew Town
- Leeward
- Long Bay Hill
- North Creek
- Out North
- Overback
- Parrot Cay
- Salt Cay
- Sandy Point
- The Bight
- The Ridge
- Venetian Road
- West Road
- Wheeland
- Whitby
