= .tc =

Internet country-code top level domain for Turks and Caicos Islands

- Introduced: 27 January 1997
- TLD type: Country code top-level domain
- Status: Active
- Registry: NIC TC
- Sponsor: Melrex TC
- Intended use: Entities connected with Turks and Caicos Islands
- Actual use: Used by a number of sites, a few of which are in Turks and Caicos Islands. Marketed commercially for use in Turkish sites; can be registered and used for any purpose.
- Registration restrictions: None
- Structure: Registrations are available directly at second level
- Dispute policies: Unknown
- Registry website: www.nic.tc/index.php

.tc is the Internet country code top-level domain (ccTLD) for Turks and Caicos Islands. Since T.C. also stands for Türkiye Cumhuriyeti ('Republic of Turkey'), the domain is used by some Turkish sites as well. The .tc TLD was registered in January 1997.

== Second-Level Domains ==
In addition to the direct .tc domains offered by the registry, there is also a small range of second-level domains that a client can register under:

- .com.tc
- .net.tc
- .org.tc
- .pro.tc

== See also ==
- Internet in the Turks and Caicos Islands
- Internet in the United Kingdom
- .uk
