= Holy Cross Church, Cockburn Town =

Holy Cross Church
- Holy Cross Church
- 21°27′15″N 71°08′39″W
- Location: Cockburn Town
- Country: Turks and Caicos Islands; United Kingdom
- Denomination: Roman Catholic Church

The Holy Cross Church is a religious building that is affiliated with the Catholic Church and is located in Osborne Road in the city of Cockburn Town the largest in the Grand Turk Island and the capital of the British overseas territory of the Turks and Caicos Islands in the Antilles.

The church is governed by the Roman or Latin rite and depends on the mission sui juris of the Turks and Caicos Islands (Missio Sui Iuris Turcensium et Caicensium) suffragan of the Archdiocese of Nassau and was established in 1984 under the pontificate of John Paul II.

Because of the ethnic diversity of the congregation, the church offers religious services in English, Creole and Spanish.

== See also ==
- Roman Catholicism in the United Kingdom
- Holy Cross Church
