= Dellis Cay =

Island in the Turks and Caicos Islands

- Location of Dellis Cay within the Turks and Caicos Islands

- Location within Turks and Caicos Islands Location within the Caribbean

Geography
- Location: Atlantic Ocean
- Coordinates: 21.899°N 72.071°W
- Archipelago: Lucayan Archipelago

Administration
- United Kingdom
- British Overseas Territory: Turks and Caicos Islands

Additional information
- Time zone: EST (UTC-5)
  - Summer (DST): EDT (UTC-4)
- ISO code: TC

Dellis Cay is a 560-acre (2.3 km^{2}) private island located in the Turks and Caicos Islands archipelago.

This island sits south of Parrot Cay and north of Pine Cay and can be easily noted in the chain of Caicos Islands. Dellis Cay is located a few miles from Providenciales and is accessible by a 20-minute boat ride. The island got its name from the Dellis family who lived on the island and earned their living sponge farming in the 1950s. In addition to being known for sponge farming and conching, Dellis Cay is also known for its large collection of island shells that can be found along its shoreline. A real estate project "The Residences at Mandarin Oriental Dellis Cay" was expected to open in the middle of 2010, but the project went bankrupt in early 2010 and construction was halted. In early 2011, the project was cancelled due to financial problems.
