= Religion in the Turks and Caicos Islands =

The majority of the population of the Turks and Caicos Islands are Christian. They include Protestant 72.8%, Baptists 35.8%, Church of God 11.7%, Roman Catholics 11.4%, Anglicans 10%, Methodists 9.3%, Seventh-Day Adventists 6%, Jehovah's Witnesses 1.8%, and Other 14%

== History ==
=== Christianity ===
==== Baptist ====
The Baptist denomination was organized in the Turks and Caicos Islands in 1835 with its first church located in Grand Turk. Today the Baptist churches operate under the guidance of the Turks and Caicos Islands Baptist Union.

==== Seventh-day Adventist ====
The first set of Sabbath keepers were discovered in the Turks and Caicos Islands on the island of Grand Turk in 1906 by a Jamaican colporteur (religious book salesman) as he sold books. The church's main periodical 'The Review and Herald' of 16 November 1905 noted that "A woman on one of the Turks Islands at the turn of the twentieth century had come to recognize the seventh-day Sabbath through reading her Bible".

In 1945 the territory saw the establishment of a permanent presence of the SDA church when Clyde Nebblett, another colporteur, migrated to Grand Turk with his wife and began a small prayer group that met in their home. Later that year the island of Grand Turk was devastated by the 1945 Homestead hurricane. This forced the Nedletts to move to Providenciales in the community of Blue Hills where 26 individuals were baptized through their efforts. In December of the same year the Turks and Caicos Islands along with Mayaguana of the Bahamas were organized into the Salt Cays Mission. In 1947 the believers on Grand Turk were organized into a church after an evangelistic campaign and Pastor Gordon Prenier purchased a warehouse and transformed it into the first Adventist Church building in the Turks and Caicos. Between 1950 and 1988 the territory fluctuated between mission and district categorization. "In January 1988 it reverted to mission status under the direction of West Indies Union".[4]When the mission was organized, it became a part of the West Indies Union Conference. West Indies Union comprised the conferences in Jamaica, the Bahamas, the Turks and Caicos Islands Mission, and the Cayman Islands Conference.

In November 2010 at Northern Caribbean University in Mandeville, Jamaica, West Indies Union was dissolved and gave birth to the Atlantic Caribbean Union Mission and the Jamaica Union Conference. "The new configuration will see the formation of the Atlantic Caribbean Union Mission, comprising four Fields: the Bahamas Conference (now South Bahamas Conference), the North Bahamas Conference, the Cayman Islands Conference, and the Turks and Caicos Islands Mission, with approximately 25,000 members".

Seventh-day Adventism has moved in sync with the population growth of the Turks and Caicos Islands, hence Providenciales, the economic hub of the country has become the island that has seen the most growth over the years.

There are 10 churches in the Turks and Caicos Islands. Grand Turk has (2) Ebenezer and Antioch churches. Providenciales has (5) Bethel, Blue Hills, Ephesus, Filadelfia, Five Cays churches. There is a church on Salt Cay, Kews on North Caicos, and Maranatha on South Caicos.

==== Anglicanism ====
The Turks and Caicos Islands belong to the Anglican Diocese of the Bahamas and the Turks and Caicos Islands within the Church in the Province of the West Indies. The Anglican Church has a significant presence in the islands and among many tourists.

==== Latter-Day Saints ====
As of January 2009, The Church of Jesus Christ of Latter-day Saints (Mormons) were officially established in the islands. However, the islands are under the jurisdiction of the New Providence, Bahamas District. Until August 2006, the district was presided over by mission president of the Florida Ft Lauderdale Mission. After August 2006, the Bahamas and Turks and Caicos were reassigned to the Jamaica Kingston Mission.

==== Roman Catholicism ====
Prior to 1984, Turks and Caicos Islands was a part of Archdiocese of Nassau in the Bahamas. In 1984, it became a mission sui iuris (Independent Mission), the first Ecclesiastical Superior being Archbishop Lawrence Aloysius Burke. During that time the islands were served by a number of priests who stayed anywhere from a few months to a year and a half.

In the three years prior to 1998 the islands were served by a priest who came for some eight months of the year. The remaining six months of those last three years there was no priest present on the islands.

July 1998, at the request of the Holy See, the Archbishop of Newark provided two priests to serve on a full-time basis the Catholic community of the Turks and Caicos Islands. In the Fall of 1998 the Archbishop of Newark, Theodore McCarrick, assumed responsibility as Ecclesiastical Superior of the Mission Sui Iuris of Turks and Caicos Islands. On 9 October 2001 The Most Reverend John J. Myers succeeded Cardinal McCarrick as Archbishop and as Ecclesiastical Superior. Presently serving the Mission is the Reverend Monsignor Ronald J. Rozniak, the Archbishop's Vicar General for the mission, and two parochial priests.

There is a Holy Cross Church in Cockburn Town.

=== Islam ===
There are about 60 Muslims living in Turks and Caicos Islands. There also a Muslim organisation present named Turks and Caicos Muslim Association (TCIMA).

=== Judaism ===
There is a small community, numbering about 50 in 2019, with a Chabad House in Providenciales, served by the Hasidic Rabbi Shmulik Berkowitz. He runs services for both the native population and tourists.
