= Geology of the Turks and Caicos Islands =

The geology of Turks and Caicos includes the Turks and Caicos Bank, which together with the Florida-Bahamas Platform is a section of continental crust rifted away from North America during the rifting open of the Atlantic Ocean. Triassic sedimentary and volcanic rocks are inferred based on similar rocks in the Bahamas, overlain by Jurassic, Cretaceous and Paleogene limestone. During a drop in sea level during the Pleistocene glaciations, limestone was exposed as plateaus as sand dunes accumulated atop them and a karst landscape developed with caves and blue holes.
