= List of newspapers in the Turks and Caicos Islands =

Below is a list of newspapers published at some point in Turks and Caicos Islands.

== Weekly ==
- Turks and Caicos Free Press
- Turks and Caicos Sun
- Turks and Caicos Weekly News (published since 1982, also online since 2007)

== Online ==
- Newsline TCI
