= Whitby, Turks and Caicos Islands =

Village in Turks and Caicos Islands, United Kingdom

Whitby
- Village
- Location within Turks and Caicos Islands Location within the Caribbean
- Coordinates: 21.954°N 71.962°W
- Country: United Kingdom
- Overseas territory: Turks and Caicos Islands
- District: North Caicos

Population (1990)
  - Village: 169
- Climate: BSh

Whitby is a village located on the island of North Caicos in the Turks and Caicos Islands, a British Overseas Territory. It is the northernmost settlement in the territory. Whitby consists of a few small houses, shops, vacation rental villas, restaurants, and a small hotel. The village is named after Whitby in Yorkshire, northern England.

== History ==
Similar to other nearby settlements in North Caicos, the village was once home to Loyalist plantations in the aftermath of the American Revolutionary War. One such notable plantation was Greenwich hill, that was owned by Stephen Delancy, a Lieutenant Colonel in the British Army. The village shares the name with Whitby, England.
