= ISO 3166-2:TC =

Entry for the Turks and Caicos Islands in ISO 3166-2

ISO 3166-2:TC is the entry for the Turks and Caicos Islands in ISO 3166-2, part of the ISO 3166 standard published by the International Organization for Standardization (ISO), which defines codes for the names of the principal subdivisions (e.g., provinces or states) of all countries coded in ISO 3166-1.

Currently no ISO 3166-2 codes are defined in the entry for the Turks and Caicos Islands.

The Turks and Caicos Islands are officially assigned the ISO 3166-1 alpha-2 code TC.

== See also ==
- Subdivisions of the Turks and Caicos Islands
