= Flag of the Turks and Caicos Islands =

- Flag of the Turks and Caicos Islands
- Use: Civil and state flag, state ensign
- Proportion: 1:2
- Adopted: 7 November 1968 (modified coat of arms on 25 January 1999)
- Design: A Blue Ensign with the Union Flag in the canton and the coat of arms of the Turks and Caicos Islands in the fly half.

The current flag of the Turks and Caicos Islands was adopted on 7 November 1968, and modified in 1999. Prior to this, the islands had several different flags either proposed or utilised.

Nevertheless, the Turks and Caicos Islands did not form a separate colony for the vast majority of this time. Instead, the islands were a dependency of Jamaica until 1959. In 1959, the islands became a separate colony but until 1962 and the independence of Jamaica, the Governor of Jamaica remained the Governor of the Turks and Caicos Islands. Between 1962 and 1965, the Administrator of the Turks and Caicos Islands reported directly to London and then, between 1965 and 1973, the administrator was subordinate to the Governor of the Bahamas, who was also Governor of the Turks and Caicos Islands. In 1973, when The Bahamas became independent, the position of administrator became governor.

== Description ==
Shield elements
Detailed view of the shield, with queen conch shell, Caribbean spiny lobster and Turk's cap cactus

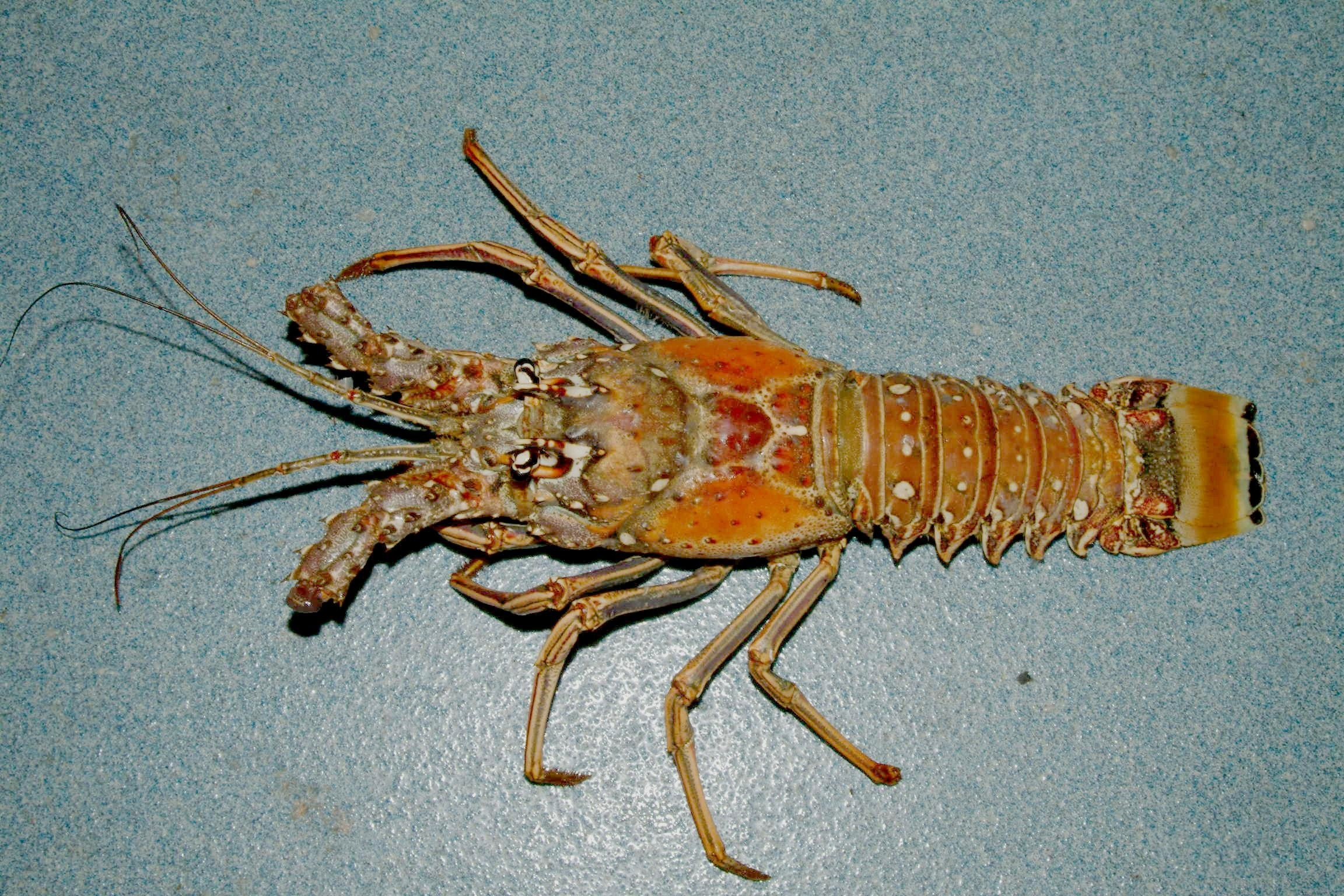
Caribbean spiny lobster (Panulirus argus) - seen with ten legs

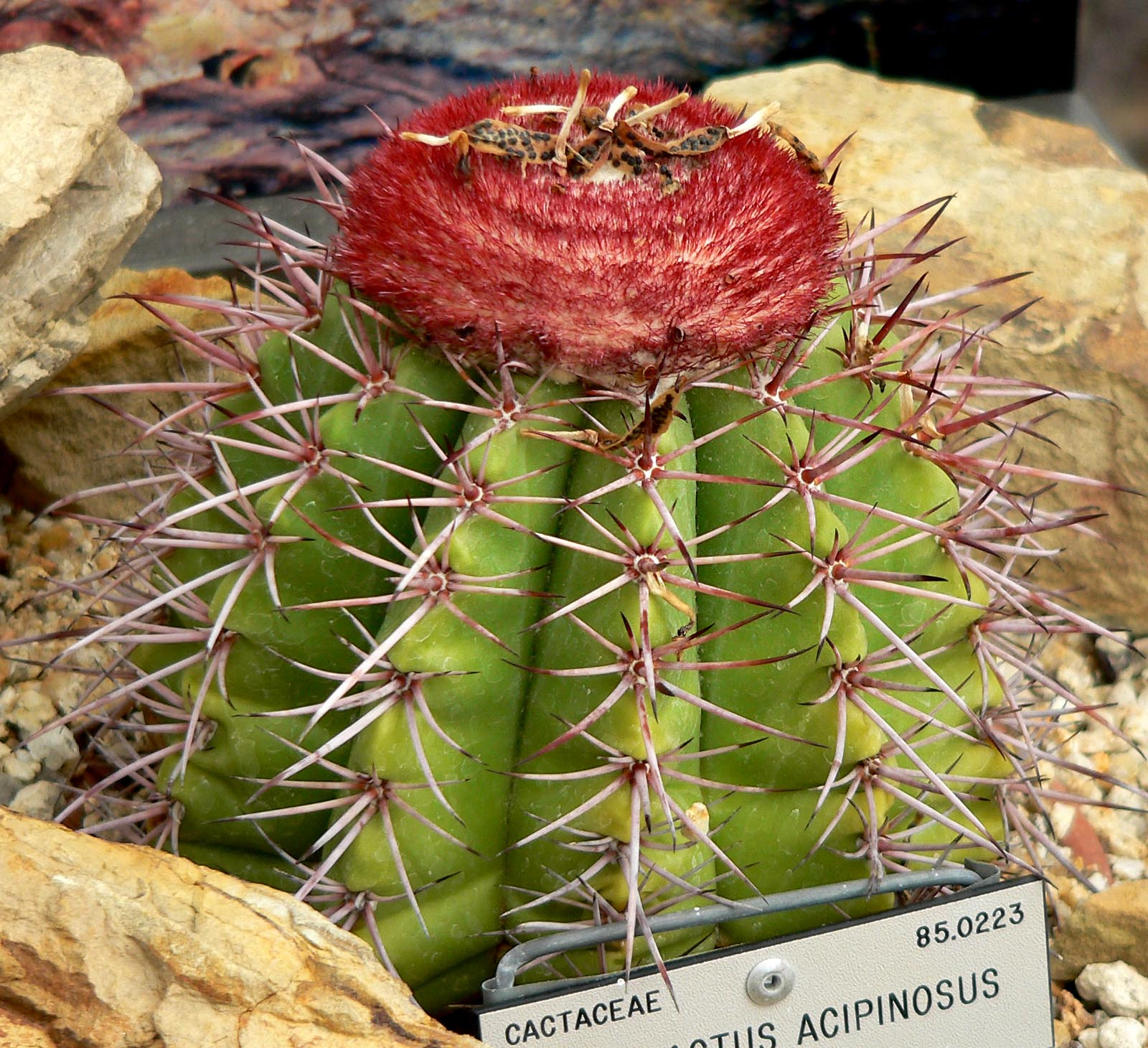
Example of a Melocactus (Turk's cap), which gives the islands half their name and appears in the coat of arms

The flag of the Turks and Caicos Islands features a Blue Ensign with the Union Flag in the canton, defaced with the coat of arms of the Turks and Caicos Islands in the centre-right. The coat of arms, which was granted on 28 September 1965, takes the shape of a yellow shield which contains a queen conch shell, lobster, and a Melocactus. The Melocactus, which is visually similar to the traditional Turkish fez, give the islands the first half of their name.

Whether the lobster on the coat of arms should have eight or ten legs has been disputed. It has been suggested that the original version of the flag showed ten legs, as would be accurate due to the decapod nature of lobsters, and that the first pair of smaller legs were hidden under the antennae and were subsequently missed in later drawings. It is thought that the lobster present on the coat of arms is a Caribbean spiny lobster (panulirus argus), which does indeed have ten legs.

The current flag was modified in 1999 when a white outline was added to the shield and the badge height was increased to approximately half of the hoist width.

== Related flags ==
=== Civil ensign ===
A Red Ensign with the shield to the centre-right is used as civil ensign (seen below), although this has not yet been approved by Order in Council laid before Parliament.

=== Gubernatorial flag ===
The Governor of the Turks and Caicos Islands has a separate flag (also seen below), a Union flag defaced with the coat of arms surrounded by a garland tied together with a blue ribbon. This design is similar to flags of the other Governors in British overseas territories. The current governor, since July 2019 is Nigel Dakin.

=== Historical flags ===
Former flag of the Turks and Caicos Islands before 1968

The previous flag used up to 1968 was also a defaced Blue Ensign. This flag had been in use since 1875 and had a different coat of arms to the current flag. The former coat of arms (which can be seen on the former flag below) featured a ship offshore from a beach with the name of the islands in a circle. It also showed a man working on the beach between two piles of salt, representing the salt industry which once dominated the economy of the Turks and Caicos Islands. The 1889 Admiralty Flag Book introduced some shading into the left-hand salt pile and what appears to be a door into the right-hand salt pile. This led to confusion of what the salt piles really were, with an igloo even being suggested.

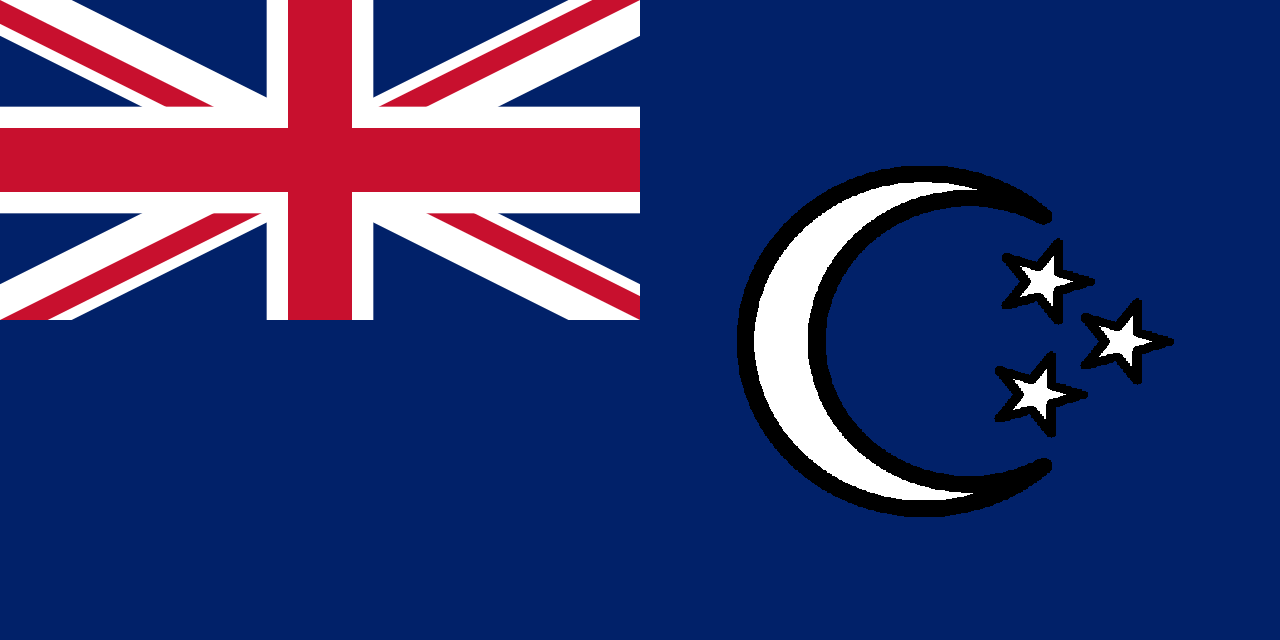
Melfort Campbell's proposed 1870 flag

The corresponding gubernatorial flag was a Union flag defaced by the former coat of arms in the centre.

In 1870, an alternative to this had been proposed, which retained the Union Flag but which was defaced with a white crescent and three stars against a blue background. The crescent would be emblematic of the name of the islands (Turks, referring to the flag of what was then the Safavid Empire or Ottoman Empire) and the three stars would refer to Grand Turk, Salt Cay and the Caicos Group. This alternative was proposed by Melfort Campbell, who was the Council President of the islands from 1869 to 1872, as a simplification, due to the difficulty and expense of emblazoning the coat of arms of the Turks and Caicos Islands onto a Union Flag. This flag, however, was rejected because it did not comply with the Order in Council of 7 August 1869, which required the coat of arms of the territory to be present on the flag.

== List of flags ==
=== Territory flag ===
Flag	Date	Use	Description
	1889-1968	Flag of the Turks and Caicos Islands	A British Blue Ensign with the Union Flag in the canton and the Island's badge in the fly
	1968-1999	Flag of the Turks and Caicos Islands	A British Blue Ensign with the Union Flag in the canton and the Island's coat of arms in the fly
	1999-present	Flag of the Turks and Caicos Islands	A British Blue Ensign with the Union Flag in the canton and the coat of arms with a white outline in the fly

=== Governor's Flag ===
Flag	Date	Use	Description
	1889-1968	Flag of the Commissioner and the Administrator	A Union Flag defaced with the Island's badge
	1968-present	Flag of the Governor	A Union Flag defaced with the Island's coat of arms

=== Ensigns ===
Flag	Date	Use	Description
	1968-1999	Civil Ensign	A British Red Ensign with the Union Flag in the canton and the Island's coat of arms in the fly
	1999-present	Civil Ensign	A British Red Ensign with the Union Flag in the canton and the Island's coat of arms with a white outline in the fly
