= Coat of arms of the Turks and Caicos Islands =

Coat of arms

Versions
- Lesser variant
- Armiger: Turks and Caicos Islands
- Adopted: 28 September 1965
- Crest: On a Wreath Or and Azure, On a Mount Vert a Pelican between two Sisal Plants proper
- Shield: Or in chief a Queen Conch Shell and a Spiny Lobster and in base a Turk's Head Cactus proper

The coat of arms of the Turks and Caicos Islands consists of a gold-coloured escutcheon (shield) charged with a conch shell, lobster and a cactus, supported by two flamingos, and topped with a pelican in the crest. Adopted three years after the islands became a Crown colony, it has been the coat of arms of the Turks and Caicos Islands since 1965. The escutcheon is featured on the flag of the territory. The previous badge featured two mounds of salt in front of a ship, with doors added to the mounds after they were reportedly mistaken for igloos.

== History ==
Badge used from the 1870s until 1965

The Turks and Caicos Islands were ruled by the British colonial government in the Bahama Islands starting in 1799. Tensions between the two territories, coupled with financial troubles, led to the Turks and Caicos being given their own charter in 1848, before being placed under the administration of the Colony of Jamaica 26 years later. During the 1870s, the territory was accorded its own badge to be utilised on its flag. This consisted of two mounds of salt on land in the foreground, awaiting to be loaded onto a ship in the background. A door was erroneously added to one of the mounds, however, when the designer or an official at the Admiralty reportedly mistook the salt mounds for igloos. This was not rectified up until a new coat of arms was instituted in the 1960s.

The Turks and Caicos Islands became a Crown colony in 1962, after Jamaica became independent that same year. The islands were consequently reunited with the Bahamas from 1962 until 1973, when the latter territory became independent and the Turks and Caicos were granted their own governor. A new coat of arms for the territory was adopted by royal warrant on 28 September 1965.

== Design ==
The coat of arms of the Turks and Caicos Islands are blazoned as follows:

Or in chief a Queen Conch Shell and a Spiny Lobster and in base a Turk's Head Cactus proper; and for the Crest: On a Wreath Or and Azure, On a Mount Vert a Pelican between two Sisal Plants proper; and for Supporters: On either side a Flamingo proper.

=== Symbolism ===
The colours and objects on the coat of arms carry cultural, political, and regional meanings. The queen conch shell and spiny lobster allude to the islands' primary industry of fishing. The Turk's Head cactus symbolises the territory's biome. Taken altogether, the shell, lobster, and cactus represent the flora and fauna of the islands. The crest at the top depicts a white pelican flanked by two sisal plants – evoking the islands' past trade of rope-making – while the supporters grasping the shield on both sides are flamingos.

=== Uses ===
The shield from the arms features on the flag of the Turks and Caicos Islands, and on the standard of the territory's governor.

== See also ==
- List of coats of arms of the United Kingdom and dependencies
- Caribbean heraldry
