= Districts of the Turks and Caicos Islands =

The Turks and Caicos Islands are divided into five administrative districts (one in the Turks Islands and four in the Caicos Islands), and the Island of Grand Turk; four of these are headed by District Commissioners, and Providenciales District is run by the Permanent Secretary of the Office of the Premier in Providenciales. The Island of Grand Turk is directly administered by the TCI Government.

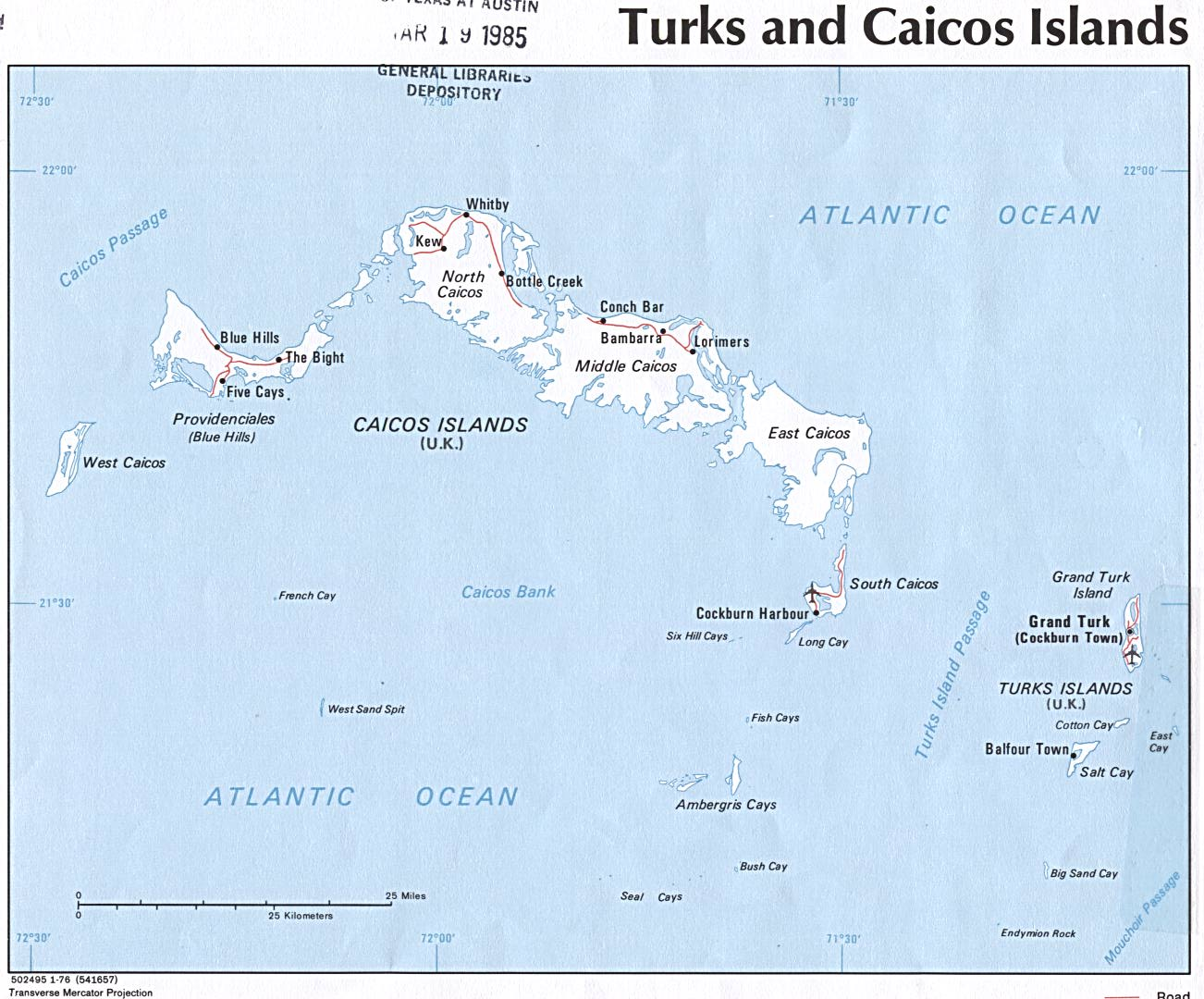
Map of the Turks and Caicos Islands.

Nr	Administrative District	Headquarters	Area km²	Population 2012-12-01 (Note: Census of 2012-12-01)	Electoral Districts
Caicos Islands
1	Providenciales (including West Caicos)	Blue Hills	163.6	33,293	6
2	North Caicos	Bottle Creek	144.9	2,156	2
3	Middle Caicos	Conch Bar	144.2	522	1
4	South Caicos (including East Caicos)	Cockburn Harbour	136.8	2,063	2
Turks Islands
5	Grand Turk	Cockburn Town	17.6	4,831	4
6	Salt Cay	Balfour Town	9.1	108	-
	Turks and Caicos Islands	Cockburn Town	616.2	42,973	15

(the area figures were determined from information in "TCI Physical Characteristics")

== Electoral Districts ==
Electoral Districts from the 2025 election onwards

For the November 2012 elections the Electoral District Boundary Commission has delineated 10 Electoral districts:

1. Grand Turk North - former West Road and Overback
2. Grand Turk South - former North and South Back Salina, and Salt Cay
3. South Caicos, East Caicos, Little and Big Ambergris Cays
4. Middle and North Caicos, and Parrot Cay
5. Leeward, Providenciales, Pine Cay, Little and Big Water Cays, and East Cays, including Dellis Cay
6. The Bight, Providenciales
7. Cheshire Hall and Richmond Hill, Providenciales
8. Blue Hills, Providenciales
9. Five Cays, Providenciales
10. Wheeland and North West and North Central, Providenciales, and West Caicos.

On August 14, 2012, Governor Roderic Todd signed into law the Electoral Districts (Boundaries Amendment) Ordinance.

=== 2016 election results by constituency ===
By the time of the 2016 House of Assembly elections, there were 10 electoral districts ("constituencies") and the results were as follows:

Constituency		Candidate	Party	Votes
1	Grand Turk North	George Lightbourne	PNP	305
1	Grand Turk North	Derek Rolle	PDM	273
1	Grand Turk North	Kwame Odinga Smith	PDA	21
2	Grand Turk South and Saltcay	Edwin Astwood	PDM	399
2	Grand Turk South and Saltcay	Arthur Lightbourne	PNP	276
2	Grand Turk South and Saltcay	Noel Terrence Skippings	PDA	66
2	Grand Turk South and Saltcay	Valerie Jennings	Independent	12
3	South Caicos	Ruth Blackman	PNP	146
3	South Caicos	McAllister Eusene Hanchell	Independent	97
3	South Caicos	Keno Shamado Forbes	PDM	70
3	South Caicos	Christopher Emanuel Hall	PDA	6
4	Middle and North Caicos	Ralph Higgs	PDM	262
4	Middle and North Caicos	Mark Fulford	PNP	201
5	Leeward (Providenciales)	Akierra Missick	PNP	376
5	Leeward (Providenciales)	Ezra Ringo Tyrone Taylor	PDM	289
5	Leeward (Providenciales)	Calsada Carolie Johnson	PDA	17
6	The Bight (Providenciales)	Porsha Stubbs-Smith	PNP	285
6	The Bight (Providenciales)	George C.D. Pratt	PDM	284
6	The Bight (Providenciales)	Dozzlie McLom Delancy	PDA	38
7	Cheshire Hall and Richmond Hill (Providenciales)	Douglas Parnell	PDM	451
7	Cheshire Hall and Richmond Hill (Providenciales)	Amanda Misick	PNP	347
7	Cheshire Hall and Richmond Hill (Providenciales)	Charles Delancy	PDA	43
8	Blue Hills (Providenciales)	Mixmillian Goldray Ewing	PDM	366
8	Blue Hills (Providenciales)	Claudine Ewing-Pratt	PNP	267
8	Blue Hills (Providenciales)	Ciclyn Been	PDA	37
9	Five Cays (Providenciales)	Sean Rickard Astwood	PDM	470
9	Five Cays (Providenciales)	Rachel Marshall Taylor	PNP	269
9	Five Cays (Providenciales)	Bobbie Chambers	PDA	15
10	Wheeland (Providenciales)	Vaden Delroy Williams	PDM	305
10	Wheeland (Providenciales)	Dameko Canez Dean	PNP	173
10	Wheeland (Providenciales)	Hudson James Parker	Independent	23
All Island District; 5 elected at-large
All Island District; 5 elected at-large		Sharlene Cartwright-Robinson	PDM	3,024
All Island District; 5 elected at-large		Josephine Connolly	PDM	3,019
All Island District; 5 elected at-large		Derek Hugh Taylor	PDM	2,740
All Island District; 5 elected at-large		Karen Evadne Malcolm	PDM	2,725
All Island District; 5 elected at-large		Washington Misick	PNP	2,335
All Island District; 5 elected at-large		Robert A. Been	PDM	2314
All Island District; 5 elected at-large		Rufus Ewing	PNP	2234
All Island District; 5 elected at-large		John Malcolm	PNP	2011
All Island District; 5 elected at-large		Ricardo Don-Hue Gardner	PNP	1901
All Island District; 5 elected at-large		Sheba Latrice Wilson	PNP	1861
All Island District; 5 elected at-large		Michael Misick	Independent	1629
All Island District; 5 elected at-large		Jasmin Walkin	Independent	834
All Island District; 5 elected at-large		Sabrina Elizebeth Green	Independent	675
All Island District; 5 elected at-large		Oswald Skippings	PDA	549
All Island District; 5 elected at-large		Clarence Wesley Selver	Independent	301
All Island District; 5 elected at-large		Samuel Iotis Harvey	PDA	255
All Island District; 5 elected at-large		Courtney Missick	Independent	240
All Island District; 5 elected at-large		Damian Wilson	Independent	206
All Island District; 5 elected at-large		Shirley Louise Clarke-Calcano	PDA	178
All Island District; 5 elected at-large		Herbert Andrew Swann jr.	PDA	135
All Island District; 5 elected at-large		Oscar O’Brien Forbes	Independent	67
Source: RTC

== See also ==
- ISO 3166-2 Subdivision codes for the Turks and Caicos Islands
