= Telecommunications in the Turks and Caicos Islands =

Communications in the Turks and Caicos Islands

== Telephone ==
Telephones - main lines in use: 4,000 (2021)

Telephones - mobile cellular: 25,085 (2004)

Telephone system: fair cable and radiotelephone services

domestic: NA
international: 1 submarine cable (Arcos-1); satellite earth station - 1 Intelsat (Atlantic Ocean)

== Radio ==
Radio broadcast stations: AM 3 (one inactive), FM 6, shortwave 0 (1998) A partial list of AM/FM/SW stations in the Turks and Caicos Islands is provided below:

AM Radio:

- 530 Radio Visión Cristiana
- VHT 1460 (formerly VSI)

FM Radio:

- ZISP-FM 88.1 Smooth FM
- ZGCI-FM 88.3 GCI Broadcasting
- ZIBT-FM 88.5 Connolly Productions Company
- ZIDG-FM 88.7 88 Jamz - D & D Ewing Communications Ltd. 88.7 / 98.9
- ZRTC-FM 89.1 Radio Turks and Caicos (Cockburn Town; formerly 107.7 until June 2018)
  - ZRTC-1 89.1 Radio Turks and Caicos (Cockburn Town; formerly 101.9 until June 2018)
  - ZRTC-2 89.1 Radio Turks and Caicos (Providenciales; formerly 103.9 until June 2018)
- ZWIV-1 89.3 Coral Radio 1 (WIV)
- ZHPE 89.7 Hope Radio
- ZWIV-2 89.9 Coral Radio 2 (WIV)
- ZIPH-FM 90.5 90.5 Praise Him FM
- ZISN-FM 91.1 91.1 Sun FM Sun Media
- ZIPW-FM 92.5 92.5 Power FM
- ZIIS-FM 93.9 93.9 Island FM
- ZIKB-FM 94.7 KIST 95
  - ZIKC-FM 95.1 KIST 95
- ZVIC-FM 96.7 VIC - Victory in Christ Radio
- ZIHP-FM 96.9 House on the Rock Ministries
- ZIAP-FM 98.3 Abundant Life Ministries
- ZIDP-FM 98.9 ROJ - Rock of Jesus
- ZIKS-FM 99.9 Kiss FM
- ZIWV-3 102.5 WIV Radio
- ZITR-FM 104.5 Tradewinds Radio TCI
- ZIBF-FM 105.5 / 103.5 ZIBF, Life Radio
- ZRTP-FM 105.9 RTC 105.9
- ZIKP-FM 106.3 KIST 106.3

Shortwave:

- VSI-8 4780 kHz
- VSI-35 8000 kHz

Defunct:

- 1020 Caribbean Christian Radio (1995-1998) (call-sign unknown at this time)
- 1020 SuperPower 1020 (call-sign unknown at this time)
- 1570 Atlantic Beacon (call-sign unknown at this time)
- Hope Radio 89.7 (call-sign unknown at this time)
- VHTC-FM 91.5
- TCI Baptist Union 94.7 (call-sign unknown at this time)
- VHT-FM 101.9 (formerly VSI-FM)
- ZIBS-FM 107.1

Radios: 8,000 (1997)

== Television ==
Television broadcast stations: 2

WIV Cable has been operating on the islands for over 10 years (Channel 4)

New to Turks & Caicos, TCeyeTV started broadcasting on 3 July 2007

broadcasts from The Bahamas are also received; cable television is established) (1997)

== Internet ==
Internet Service Providers (ISPs): 3 (2013)

- LIME (ADSL)
- WIV (DSL)
- Islandcom (4G)

Country code (Top level domain): TC
