= New Zealand Cadet Forces =

- Te Taua Tauira ō Aotearoa (Māori)
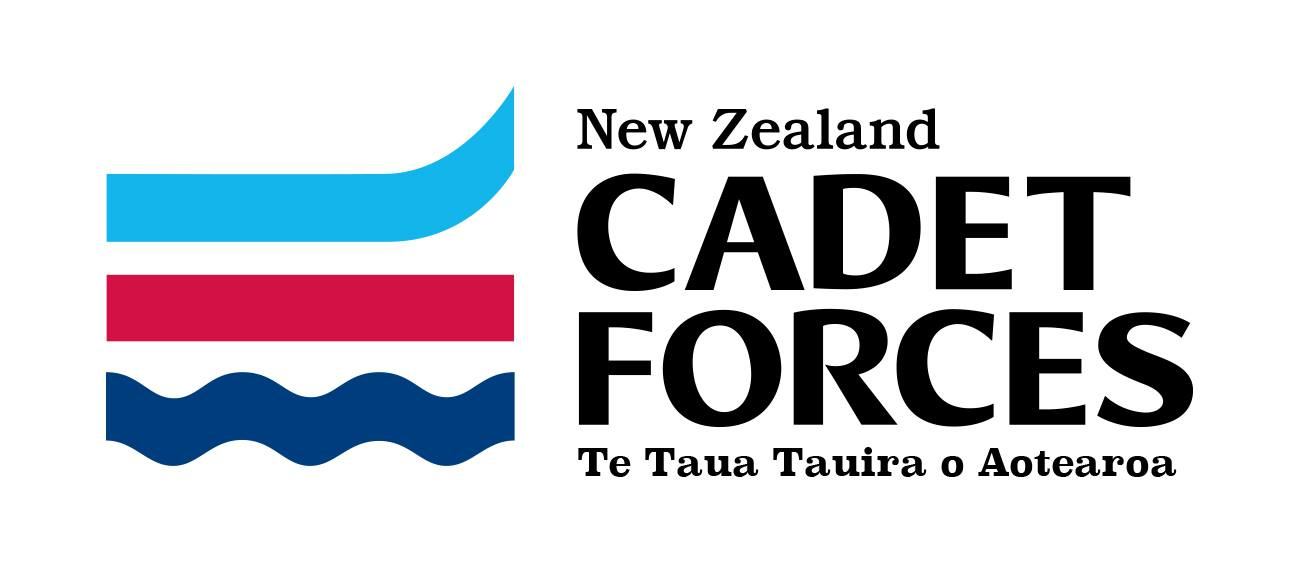
- The NZCF Logo
- Active: 1864 – present
- Country: New Zealand
- Allegiance: HM The King
- Branch: Sea Cadet Corps; New Zealand Cadet Corps; Air Training Corps
- Type: Volunteer Youth Organisation
- Size: 99 Cadet Units: 49 ATC Squadrons; 34 NZCC Units; 16 SCC Training Ships; ~3,160 Cadets; ~735 Commissioned Officers' and Support Staff
- HQNZCF: Trentham Military Camp
- Motto: Preparing New Zealand’s successful leaders of tomorrow
- Anniversaries: 12 November
- Website: www.cadetforces.org.nz

Commanders
- Minister of Defence: Hon Paul Goldsmith
- Chief of Defence Force: Acting Vice Admiral Mat Williams
- Commandant NZCF: Wing Commander Bruce Creedy, RNZAF
- Executive Officer NZCF: Squadron Leader Bruce Sinclair, RNZAF
- Assistant Commandant: Wing Commander Shane Cole, NZBM QSM NZCF
- Warrant Officer Cadet Forces (WOCF): Vacant
- Warrant Officer Central Area (WOCA): Cadet Warrant Officer Tatjana Hanne
- Warrant Officer Northern Area (WONA): Cadet Warrant Officer Sophie Bingley
- Warrant Officer Southern Area (WOSA): Vacant

Insignia
- Navy Cadets Logo

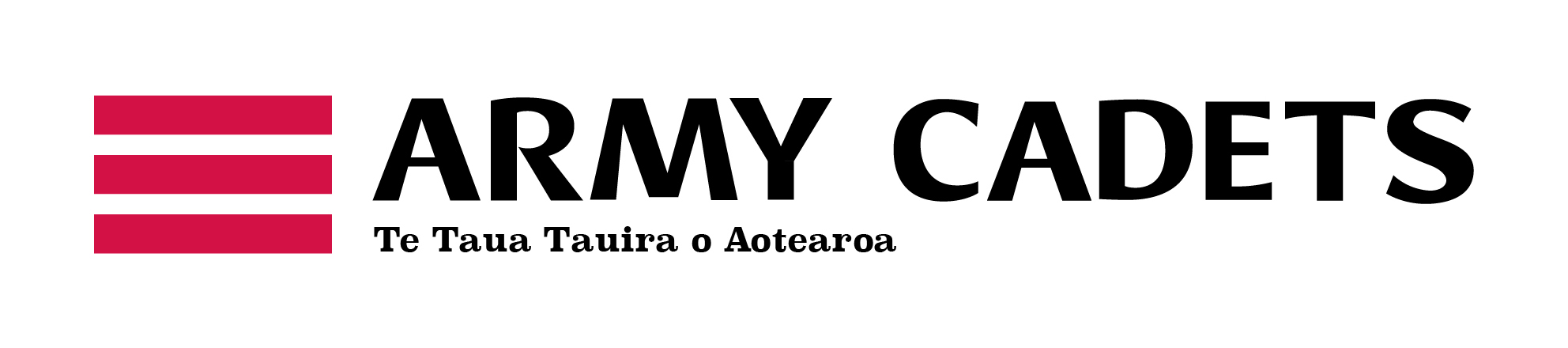
- Army Cadets Logo

- Air Cadets Logo

The New Zealand Cadet Forces (Cadet Forces or NZCF) is a voluntary military-style training organisation for New Zealand youth between the ages of 13 and 21. Run in partnership with the New Zealand Defence Force (NZDF) and local community organisations. Through its three branches, the New Zealand Cadet Forces provide young adults with a four-year training curriculum, while a number of local, area, and national camps and courses provide further experience and qualifications. It is jointly funded by the Ministry of Defence, the Royal New Zealand Returned Services' Association, local communities, and the Associated charities belonging to each branch (CCANZ, SCANZ, ATCANZ). Overall it is directed by Acting Vice Admiral Mat Williams, Chief of Defence Force. Cadets are not under any obligation to join the New Zealand Defence Force, however many choose to do so upon turning 18 years old.

== Organisation ==
It is composed of three Branches or Corps (similar to the New Zealand Defence Force):

- New Zealand Cadet Corps (NZCC)
- Sea Cadet Corps (SCC)
- Air Training Corps (ATC).

The New Zealand Cadet Forces is commanded by the Commandant New Zealand Cadet Forces (COMDT NZCF). Assisting the Commandant is the Executive Officer NZCF (XO NZCF), the Assistant Commandant (ASST COMDT NZDF), and the Warrant Officer New Zealand Cadet Forces (WONZCF).

Training is provided by Cadet Force Officers, Cadet Non-Commissioned Officers, and adult volunteers through Cadet Units nationwide. Supported by three Cadet Forces Training and Support Units (CFTSU) composed of NZDF Regular Force (RF) personnel. The New Zealand Cadet Forces also play a large role in supporting community projects through volunteer labour.

== History ==
=== 1864–1902 ===
The first unit raised was at Otago Boys' High School in 1864, making it the oldest youth service organisations in New Zealand. By 1870 there were several secondary school units in existence, among the first being Nelson College, Christ's College, Wellington College and Auckland Grammar School.

From 1864 until 1902 the training followed that used in the British public schools. The emphasis was on rigid discipline and shooting marksmanship and it was entirely controlled by the Headmaster; the Army was not involved. The Education Act 1902 (New Zealand) was responsible for most secondary schools forming cadet units and the Army became directly involved in the Cadets training following their Boer War participation.

=== 1903–1940 ===
In 1911, Lord Kitchener stated, during his visit to New Zealand, that the Cadet movement had an important role to play in the Defence of the Empire. Subsequently, the Army began to provide uniforms, rifles and other equipment to the units. This Army support continued through World War I, with many school cadets making up the officers and non-commissioned officers of the First Expeditionary Force.

In 1919 Compulsory Military Training was for all males from 14 – 21 years, thus Cadet units were structured into Cadet Battalions. Territorial regiments were raised and on completion of Secondary school schoolboys were posted to these Regiments.

In 1932 CMT was abolished, but most Cadet Units continued at the schools on a voluntary basis, supported by teachers who had experienced World War I. During World War II the Army could not support the cadet movement but Officers ineligible for war service continued to manage the organisation.

In 1929 the first open Sea Cadet Corps was formed in Christchurch, by the Canterbury Navy League. Units formed in the four main centres and were controlled nationally by the Canterbury branch of the League. The Navy League continued to manage these open community Sea Cadet units even when they came under the control of the Royal New Zealand Navy.

=== 1941–1970 ===
The Air Training Corps was formed in September 1941, Its purpose was to train potential airmen, providing basic knowledge and training as well as to provide an insight into Air Force work to prepare young men for the Air Force when they were old enough.

In the 1950s specialist training appropriate to their parent service was introduced for the cadet forces. The rate of increase in the cadet movement from 1948 – 1960 eventually proved counter productive in the 1960s as the Army could not effectively support the numbers while meeting their own commitments.

By 1964 the NZCF reached peak strength, mainly in school units of 198 units, with 1,000 officers and about 54,000 cadets.

Reorganisation saw many schools cease cadet support and by 1965 there were about 20,000 cadets; further changes to support by the Army and the communities reduced school cadet numbers to 34 units and 10,300 cadets by 1970. Open community Sea Cadet Corps and Air Training Corps units had, meanwhile, slowly decreased to 55 units with 3,200 cadets.

=== 1971–1984 ===
Centralised supervision was established by the Chief of Defence Force of all three Corps and a Commandant appointed with Regular Force Defence personnel, under the control of the Commandant, provided at five locations around New Zealand to support units. Cadet Force officers were appointed by the Minister of Defence with Cadet Force commissions, on a voluntary unpaid basis with authority to wear military uniform and rank.

The 1971 Defence Act, established the NZCF, as a volunteer organisation, for which the Minister of Defence was responsible. The open units were required to be initiated and funded by the community and the Chief of Defence Force was authorised to "direct and supervise" the NZCF and provide military support which was initially confirmed as uniforms, training and some equipment at a cost of no greater than $400,000.

The role of the NZCF ceased being primarily of military training and the preparation of young men for the Armed Forces and became predominantly adventure and development motivated with a military flavour and about 50% military subjects associated with providing knowledge of the roles and functions of the NZDF. The new thrust was to provide "good citizenship skills" to young men under the training methods used by the Military Forces.

Female cadets were accepted from 1977 and although the service flavour and well tried and tested services training methods and character was retained, additional training was introduced by units, which were desired by them and the community supporters.

=== 1985–1990 ===
The loss of Government financial support and turbulent social change in the 1970s caused school units to be abandoned such that by 1985 there were only nine remaining units, including the two earliest formed at Christ's and Nelson Colleges. Meanwhile, the Sea Cadet Corps had increased to 17 units and the ATC to 50 in the open community units. A significant development saw the introduction of Cadet Corps Units into the open community to satisfy the demand which the schools had abandoned, the first open Cadet Unit being the City of Porirua unit in October 1985.

=== 1991–2010 ===
In 1991 the ATC celebrated its Golden Jubilee, 50 years since it was formed. To celebrate and raise its public profile a relay run was organised in which cadets from every unit in NZ participated. It started at either end of the country and converged in Wellington. Along the way money was collected and donated to CANTEEN-teenagers with cancer.

In 2001 the ATC celebrated its Diamond Jubilee of 60 years in operation with special parades held in each area. By this time the ATC comprised 52 Squadrons spread from Kaitaia to Invercargill and approximately 2500 cadets.

At the beginning of 2010, there were 103 Cadet Force units in New Zealand, and cadet numbers approximately 4500 with 360 cadet officers.

=== 2010–2019 ===
Cadet 150

In 2014 the NZ Cadet Forces celebrated 150 years as one of New Zealand's oldest youth organisations. This saw most of their personnel hold the largest cadet exercise in 50 years, 'Cadet 150'. Held at Waiouru Army Camp, the exercise ran from January 24-30th and had cadets from every unit attending. In total around 1200 Personnel attended the event, with approximately 120 personnel being invited from allied cadet forces around the world, including:

- Six cadets and one officer from the Canadian Cadet Organisation
- 70 cadets and officers from the Australian Defence Cadets. These personnel were transported to New Zealand via RAAF C-130J aircraft.

Upon arrival all cadets were separated into 25 different teams sorted Alpha – Yankee. These Platoons represented the group cadets would belong to for the week long activity and dictated when cadets would be eating and their accommodation and was relevant to the elective that the attending cadet had chosen.

Before arriving, personnel were able to nominate an elective to participate in, which determined a set of activities they participated in:

Land Elective

The Land Elective was a day tramp over the Tongariro Crossing in the Tongariro National Park volcanic plateau.

Water Elective

The Water Elective included sailing, kayaking, life raft experience and abseiling off a dam. Conducted at Lake Moawhango.

Air Elective

The Air Elective included an air experience flight, a flight simulator, military aircraft static displays, as well as RNZAF unit presentations. Conducted at RNZAF Base Ohakea. Cadets were transported via contracted bus services to RNZAF Base Ohakea early in the morning.

General Training Programme

As well as their chosen elective, attending personnel also participated in the following activities:

Cadet 150 Activities
- MILFAM – Military weapons and vehicles familiarisation
- CIVFAM – Civilian weapons and historical Cadet weapons familiarisation
- STEYR – Steyr shoot
- WETS – Weapons Effects Training Simulator
- .22 SHOOT – Live Marlin XT .22 shoot
- CONCOURSE – Confidence course and mud run
- ORIENTEERING – Orienteering and Rogain course
- HIGH ROPES – High ropes course and pool
- MUSEUM – Visit to Waiouru Army Museum with Cadet flavoured exhibition
- SPORTS – Combined field/outdoor sports
- CASEVAC – Casualty evacuation and triage activity
- ARCHERY / MOUNTAIN BIKE – Archery and mountain biking

2014 - Operation Tauira

The year 2014 saw the implementation of Operation Tauira, a four-year, complete overhaul of the NZCF to better align the organisation with legislation and volunteer organisation best practice, improving the linkages with the NZDF recruiting objectives and to better enable achievement of the NZCF mission. Operation Tauira also implemented deliberate future-proofing initiatives to reduce risk, particularly in health and safety, reputation and relationship management. Along with the changes the NZCF saw a complete the restructure of the Headquarters element. The new structure saw the NZCF adopt the NATO style continental staff system, with NZCF commissioned officers now taking a bigger role in running the organisation at the national and area levels. This change saw the appointment of the first ever senior NZCF officer at the rank of a Wing Commander who has control over the day to day Cadet Force volunteers, and their operational running of the organisation in consultation with the Commandant NZCF.

2017 - Battle of Passchendaele, Youth Ambassadors

On 11 August 2016 the Ministry for Veteran's Affairs announced the "2016 Battle of Passchendaele Multi-Media Competition". Two personnel from the NZCF were selected from the general competition (Available to all year 13 students in New Zealand) to take part in the Youth Ambassadors delegation to travel to Belgium. The NZCF also sent along official representatives.

2018 - Visual Identity System

In August 2018, the New Zealand Cadet Forces introduce a new Visual Identity System. Under this new system the NZCF allowed the use of Navy Cadets, Army Cadets, and Air Cadets for the members of the Sea Cadet Corps, the New Zealand Cadet Corps, and the Air Training Corps respectively. The system also introduced a new logo for each corps and a primary logo for the NZCF. The primary logo is an amalgamation of the three separate corps logos. "The new NZCF logo is an opportunity to refresh and modernise the NZCF brand. It is a clean and modern visual representation of the three component organisations which comprise the NZCF." The badges of the three cadet forces remain official emblems. These badges have Royal Assent and are protected by the Flags, Emblems and Names Protection Act 1981.

Badges and Logos of the New Zealand Cadet Forces
Name	Official Badge	Current Logo	Former Logo
New Zealand Cadet Forces	Nil		
Sea Cadet Corps		Navy Cadets Logo	Nil
New Zealand Cadet Corps		Army Cadets Logo	Nil
Air Training Corps		Air Cadets Logo	Nil

2018 - CadetNet

CadetNet is an online website based intranet developed in house by New Zealand Cadet Forces personnel that is designed to optimise processes and act as a singular source for information and material related to the New Zealand Cadet Forces. The system is operated by, and only accessible by active members of the organisation.

Early Release

The concept for a Cadet Forces online hub began in 2014 with several years’ work being undertaken by a small group of NZCF Officers. In 2018 an early version of an integrated online hub for all cadet needs was released named "CadetNet ". Developed by the S6 – Communications and Information Systems branch of Headquarters, and managed by project leader SQNLDR S. Hobbs, NZCF. This early role out to officers and a limited number of units included basic functionality such as a repository of manuals and information relevant to the routine operation and training of NZCF personnel. Over the course of the year more systems were rolled out unit by unit, such as a tab based system for different branches of the organisation. In practice this meant if a person within the organisation wanted to find out about uniform, they could go the "S4 – Logistics" tab and find the manual relevant to the uniform they wanted to know about.

The other half of CadetNet included digital profiles for all personnel. Meaning all members of the New Zealand Cadet Forces could be uniquely recorded in a single database for the first time in the organisations history. These profiles allow personnel to update their personal details such as changes in address and contact details. With a comprehensive privacy policy ensuring the data of each individual can not be accessed without appropriate permissions.

The profiles also allow cadets the ability to see a history of their promotions, awards they have received, courses and camps they have completed, creating a "Cadet CV". While this does not make the NZCF record of service books that all cadets are issued redundant, this enables cadets to track their record of achievements using a more convenient medium.

In mid 2018 a new version was released that included automatic compiling of the NZCF 20 form. The NZCF 20 form is a monthly report detailing the number of each rank that paraded with that unit, any activities and events that the unit undertook, and a forecast of events happening in the upcoming month. This CadetNet update reduced the role the adjutant plays to double checking the results are correct and signing off on them.

Full release

In late 2018 and early 2019 the first organisation wide release occurred with all personnel of all rank being required to supply (in addition to what is required upon enrolment) an email and two separate next of kin who must have basic contact details (Contact number, email, address).

At this point more functions had been introduced with the goal of streamlining and reducing workload on officers. In addition to the digitization of the NZCF 20 form, Cadets were able to directly apply for courses and eventually unit activities directly through the CadetNet portal. Previously if personnel wanted to attend a course they would have to rely on NZCF staff promulgating the Annual Training Programme issued from Headquarters, request and complete the NZCF Form 8, supply it to their unit's adjutant, then the adjutant would have to collate all applications and email the successful applications (subject to Cadet Unit Commander's approval) to Headquarters. With CadetNet this shortened to a cadet being able to see all upcoming courses they are eligible for and applying directly to them, this means from a staff point of view all that is necessary is to select the applicants and forward them to headquarters.

2019 - RNZAF Base Auckland - New Youth Facility

On 29 June 2019 the New Zealand Defence Force opened a new youth development facility on the grounds of RNZAF Base Auckland. The new facility, which has accommodation for up to 120 personnel will give the NZCF another facility to utilise for promotional NCO courses (SNCO and JNCO course primarily) and shooting courses, which will see the NZCF use the nearby 25m range.

The first use of the facility by the NZCF was a Senior Non-Commissioned Officer Course, which ran from 15 to 21 July 2020. Since this the facility has been used for numerous courses and competitions. The primary benefit for the facility is the location, with most Northern Area units being based in or around Auckland, there are fewer logistical challenges than transporting personnel to Whangaparāoa (Tamaki Leadership Centre).

=== 2020–2021 ===
After the success of the Cadet 150 exercise the organisation wanted to capitalise on the planning and experience gained. This came to fruition from 19 to 26 January 2020, the New Zealand Cadet Forces held exercise Cadet 2020. While originally the exercise was scheduled to be held at Tekapo Military Camp, due to logistical challenges the location was changed to Waiouru Army Camp. The exercise saw approximately 1000 cadets and 250 officers from the New Zealand Cadet Forces attend as well as personnel from the New Zealand Defence in support, providing the venue and logistical support for the exercise.

Using the experience from the Cadet 150 Exercise, the activity was expanded to accommodate more activities and experiences, but unlike Cadet 150, was not opened to the cadet forces of other nations.

The exercise was fortunate in its timing, as the first case of COVID-19 was reported in New Zealand less than a month after the exercise. This was closely followed by an announcement from the NZCF Headquarters of "an operational pause to all NZCF activities".

Similar to the Cadet 150 exercise, before cadets arrived they were given the option of 4 electives to choose from;

- Air Elective, Land Elective, Adventure Elective and Maritime Elective. Furthermore, for four days of the activity cadets were grouped into formations for a 'round robin' training programme where they were able to experience;

Cadet 2020 Activities
- MILFAM – Military weapons and vehicles familiarisation
- CIVFAM – Civilian weapons and historical Cadet weapons familiarisation
- DRONE FLYING – Flying FPV Drones (which were later donated to the NZCF by the NZ Army)
- MARS-L SHOOT – Live fire MARS-L shoot
- WETS – Weapons Effects Training Simulator
- .22 SHOOT – Live Marlin XT .22 shoot
- CONCOURSE – Confidence course and mud run
- ABSEILING – Abseiling activity off of Lake Moawhango dam
- ORIENTEERING – Orienteering and Rogain course
- HIGH ROPES – High ropes course and pool
- MUSEUM – Visit to Waiouru Army Museum with Cadet flavoured exhibition
- SPORTS – Combined field/outdoor sports
- PAINTBALL – Team versus team paintball activity
- CASEVAC – Casualty evacuation and triage activity
- ARCHERY – Archery activity including blind folding marksmanship
- MOUNTAIN BIKE – Archery and mountain biking
- WHITE WATER RAFTING – Rubber tubing down rapids

2020 - COVID-19 Effects on the NZCF

Due to the effects of COVID-19 in New Zealand, Headquarters New Zealand Cadet Forces declared an "Operational Pause on ALL NZCF ACTIVITIES" at 11:59pm on 22 March 2020. To be reviewed on a weekly basis, while all of New Zealand remained at Alert Level 3 or above then all NZCF activities ceased. The cause for this "Operational Pause" was for two reasons;

1. To prevent the spread of COVID-19 within the organisation and comply with government restrictions on the size of gatherings.
2. To free up NZDF personnel in NZCF roles for recall to other positions for Operation PROTECT.

Due to the multiple COVID-19 resurgences in New Zealand there have been further operational pauses, forcing NZCF units to rapidly shift to online learning tools. Due to the continued closure of NZ borders all international exchanges have been indefinitely postponed.

== Composition ==
=== Headquarters ===
New Zealand Cadet Forces' headquarters element is based in Trentham Army Camp The commandant and New Zealand Defence Force Headquarters staff work out of this office. Each Area (Northern, Central, and Southern) also have their own offices which they use to administer their areas. Each area is normally led by a regular force commissioned officer, however occasionally senior non-commissioned officers hold the position. The Commandant of New Zealand Cadet Forces is typically a senior New Zealand Defence Force officer (LTCOL/E) and is drawn from any of the three NZDF branches.

Commandant of the New Zealand Cadet Forces History
No.	Commandant New Zealand Cadet Forces	Appointed	Years of Service	Reference
20	WGCDR B. Creedy	18 December 2023	Incumbent	
19	WGCDR M. Henderson, RNZAF	3 August 2021	2 years, 4 months	
18	CDR A.C. Law, RNZN	1 November 2019	1 Year, 5 Months	
17	LTCOL G.J. Morris, JP	5 March 2016	3 Years, 7 Months	
16	CDR G. Stokes, RNZN	19 March 2011	5 Years	
15	WGCDR G.W. Bendall, RNZAF	24 November 2007	3 Years, 3 Months	
14	LTCOL R.S. Campbell	12 July 2004	3 Years, 4 Months	
13	LTCOL J.L. Castell MNZM	17 July 2000	4 Years	
12	CDR J.E.R. Granville, RNZN	8 April 1996	4 Years, 3 Months	
11	WGCDR R.B. Smith, RNZAF	5 July 1993	2 Years, 8 Months	
10	WGCDR J.H. Seaward, RNZAF	1 December 1989	3 Years, 6 Months	
9	LTCOL J.W. Brown, MC	8 August 1988	1 Year, 3 Months	
8	LTCOL T.J. Turner	24 November 1986	1 Year, 7 Months	
7	LTCOL J.G.H Wilson	15 December 1982	3 Years, 9 Months	
6	LTCOL S.J.M. Winton	19 January 1980	2 Years, 9 Months	
5	WGCDR M.H. Bond, RNZAF	4 December 1978	1 Year, 1 Month	
4	WGCDR R.B. Parker, RNZAF	10 January 1977	1 Year, 9 Months	
3	WGCDR S.E. Gillingham, RNZAF	11 October 1976	2 Months	
2	LTCOL M.J. Hall, MC	27 July 1973	3 Years, 2 Months	
1	WGCDR J.C. Wood, DFC, RNZAF	1 April 1972	1 Year, 3 Months	

National and Area Warrant Officers

2017 saw the introduction of four new Warrant Officer positions for senior cadet NCOs. These positions are to allow a direct line of communication from cadets to the senior staff of the New Zealand Cadet Forces. The individual who holds the Warrant Officer New Zealand Cadet Forces position is a member of the Headquarters NZCF leadership team. They are mandated to render advice on any matters within the NZCF environment, but with particular focus on strategic matters affecting personnel, training, and welfare. The Warrant Officer of the New Zealand Cadet Forces reports directly to the Commandant, NZCF.

Area Warrant Officers operate in a similar, more regional capacity. These individuals are a supplementary member of the Cadet Force Training and Support Unit (CFTSU) of their relevant Area. Just like the National Warrant Officer these personnel are mandated to render advice on any matters within the NZCF environment, but with particular focus on matters affecting personnel and training and welfare in their areas. They work in partnership with the Area Coordinators and Area Support Officers in their region as well as corresponding with both the National Warrant Officer and holding regular conferences with the Unit Warrant Officers and Company Sergeant Majors in their regions to establish a consistent and effective strategy.

The four positions are as follows;

- Warrant Officer Cadet Forces
- Warrant Officer Northern Area
- Warrant Officer Central Area
- Warrant Officer Southern Area

The positions are intended for senior cadets who have held the position of Warrant Officer or Company Sergeant Major within a cadet unit of any corps. Air Training Corps and Sea Cadet Corps personnel are attributed the rank Cadet Warrant Officer, New Zealand Cadet Corps personnel are given the rank Cadet Warrant Officer Class 1.

In order for personnel to eligible for any of the four positions they must:

- Be a senior Warrant Officer or Warrant Officer Class II who has completed at least one year acting as a Cadet Unit Warrant Officer.
- Have the experience, ability and capacity to provide support and advice at strategic and operation levels;
- Have the ability to establish and maintain professional relationships at all levels.

Personnel selected for either an Area or National Warrant Officer position are appointed for a two-year period.

Warrant Officer of New Zealand Cadet Forces History
Warrant Officer New Zealand Cadet Forces	Appointed	Term of Service
WOCDT A. Waugh, SCC	13 March 2024	1 Year, 8 Months
CDTW/O J. Moore, ATC	22 March 2022	1 Year, 11 Months
CDTW/O S. Wells, ATC	1 July 2020	1 Year, 8 Months
CDTW/O F. Beaumont, ATC	21 April 2017	3 Years, 2 Months

Area Warrant Officers History
Northern Area Warrant Officer	Appointed	Term of Service	Central Area Warrant Officer	Appointed	Term of Service	Southern Area Warrant Officer	Appointed	Term of Service
			CDTW/O T. Hanne, ATC	15 April 2026	Incumbent			
CDTW/O S. Bingley, ATC	26 November 2024	Incumbent	CDT WO1 P. Adams, NZCC	15 April 2024	2 years	CDTW/O G. Bell, ATC	2 August 2024	Incumbent
CDTW/O J. McGowan, ATC	18 December 2022	2 Years	CDT WO1 T. Wells	7 May 2022	1 Year, 11 Months	CDTWO1 M. Costas	4 July 2022	2 Years
CDTWO1 S. Marwood, NZCC	28 February 2020	2 Year, 9 Months	CDTW/O J. Moore, ATC	9 December 2021	4 Months	CDTW/O J. Cotton, ATC	15 July 2020	1 Year, 11 Months
CDTW/O S. Crabbe, ATC	9 March 2018	1 Year, 11 Months	CDTWO1 C. Lawrence, NZCC	4 May 2021	7 Months	CDTWO1 E. Atkinson, NZCC	5 July 2018	2 Years
CDTWO T. Wong-Lithgow, SCC	21 April 2017	10 Months	CDTWO1 R. Coxill-Bogacki, NZCC	10 December 2018	2 Years, 4 Months	CDTWO1 H. Adams, NZCC	21 April 2017	1 Year, 2 Months
			CDTW/O A. Fergusson, ATC	12 May 2018	6 Months	CDTW/O G. Bell, ATC	5 August 2024	2 Years
			CDTW/O R. Dawson, ATC	21 April 2017	1 Year			

=== Branches ===
The Cadet Forces is made up of three branches or corps. Each corps is modelled on a corresponding branch of the NZDF: the Royal New Zealand Navy (RNZN), the New Zealand Army and the Royal New Zealand Air Force (RNZAF).

Each corps has its own training curriculum, uniforms and organisational structures aligned with its parent regular force branch.

==== New Zealand Cadet Corps ====
The New Zealand Cadet Corps (NZCC) is the land component of the NZCF and aligned with the New Zealand Army. Founded in 1864 the NZCC is the oldest branch of the New Zealand Cadet Forces. The NZCC represent the second smallest of the 3 cadet branches, and as of 2024 there are 34 units across New Zealand.

Cadet Corps training includes drill, first aid, land based navigation, land based search and rescue (SAR), survival skills, familiarisation with military tactics and equipment and dedicated firearms training. Each NZCC unit is sponsored by a unit in the New Zealand Army which give NZCC personnel unique opportunities to accompany and participate in army activities and become familiar with army equipment. Each area (Southern, Central, Northern) hold an annual Skills competition with all units being eligible to compete in, focusing on competitive application of core skills, with the winning team from each area later in the year competing at a national competition. A national course in fieldcraft is also offered.

==== Sea Cadet Corps ====
The Sea Cadet Corps (SCC) is the maritime arm of the NZCF, and is aligned with the RNZN. Founded in 1929 the SCC is the smallest of the three branches; as of 2021 the SCC has 17 training ships across New Zealand.

Sea Cadet Corps' training focus is marine based, with a large volume of spent sailing allowing personnel to develop their skills on the water including a swimming test in the beginning of service. To supplement core training, the SCC also provides its personnel with training in fieldcraft, firearms training, land and sea navigation, radio procedures, and other useful skills. Each area (Southern, Central, Northern) hold an annual regatta with all training ships, focusing on competitive application of core skills, with the winning team from each area later in the year competing at a national competition.

The two sailing boats that the SCC use are the Crown and the RS Feva. The Crown is a 4-person dinghy, specifically designed for the use of the units. The RS Fevas serves as a more modern vessel which could be raced in local, national and international regattas.

==== Air Training Corps ====
The Air Training Corps (ATC) is the aviation arm of the NZCF and is aligned with the RNZAF. Formed in September 1941 originally for the purpose of training young pilots ready for active service. As of 2021 there are 49 ATC squadrons across New Zealand.

The ATC curriculum contains aviation, fieldcraft, drill, leadership, search and rescue (SAR), survival skills, organisational knowledge of NZDF and NZCF and firearms training. National courses are provided in powered flying, aeronautical navigation, gliding and fieldcraft. Each area (Southern, Central, Northern) hold an annual skills competition for all squadrons, focusing on competitive application of core aviation skills, with the winning team from each area later in the year competing at a national competition.

==== NZCF structure ====
The NZDF and the NZCF work together in a combined structure to deliver the NZCF's Mission and Core Values.

The NZDF provides 27 regular force personnel and 6 NZDF civilian employees to perform training development, administration and logistics for Cadet Force operations. These operations are commanded from HQNZCF, based in Trentham Military Camp in Wellington.

There are three Cadet Force Training Support Units (CFTSUs), each covering a Cadet Force region and operating from an NZDF establishment. Northern Area CFTSU is based in RNZAF Base Auckland; Central Area CFTSU at RNZAF Base Ohakea near Palmerston North; and Southern Area CFTSU at Burnham Military Camp just South of Christchurch.

The New Zealand Cadet Force is under the command of the Commandant NZCF. The Commandant of the NZCF is typically given a three-year appointment, however, some choose to renew their appointment, or otherwise are required to leave their command early due to extraordinary circumstances.

Working alongside the NZDF personnel are NZCF Officers and Senior Cadets from all three corps appointed to key strategic, operational and tactical positions.

They provide:

- Policy advice and recommendations that will enhance both the support and training.
- Representation to the community meeting the Government/Community partnership requirement to develop and implement strategies for growth by raising the national profile of the NZCF.
- Quality Control for the cadets by ensuring the content of the entire training programme is relevant and suits the needs of today's youth.

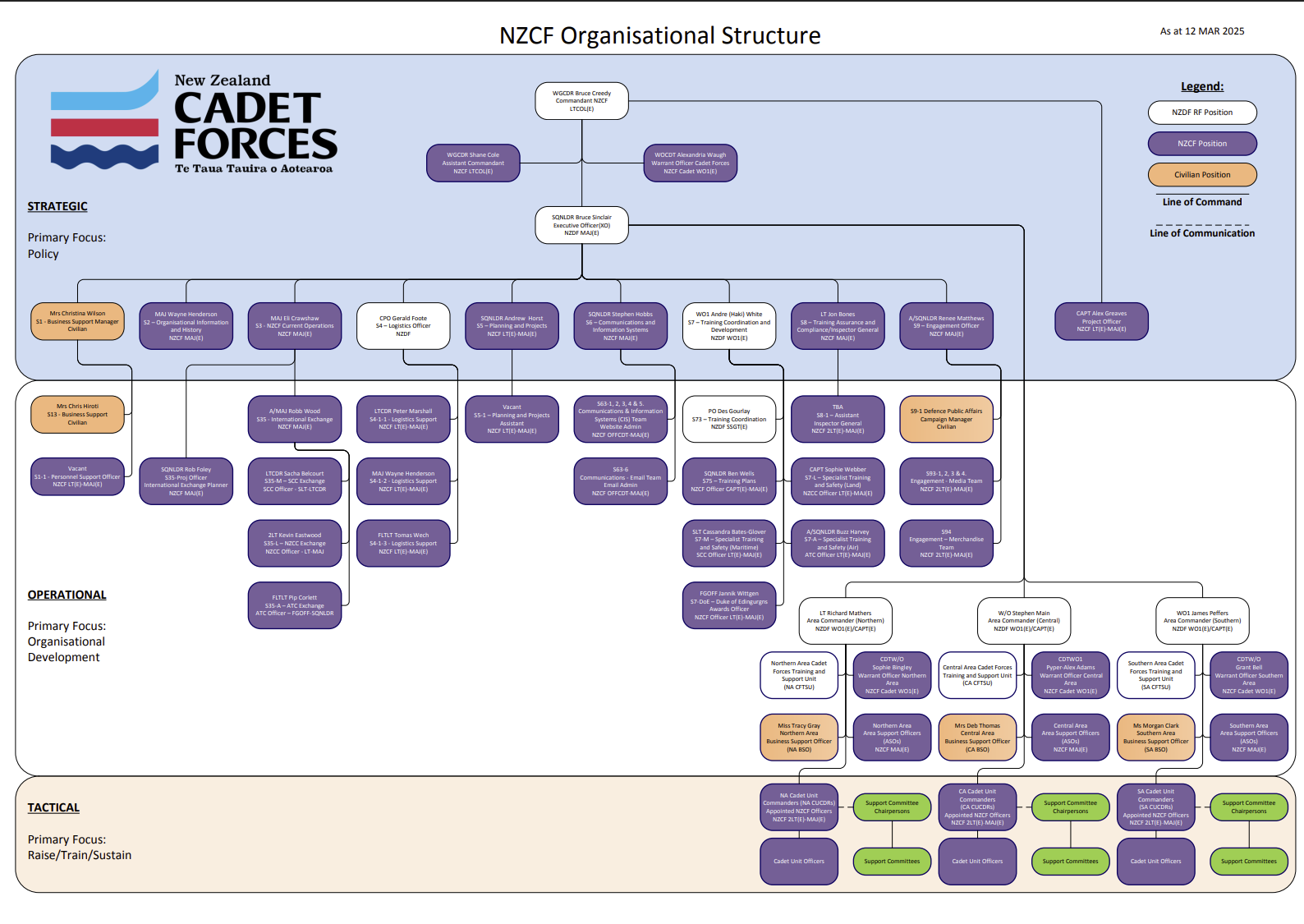
NZCF Structure Chart NZCF Structure Chart (rev. 2025)

=== Recognised civilian support organisations ===
==== Association national executives ====
Three non-profit organisations, the Sea Cadet Corps Association of New Zealand Inc. (SCANZ), the Cadet Corps Association of New Zealand Trust (CCANZ), and the Air Training Corps Association of New Zealand Inc (ATCANZ) have been appointed by the Chief of the Defence Force to play an integral role in the Cadet Forces' management. They are responsible for developing policy in regards to training and NZDF involvement, national marketing, liaison with non-recognised organisations with Cadet Forces involvement, and additional logistical support. They also represent individual units and their support committees in the Standing Committee of the Cadet Advisory Council and via direct consultation from the Commandant Cadet Forces.

All associations have a national executive to deal with the NZCF directly, while each unit is represented by an association branch.

SCANZ has the additional responsibilities of acquiring national resources and assets for SCC training use – as the Navy is unable to provide these facilities – and provide a disputes resolution process for SCC unit support committees.

==== Returned Services Association ====
Returned Services Association

The Royal New Zealand Returned Services Association (RNZRSA) supports NZCF involvement in its ceremonial and commemorative activities, encourages its members to join the support committees of individual cadet units, and provides additional support and resources.

Many RNZRSA members have formally served for branches of the Cadet Forces.

==== Defence Employer Support Council (DESC) ====
Defence Employer Support Council (DESC)

The Defence Employer Support Council is a civilian agency run by the New Zealand Government that works to facilitate good working relationships between NZDF Reservists, Cadet Force Officers, and their civilian employers. The Council liaises with the Minister of Defence on matters related to Reserves and also NZDF youth programmes (the NZCF and Limited Service Volunteers).

The focus of the DESC is for members to use their knowledge, networks and experience to:

1. Engage with the employers of Reserve Force members and New Zealand Cadet Force officers;
2. Open doors to civilian employment opportunities for members of the:
  1. Limited Service Volunteer programme;
  2. New Zealand Cadet Forces; and
  3. Regular Force members who are transitioning from the NZDF; and to
3. Foster relationships with employers to identify potential NZDF opportunities where members with unique skills are needed by the NZDF

NZCF Officers of all branches are encouraged to reach out to DESC for support with their civilian employer if they feel they need it. Occasionally the DESC also facilitate the recruitment of new NZCF Officers from retiring Defence Force personnel who still want to contribute to New Zealand.

Each year the DESC hold an award ceremony to recognise and reward employers who ensure that Cadet Force Officers are able to not just meet their commitments, but provide the support needed for Officers to succeed and thrive. This can be by providing Officers with the leave they need to go on their commissioning course, other mandatory courses, attend unit activities, or by providing resources to help facilitate the operation of New Zealand Cadet Forces. Officers nominate their employer through the DESC website, and support the application with written testimony including examples of how their employer supports their position in the NZCF.

New Zealand Cadet Force Officer Employer of the Year
Year	Employer of the Year	Runner up Employer of the Year
2023	Toi Ohomai – Te Pūkenga, Tauranga	The Electrical Training Company (ETCO)
2022	Tuatahi First Fibre	
2021	McKenna King Ltd	
2020	Lumen Engineering Consultant Services	Enrich+
2019	Pringle Beleski and Associates	

==== Cadet Unit Support Committees ====
Each individual unit has a Cadet Unit Support Committee. Made up of voluntary members of the community, often parents and relatives of cadets, the committees assist units with fundraising and the supply of voluntary labour and resources when required.

== Rank structure ==
=== Commissioned officers ===
NZCF Active List

NZCF Active Service is defined under Cadet Force Order 1 (CFO 1). Every NZCF Officer appointed to the strength of an NZCF Cadet Unit, to HQ NZCF or a CFTSU will be held on the Active List and has the option of taking Cadet Unit Commander's Leave or transferring either to the Non active List of that unit or to the NZCF Reserve or NZCF Standby Reserve as the regulations allow.

NZCF Non-Active List

The NZCF Non-Active List is for NZCF Officers who are unable to meet the requirements of efficient service for a period greater than three months and who do not wish to resign their NZCF commission. The maximum period an officer will be transferred to the Non-Active List is 12 months.

Commissioned Personnel Ranks
Navy Cadets	Army Cadets	Air Cadets	Notes
Commander (CDR)	Lieutenant Colonel (LTCOL)	Wing Commander (WGCDR)	This rank is held only by the Assistant Commandant, NZCF
Lieutenant Commander (LTCDR)	Major (MAJ)	Squadron Leader (SQNLDR)	
Lieutenant (LT)	Captain (CAPT)	Flight Lieutenant (FLTLT)	
Sub Lieutenant (SLT)	Lieutenant (LT)	Flying Officer (FGOFF)	
Ensign (ENS)	Second Lieutenant (2LT)	Pilot Officer (PLTOFF)	
Officer Cadet (OFFCDT)	Officer Cadet (OFFCDT)	Officer Cadet (OFFCDT)	Previously only available to students on a NZCF Commissioning Course, this has been changed to replace the rank of Under Officer.

Note: Once an Officer Cadet passes the Commissioning Course, they are promoted to the rank of Acting Ensign (A/ENS), Acting Second lieutenant (A/2LT), or Acting Pilot officer (A/PLTOFF).

Commissioned Officer Rank and Insignia

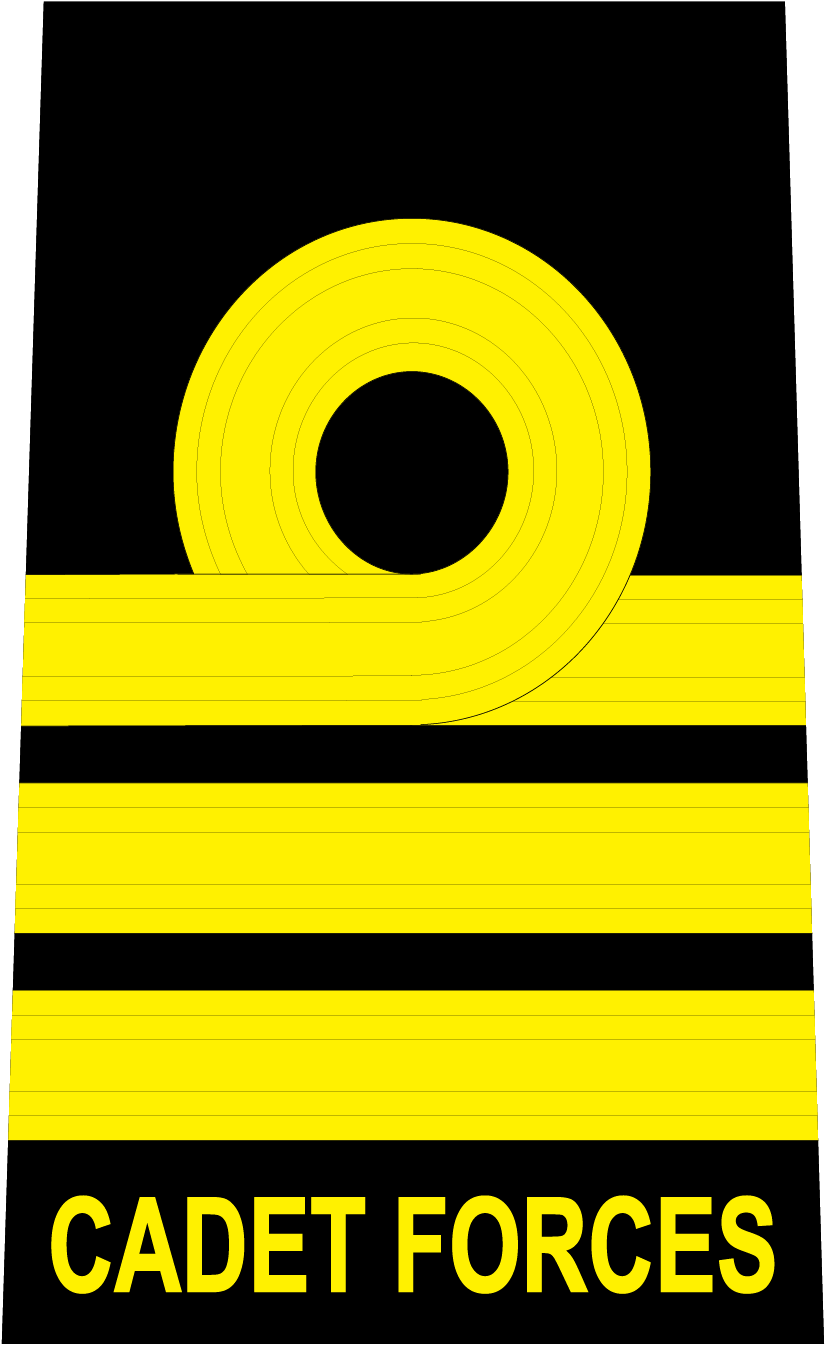
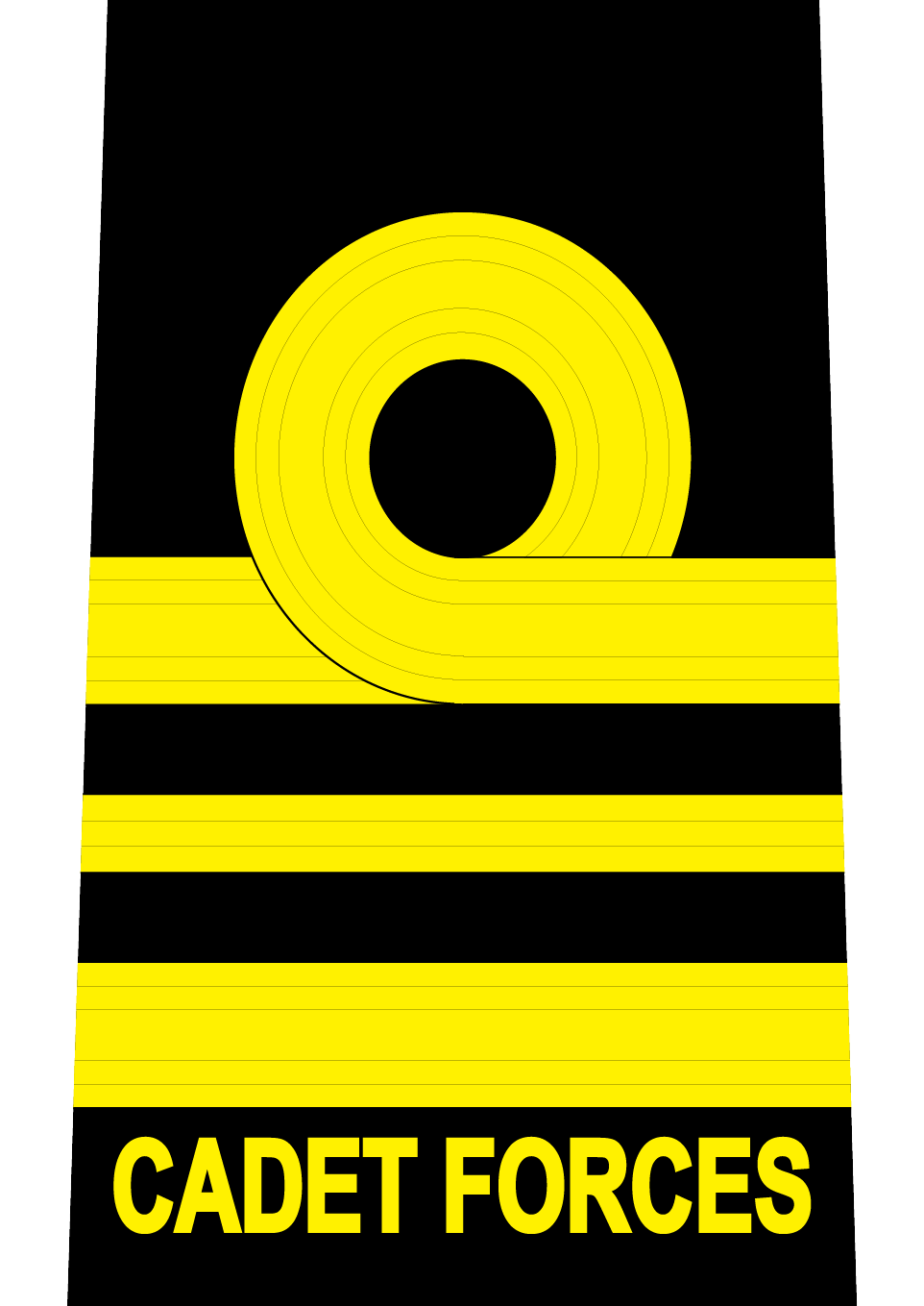
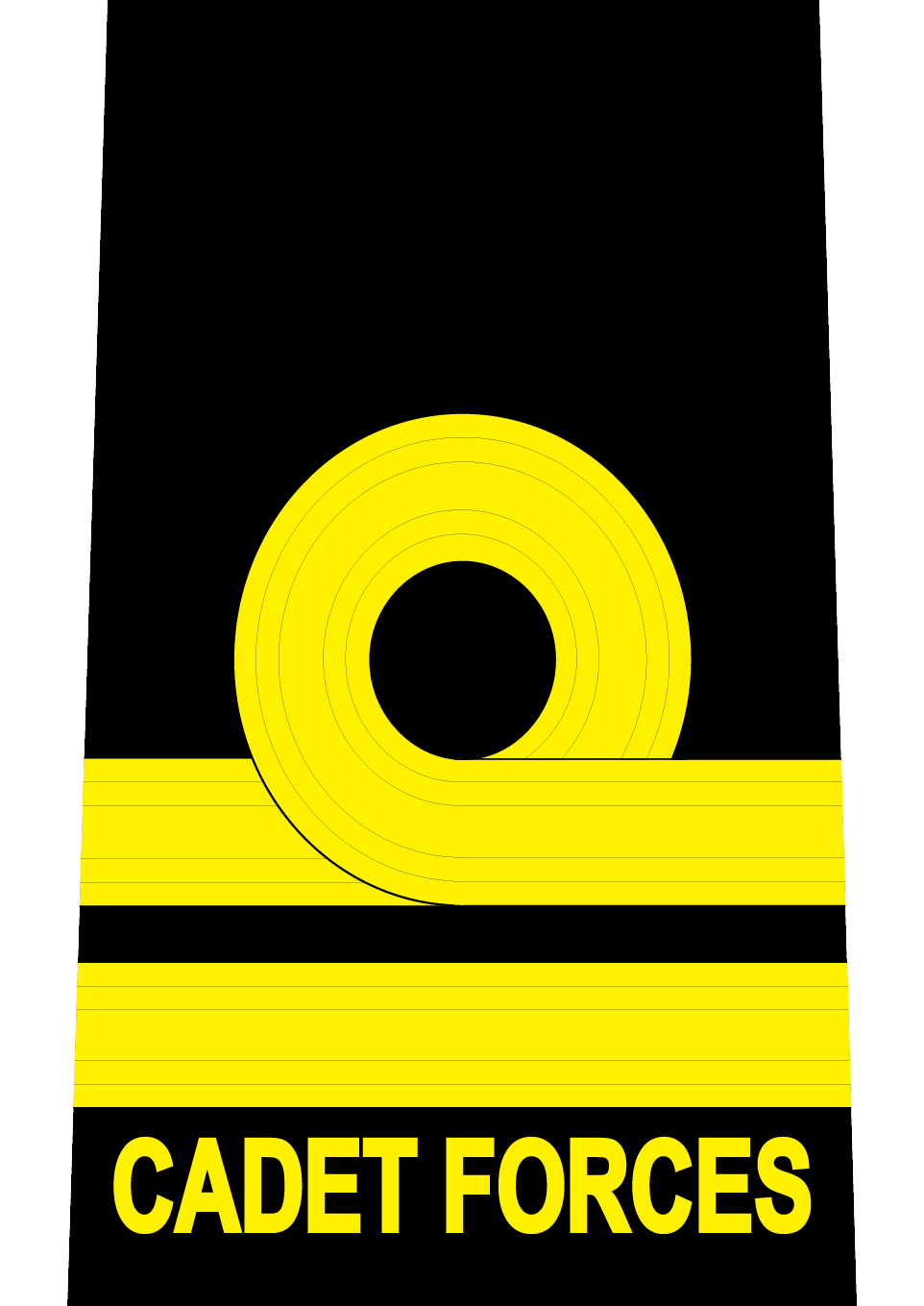
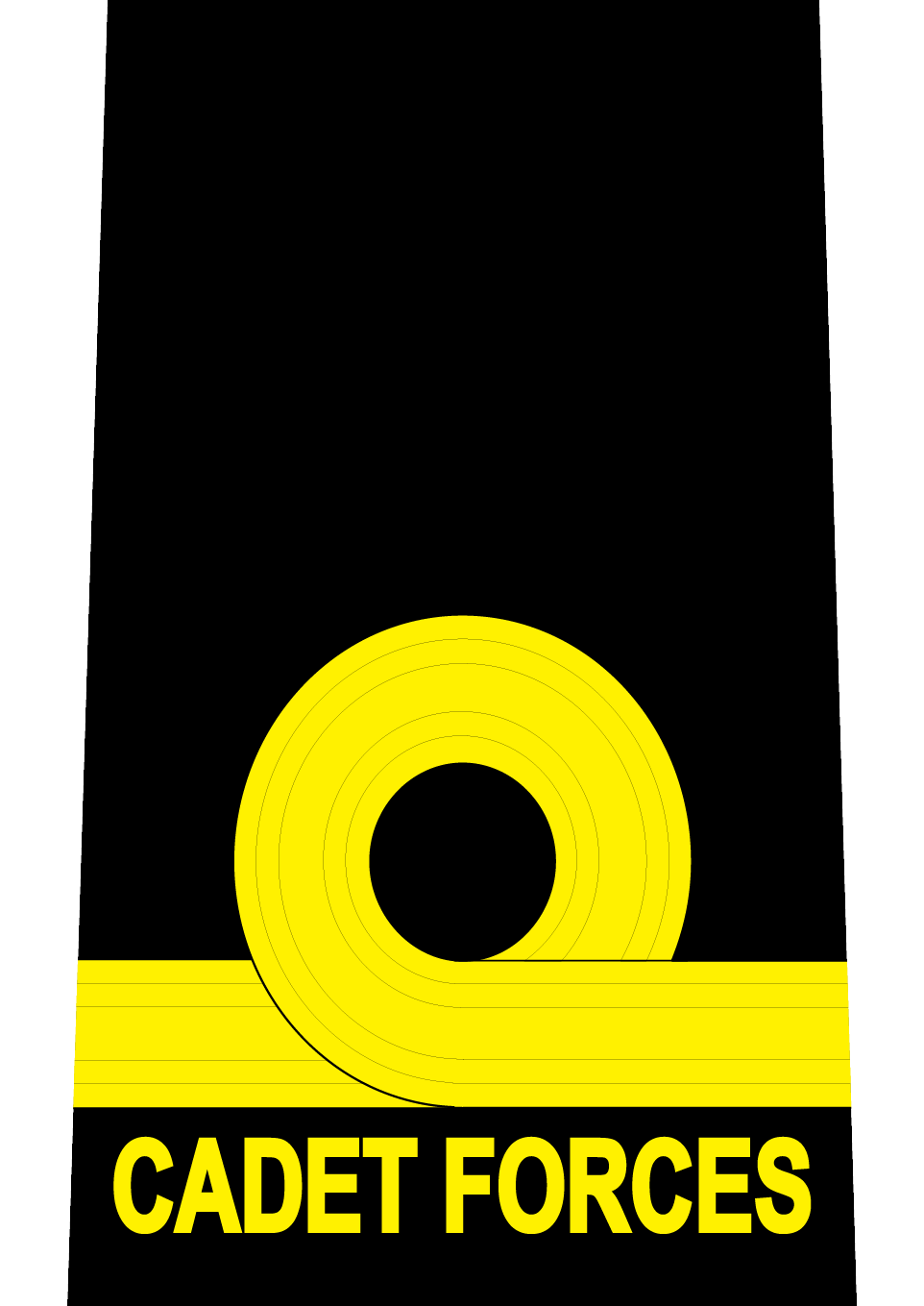
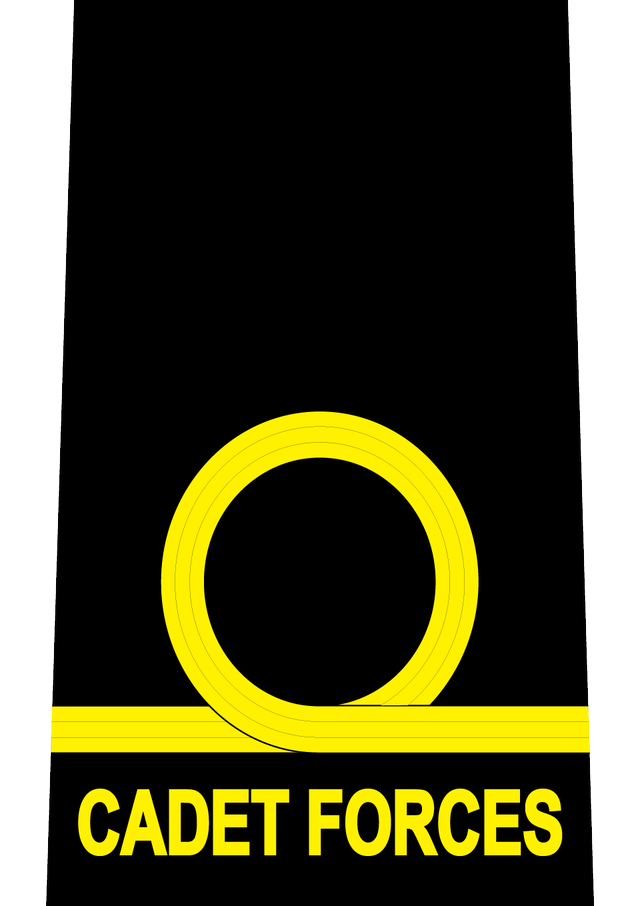
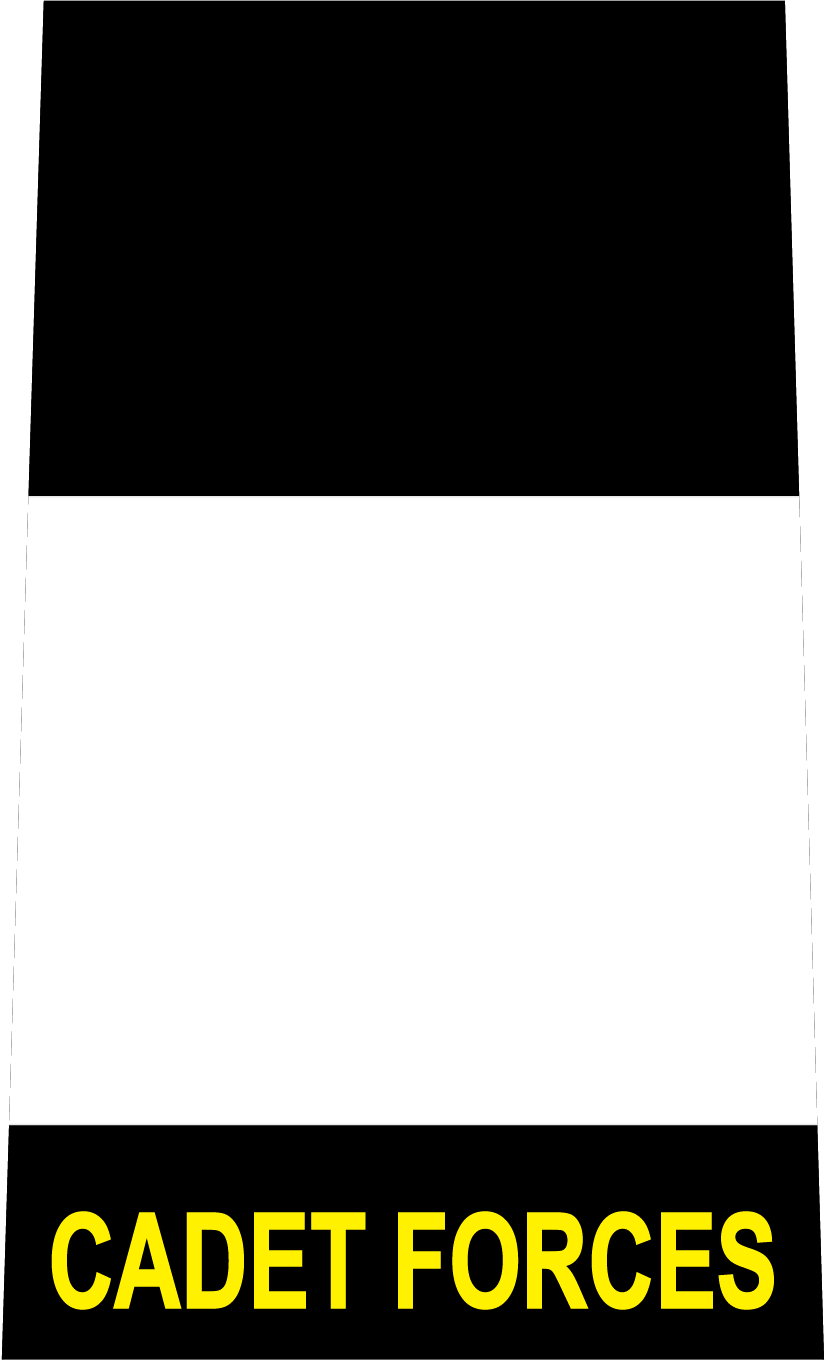
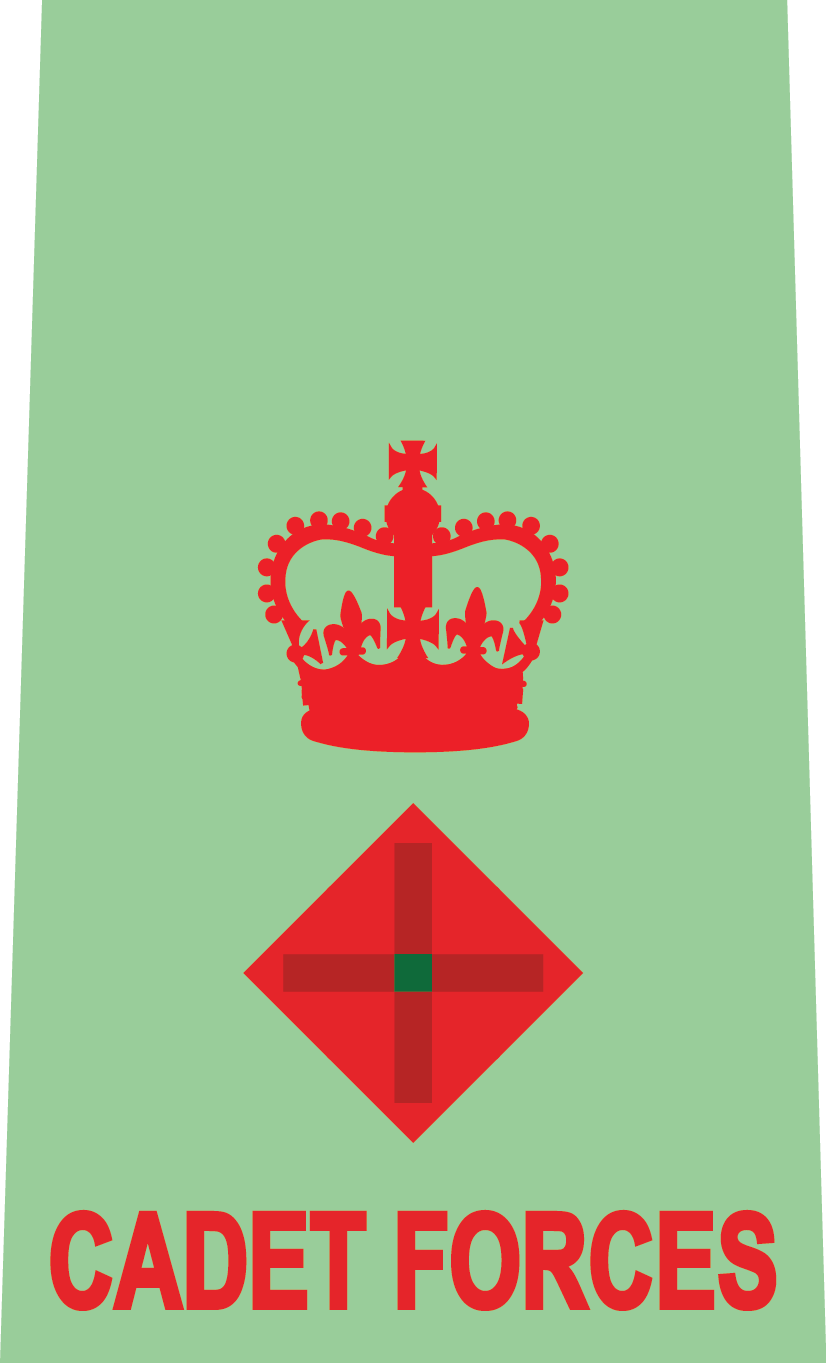
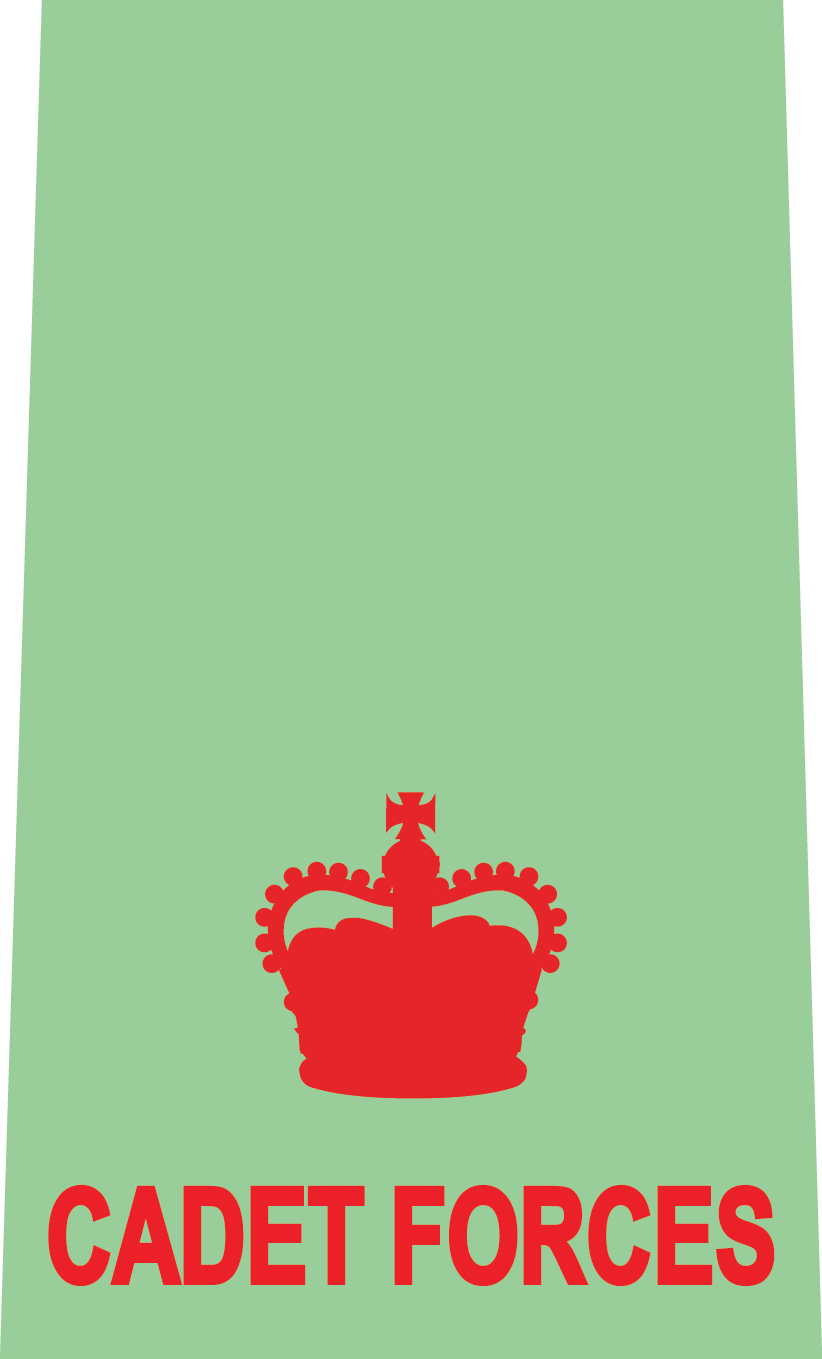
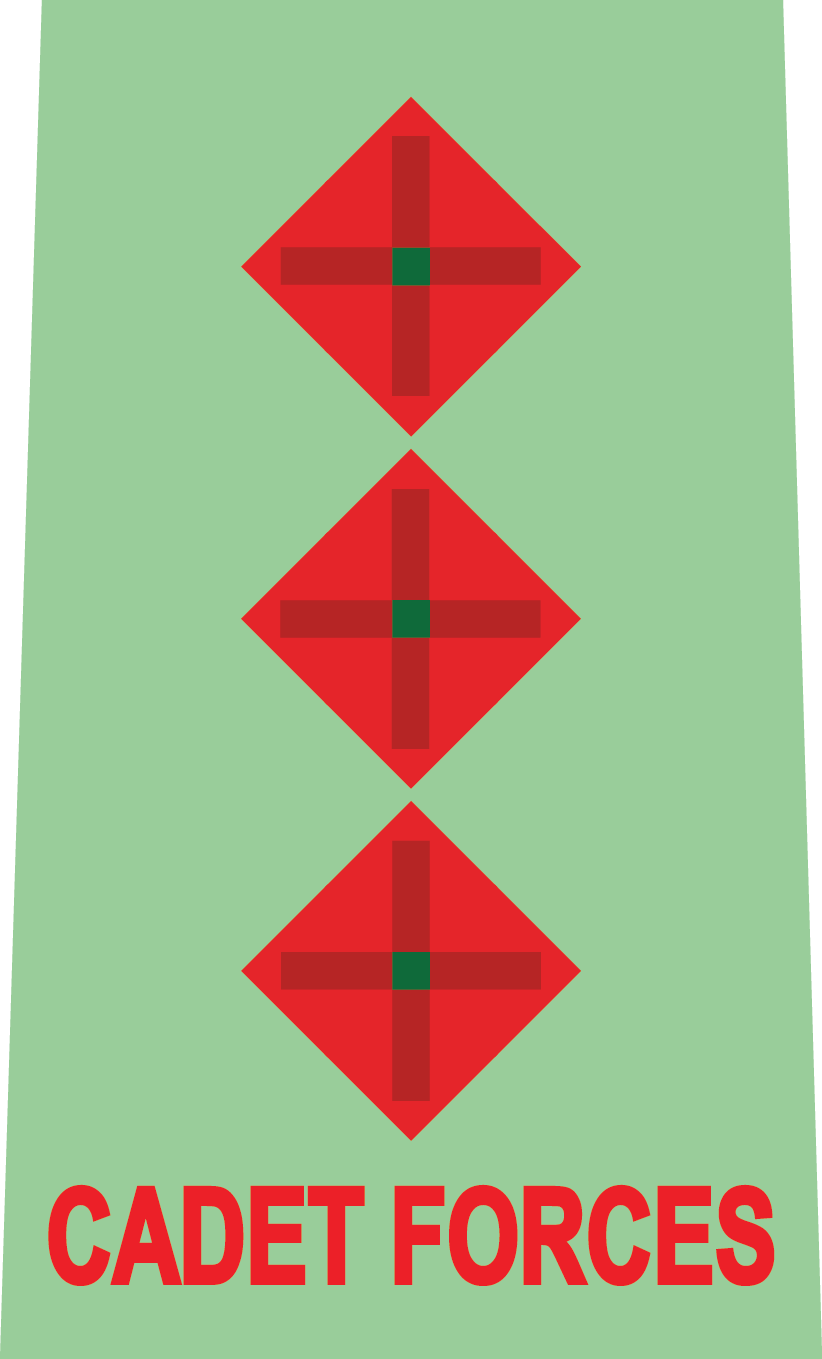
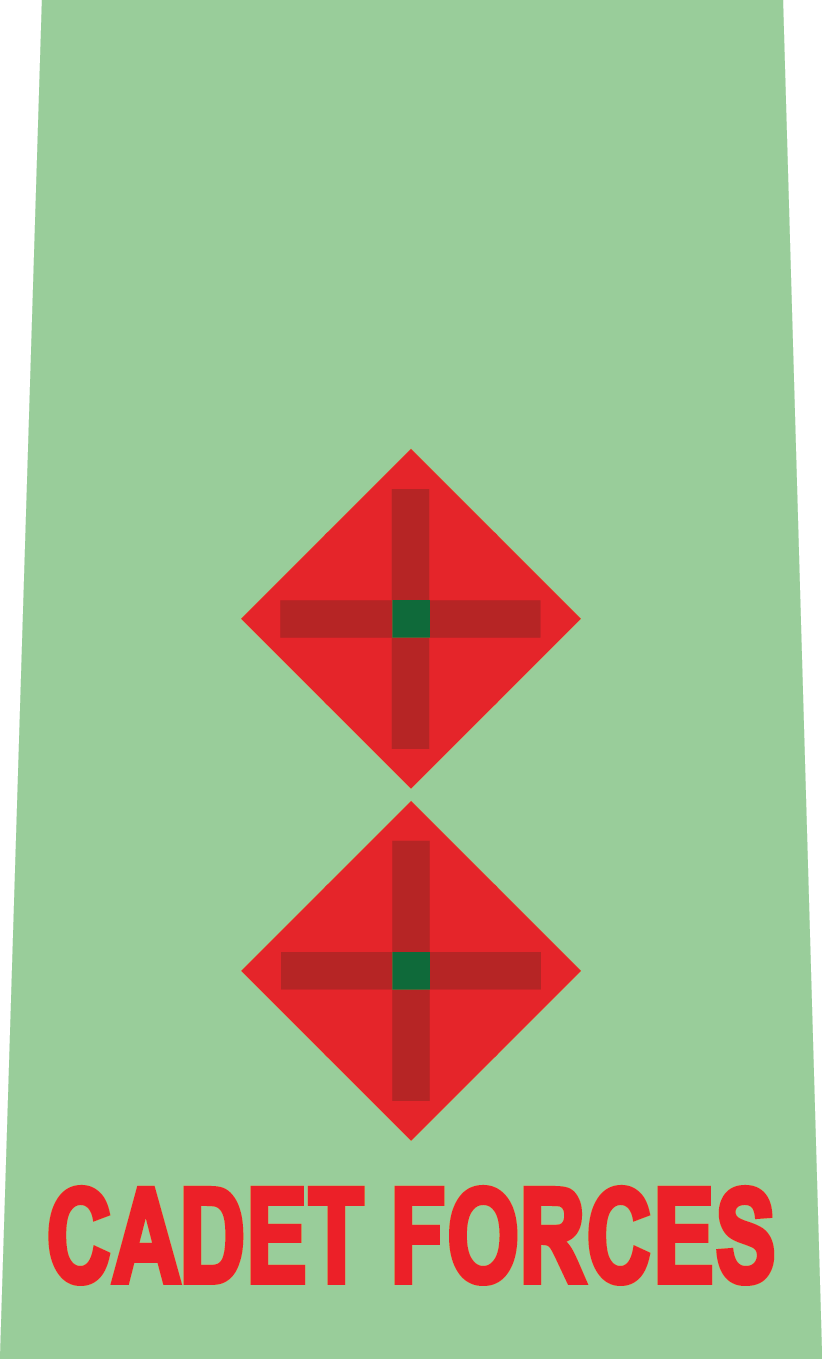
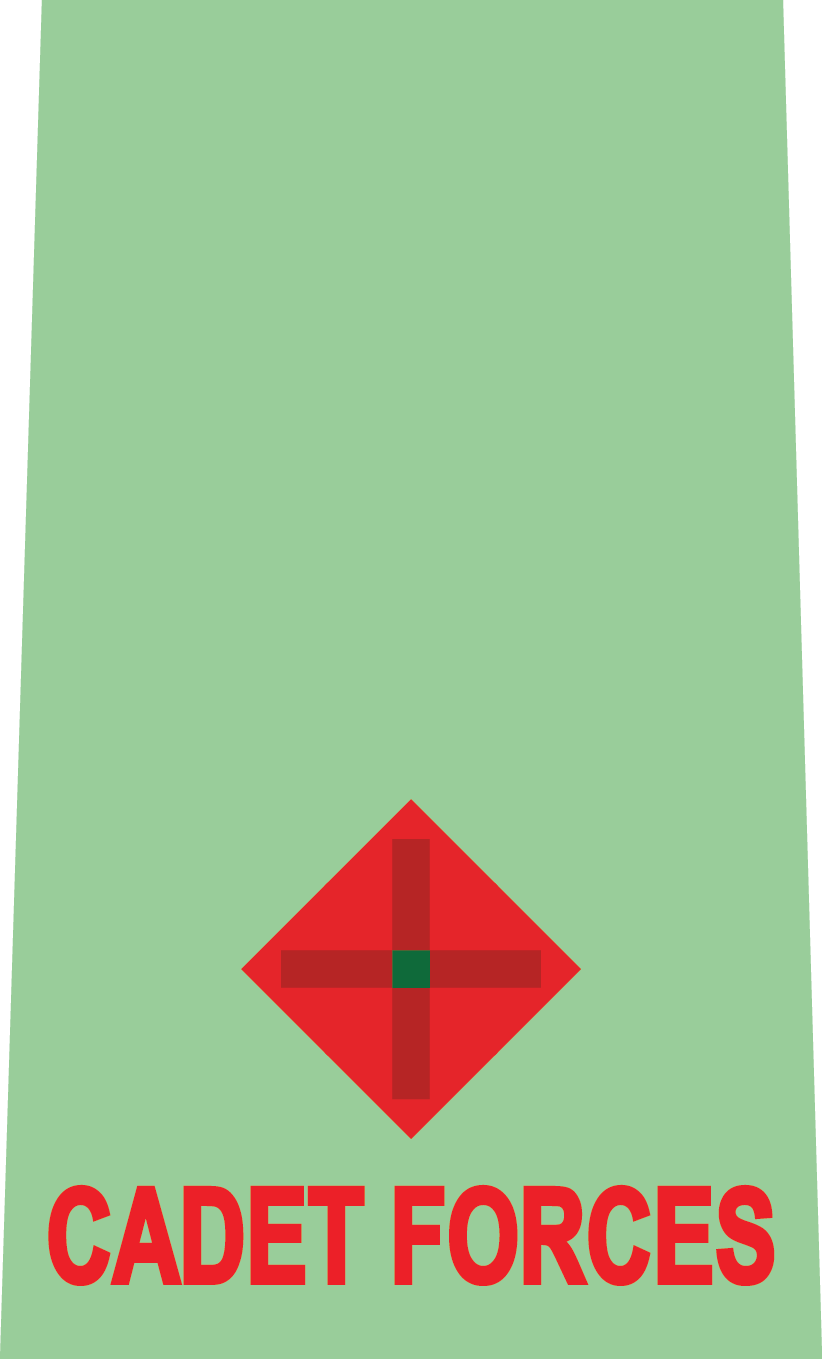
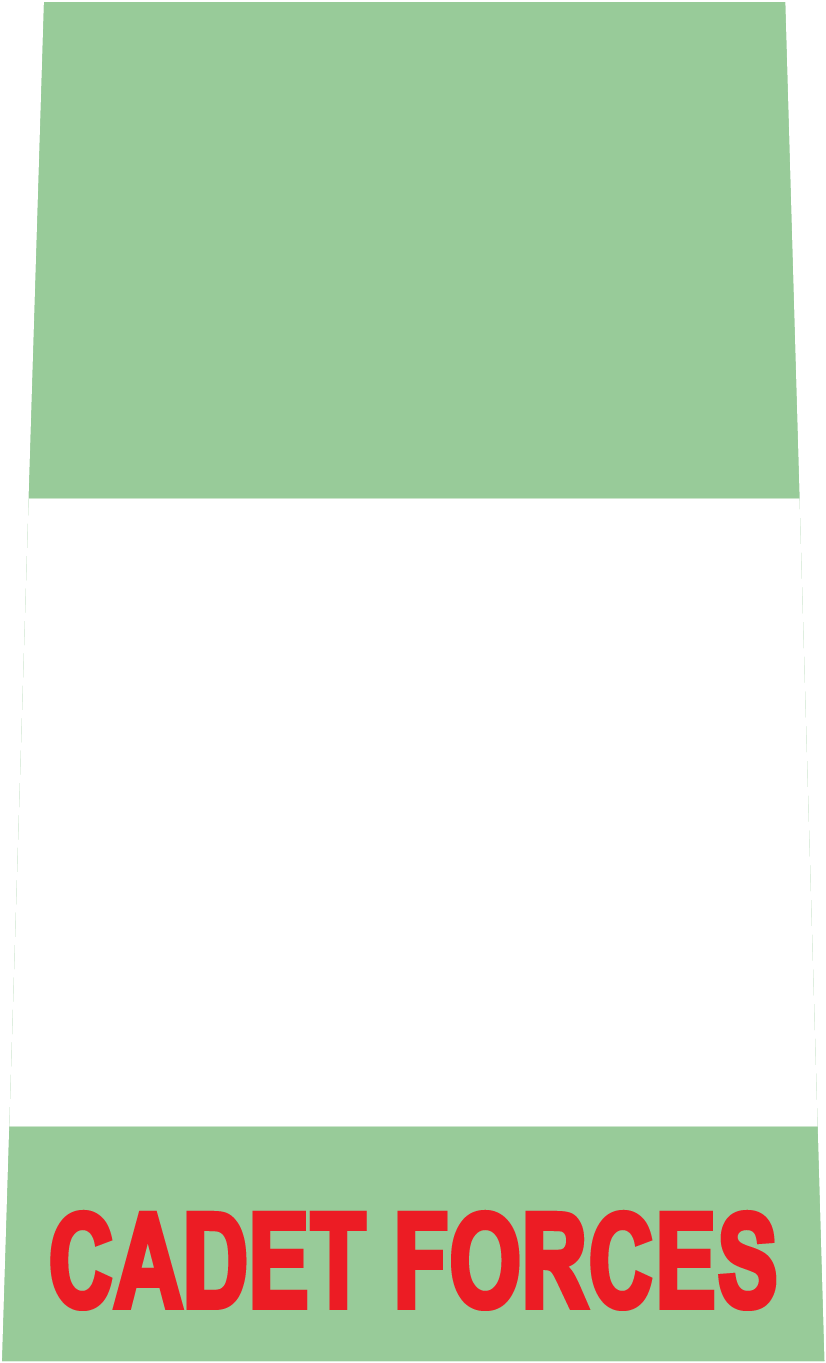
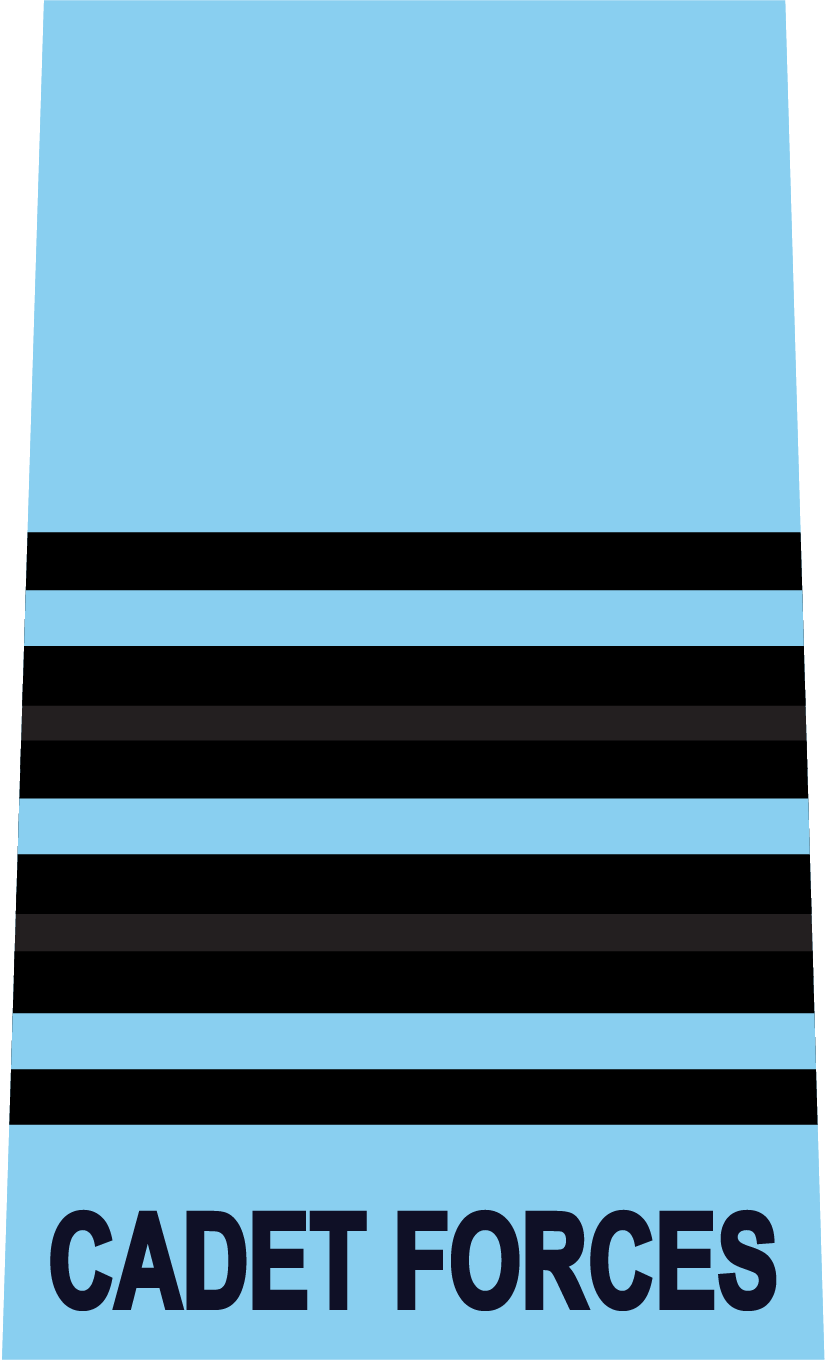
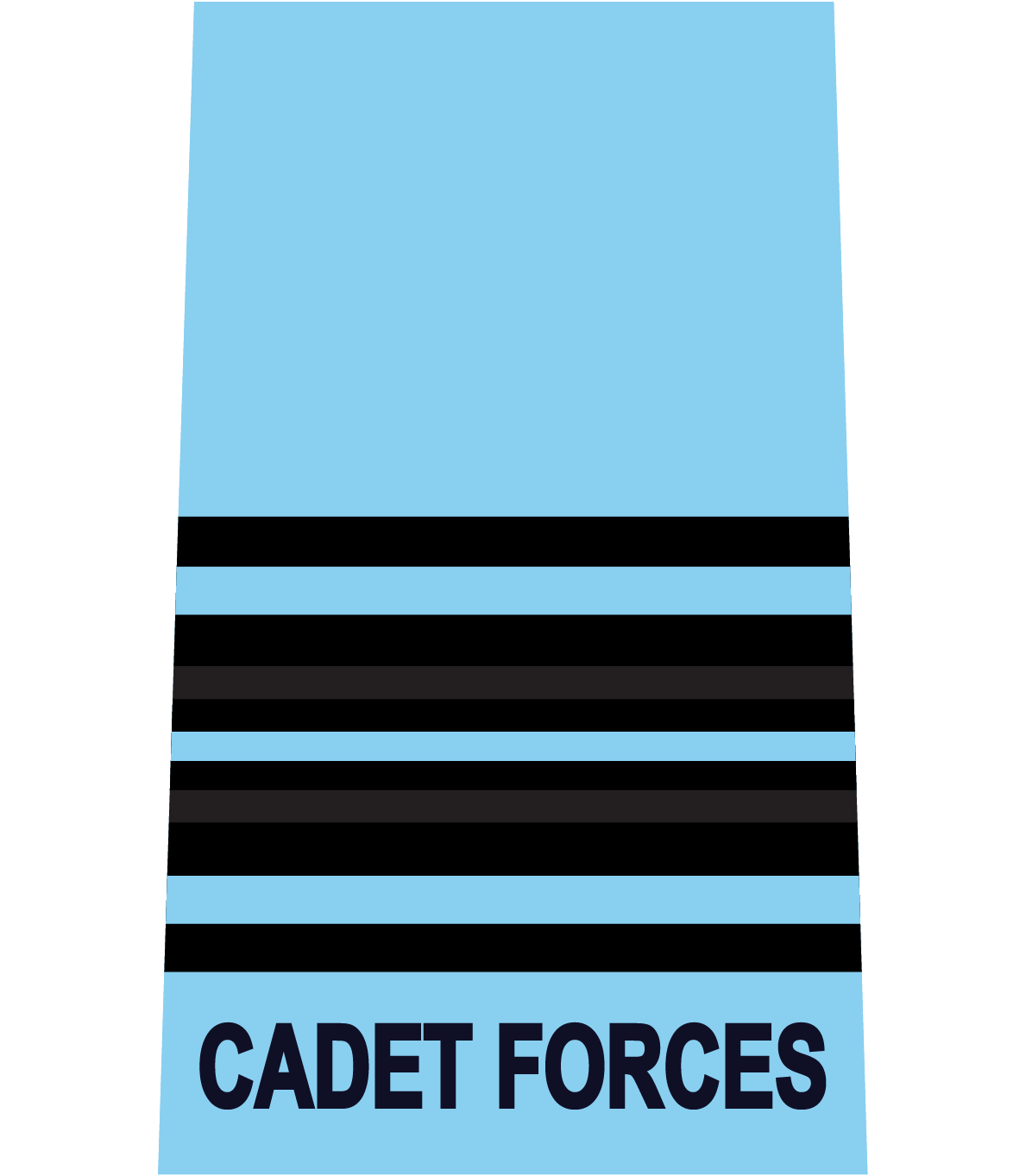
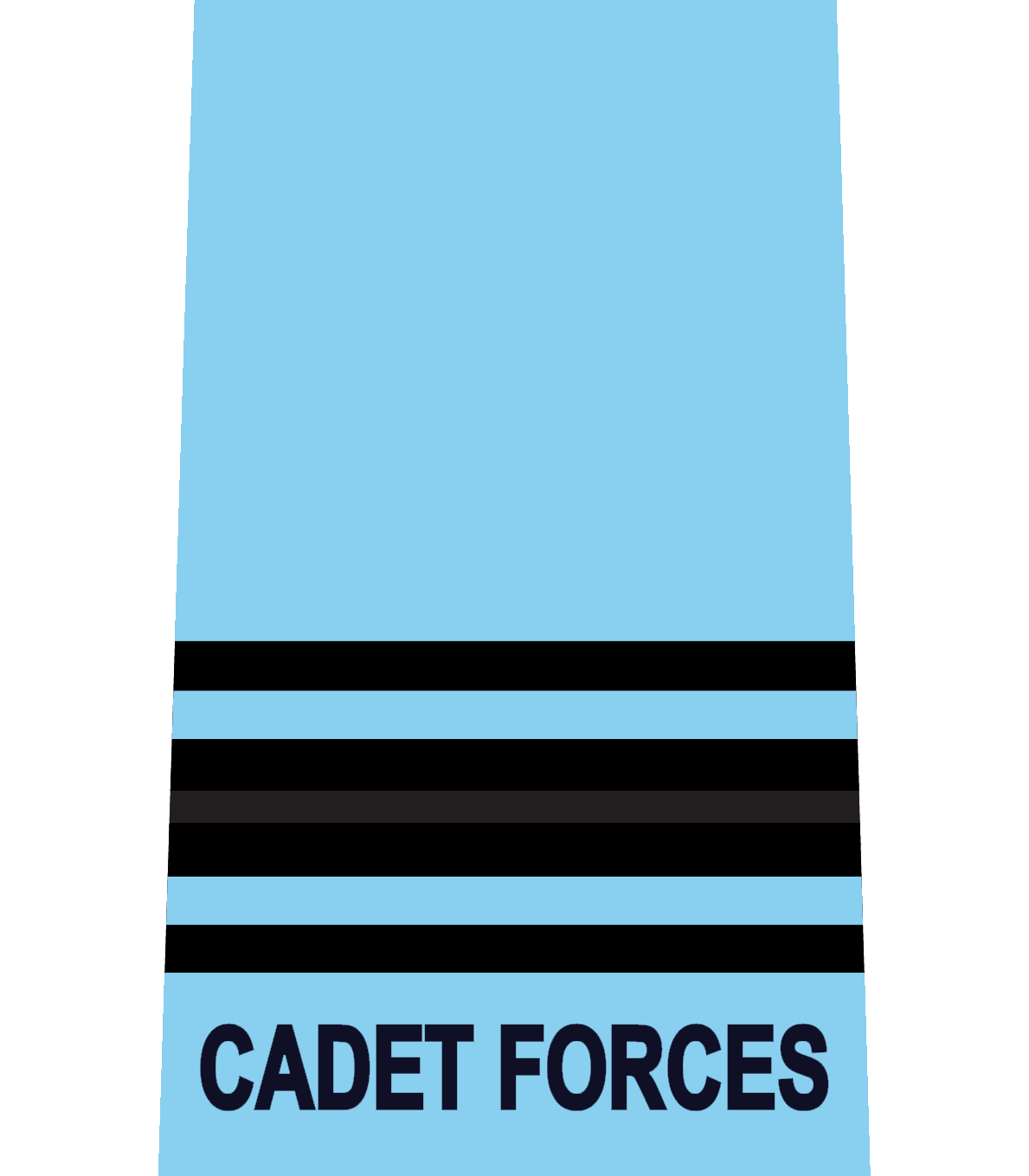
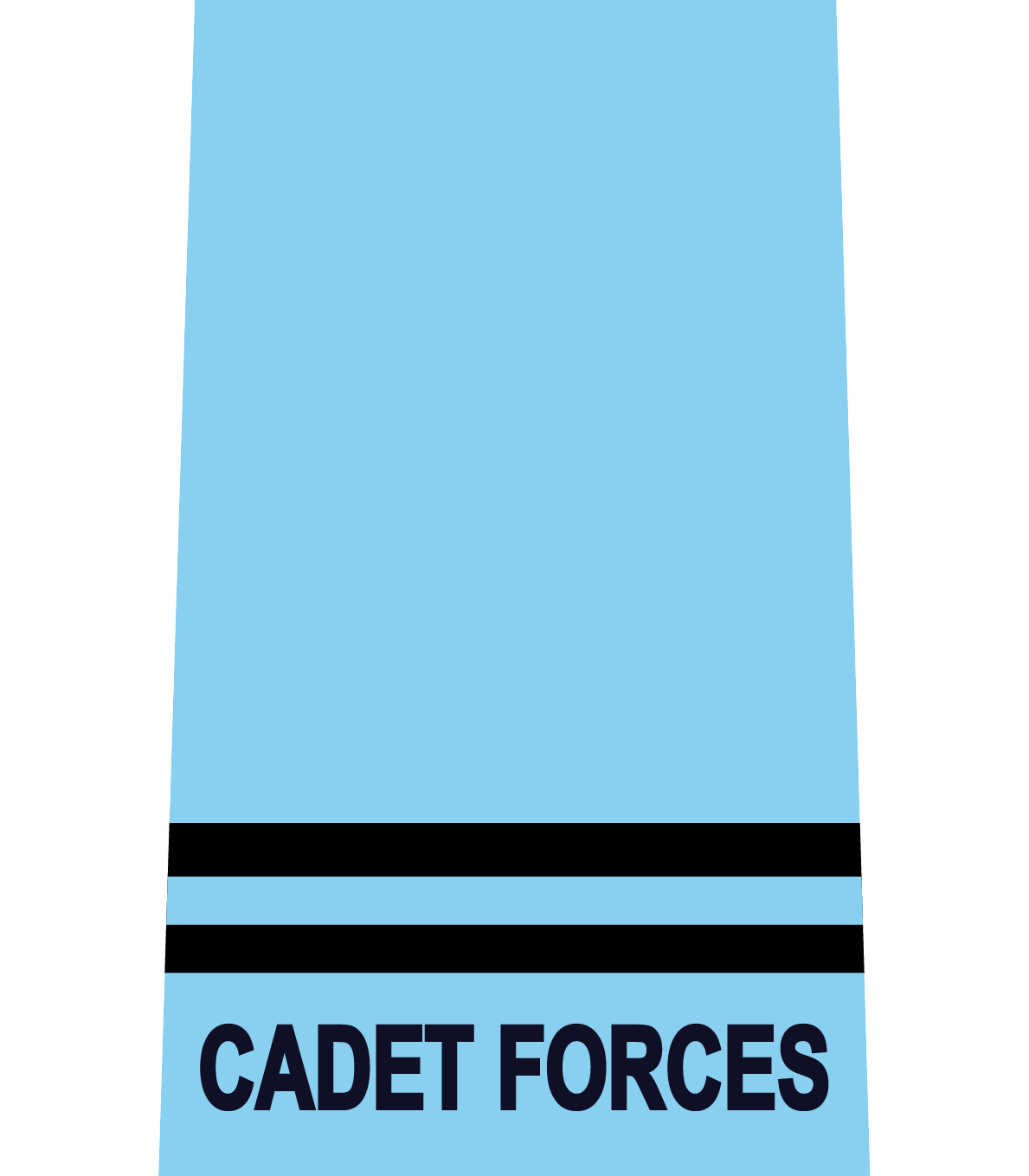
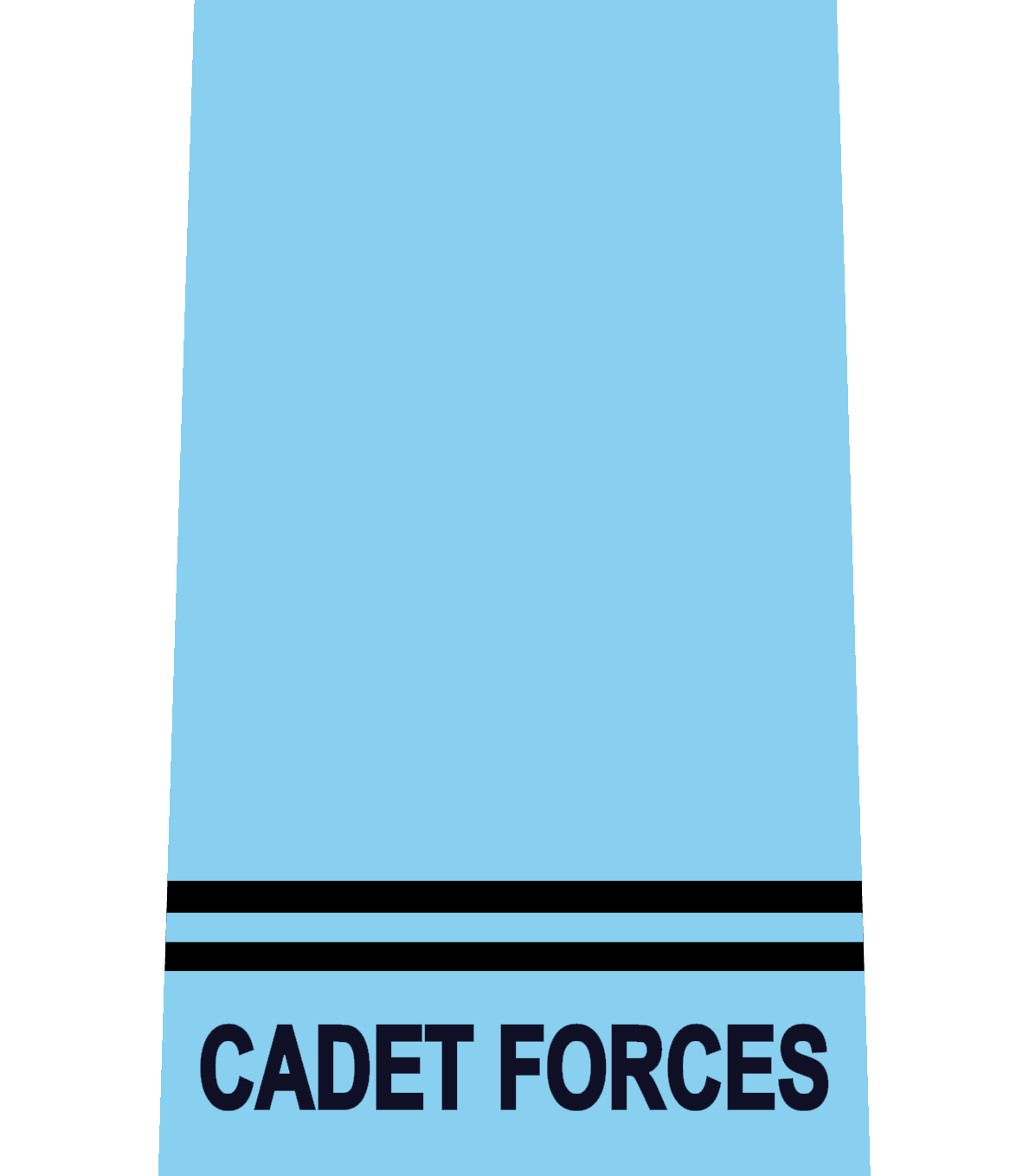
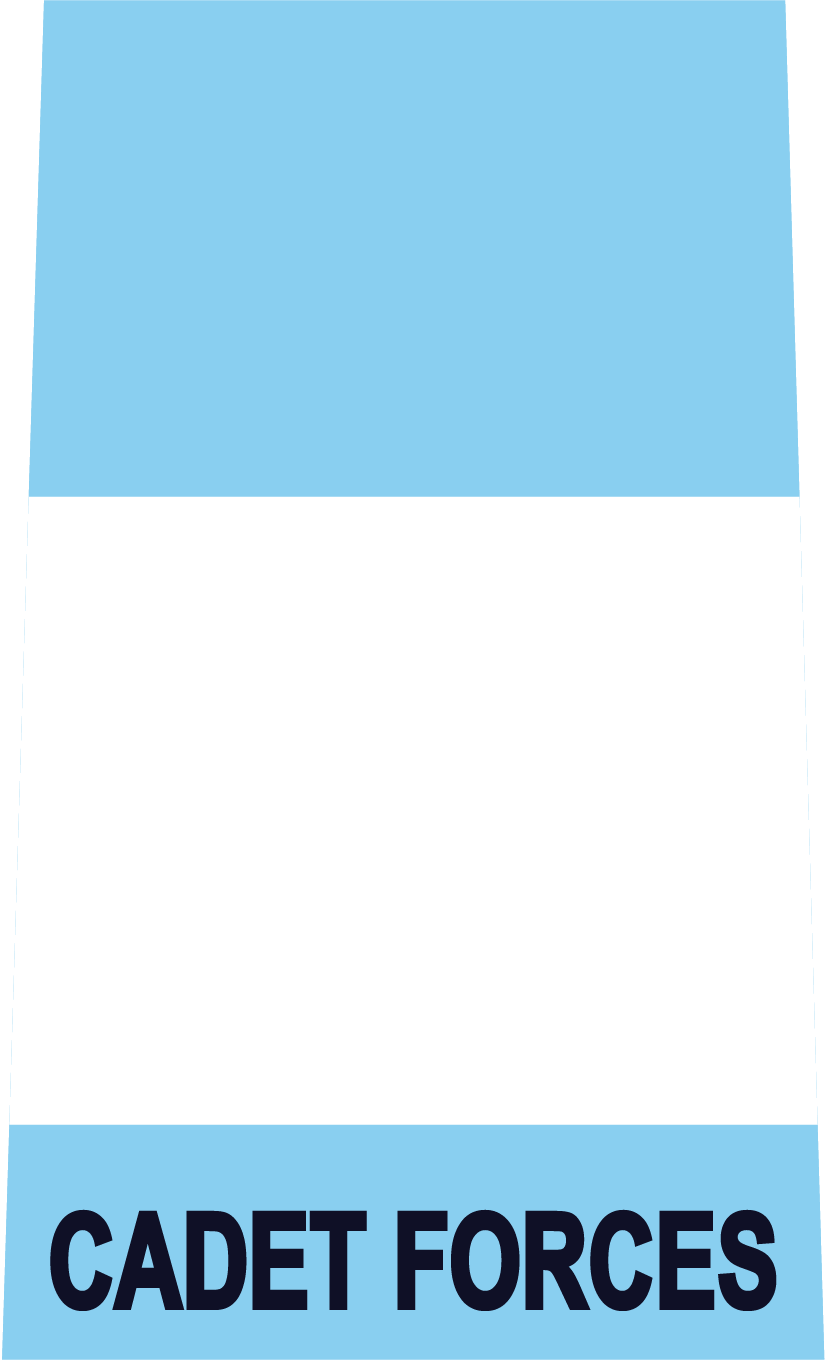
NZCF Officers	OFF 6	OFF 5	OFF 4	OFF 3	OFF 2	OFF 1
Navy Cadets
Navy Cadets	Commander	Lieutenant; Commander	Lieutenant	Sub Lieutenant	Ensign	Officer cadet
Navy Cadets	CDR	LTCDR	LT	SLT	ENS	OFFCDT
NZCF Officers	OFF 6	OFF 5	OFF 4	OFF 3	OFF 2	OFF 1
Army Cadets
Army Cadets	Lieutenant; Colonel	Major	Captain	Lieutenant	Second; Lieutenant	Officer cadet
Army Cadets	LTCOL	MAJ	CAPT	LT	2LT	OFFCDT
NZCF Officers	OFF 6	OFF 5	OFF 4	OFF 3	OFF 2	OFF 1
Air Cadets
Air Cadets	Wing; Commander	Squadron; Leader	Flight; Lieutenant	Flying; Officer	Pilot; Officer	Officer cadet
Air Cadets	WGCDR	SQNLDR	FLTLT	FGOFF	PLTOFF	OFFCDT

=== Cadet ranks ===
Cadet Ranks
Navy Cadets	Army Cadets	Air Cadets	Notes
Warrant Officer Cadet (WOCDT)	Cadet Warrant Officer Class One (CDTWO1)	Warrant Officer (CDTW/O)	The Warrant Officer of the NZCF and Area Warrant Officers in the New Zealand Cadet Corps hold the rank of CDTWO1.
No Equivalent	Cadet Warrant Officer Class Two (CDTWO2)	No Equivalent	NZCC Warrant Officers at unit level are CDTWO2s.
Chief Petty Officer Cadet (CPOCDT)	Cadet Staff Sergeant (CDTSSGT)	Cadet Flight Sergeant (CDTF/S)	
Petty Officer Cadet (POCDT)	Cadet Sergeant (CDTSGT)	Cadet Sergeant (CDTSGT)	Can be awarded after completing an SNCO course.
Leading Cadet (LCDT)	Cadet Corporal (CDTCPL)	Cadet Corporal (CDTCPL)	Can be awarded after completing a JNCO course.
Able Cadet (ACDT)	Cadet Lance Corporal (CDTLCPL)	Leading Air Cadet (LAC)	This is the first JNCO rank, and is typically awarded after completing the 2nd or 3rd year of training.
Ordinary Cadet (OCDT)	Cadet (CDT)	Cadet (CDT)	Awarded after 6 months of Attending Cadets
Cadet Under Training (CDTUT)	Cadet Under Training (CDTUT)	Cadet Under Training (CDTUT)	

Note: Promotions are not purely based on meeting requirements, there are many factors that come into play such as how many Cadets are a part of the unit, do they need more higher ranking NCO's/Cadets. However it is at the Unit Commanders Discretion to promote Cadets as they see fit.

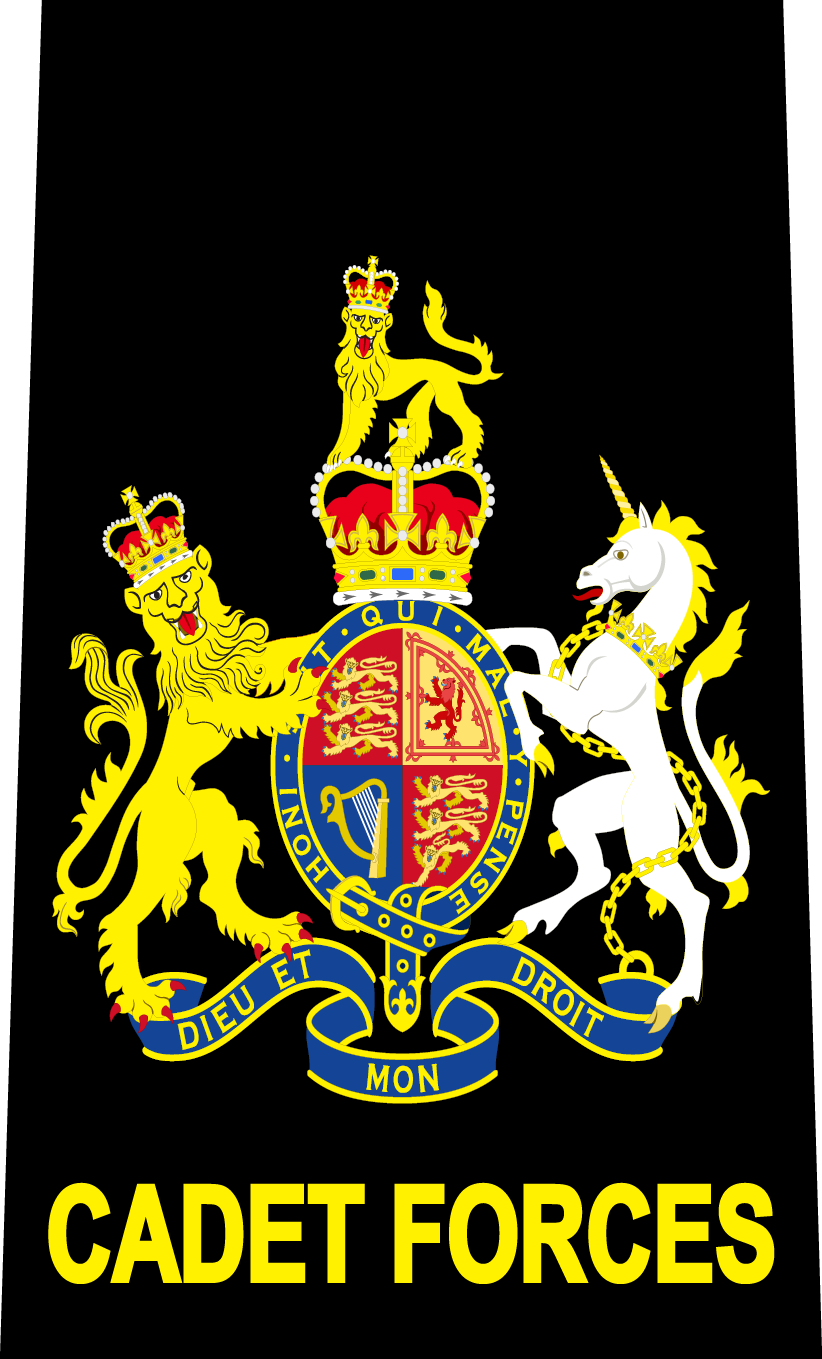
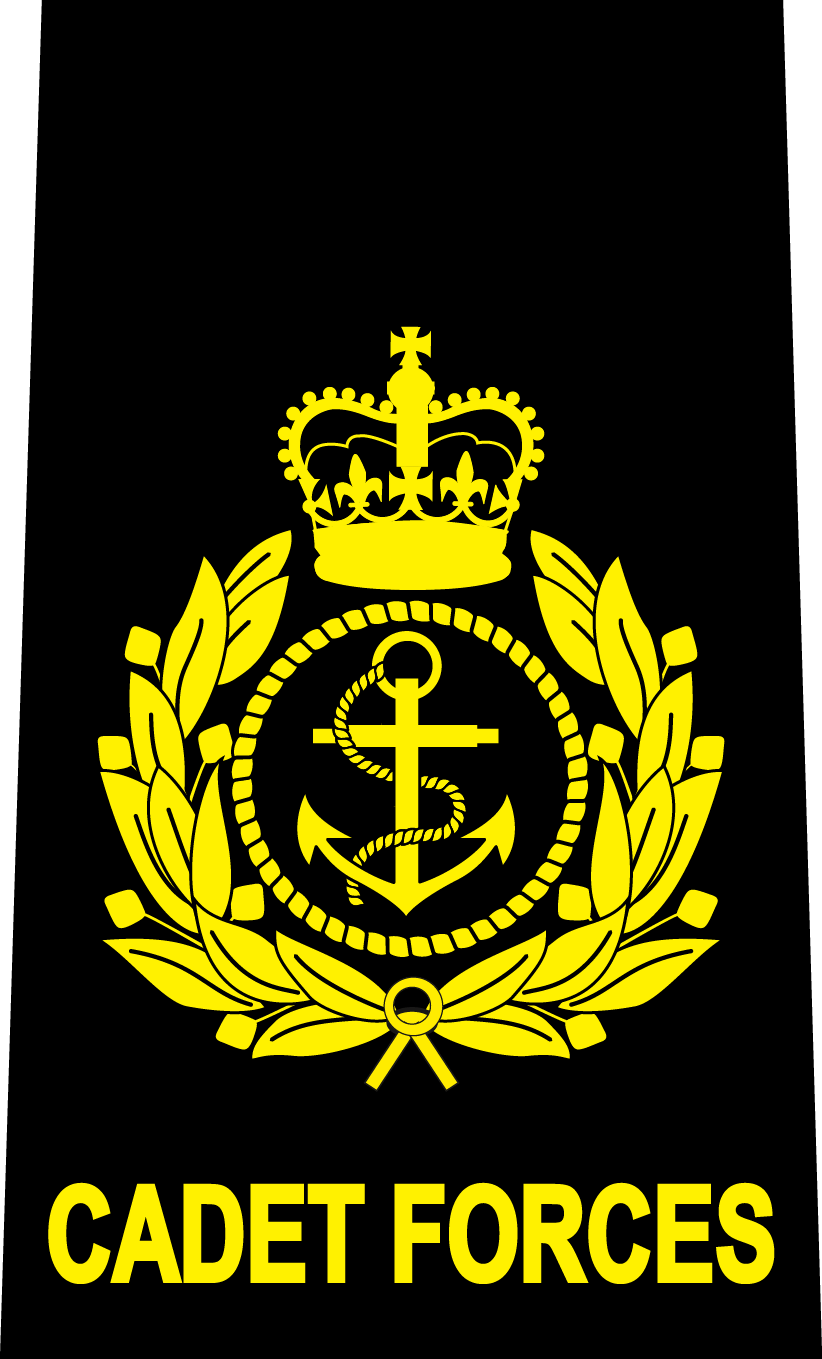
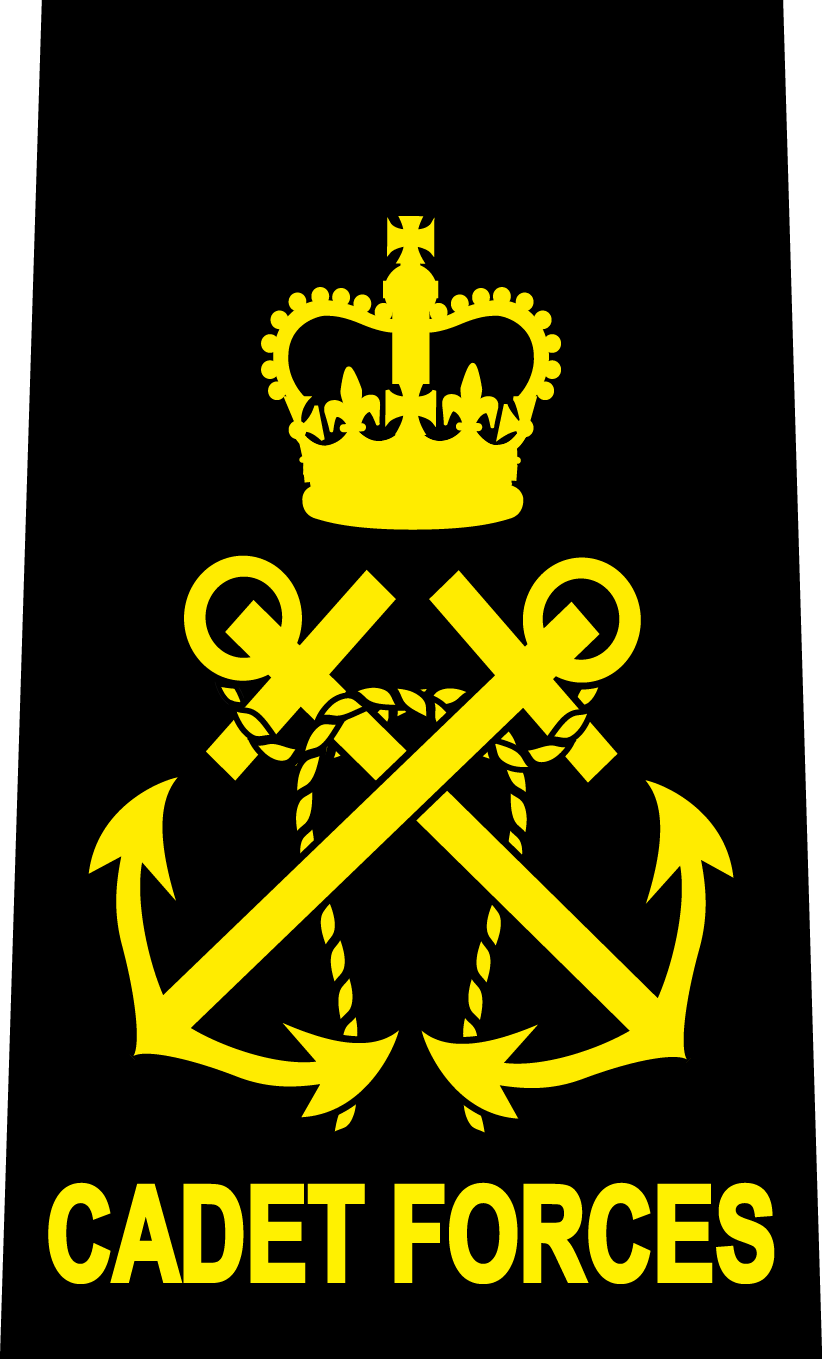
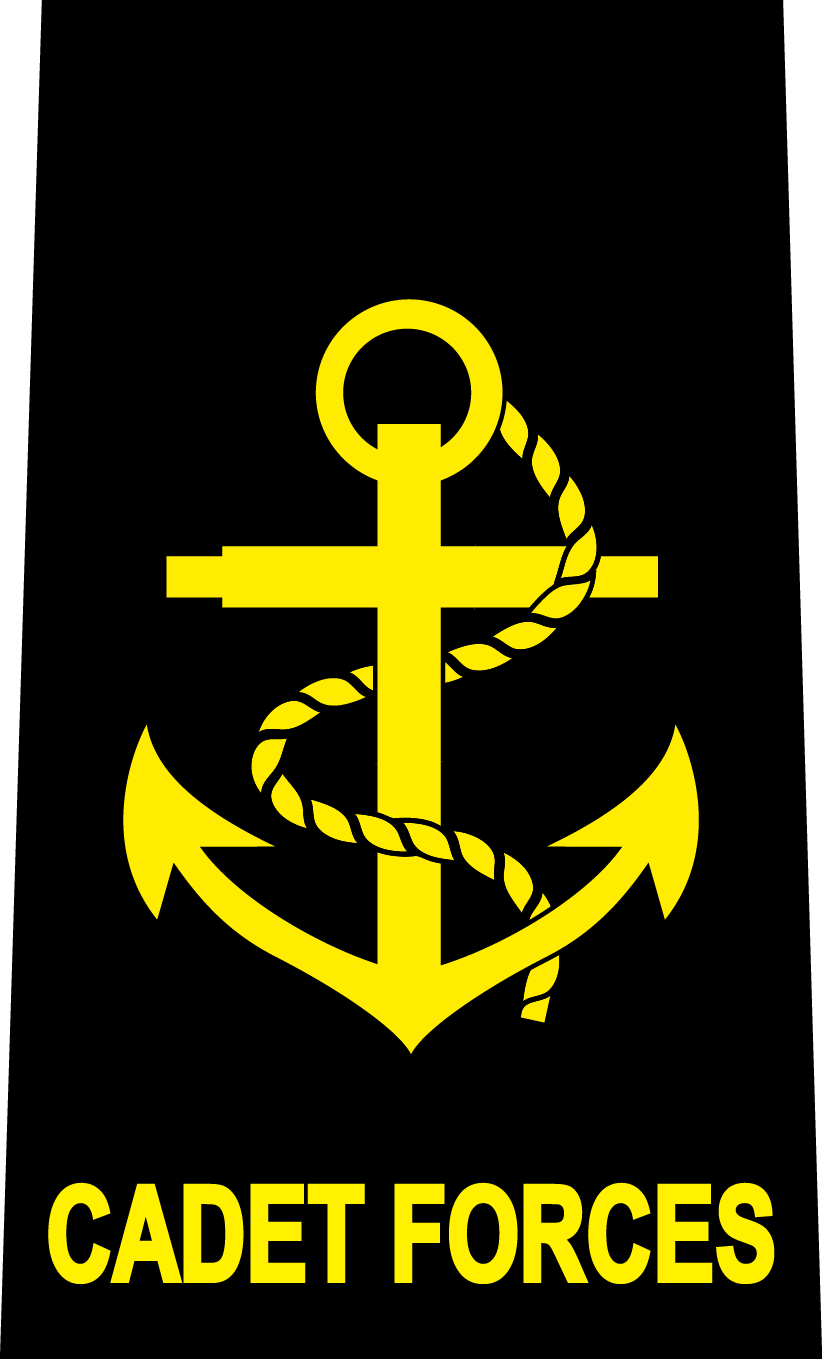
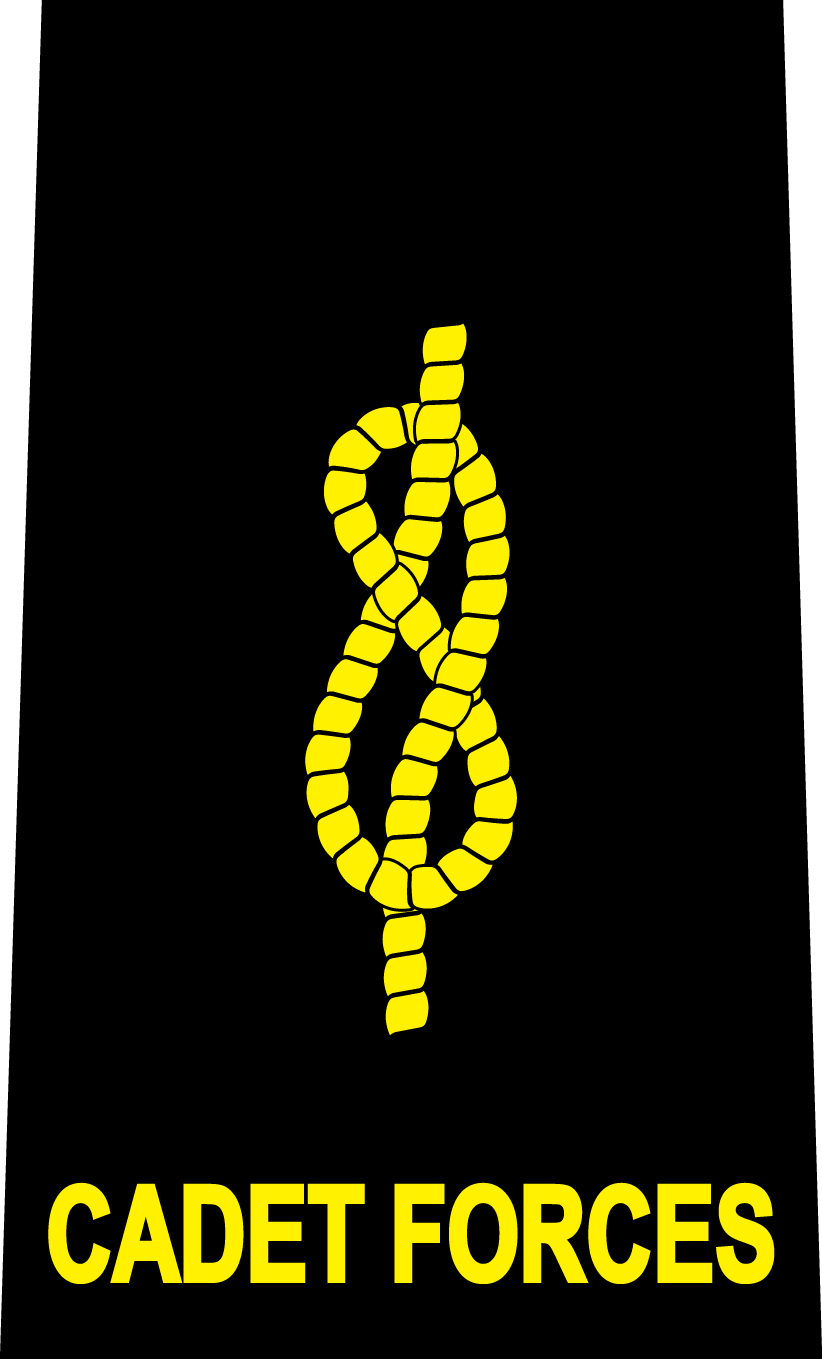
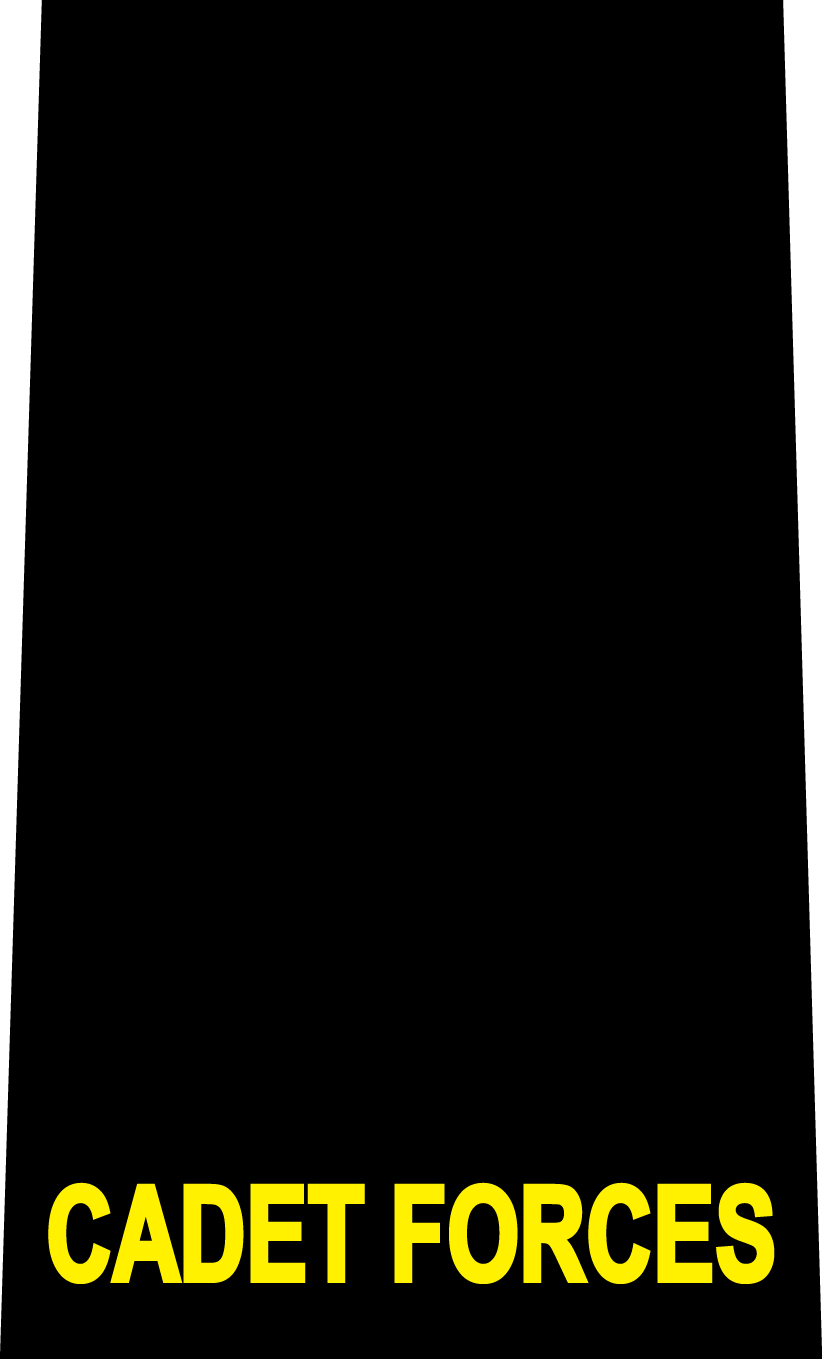
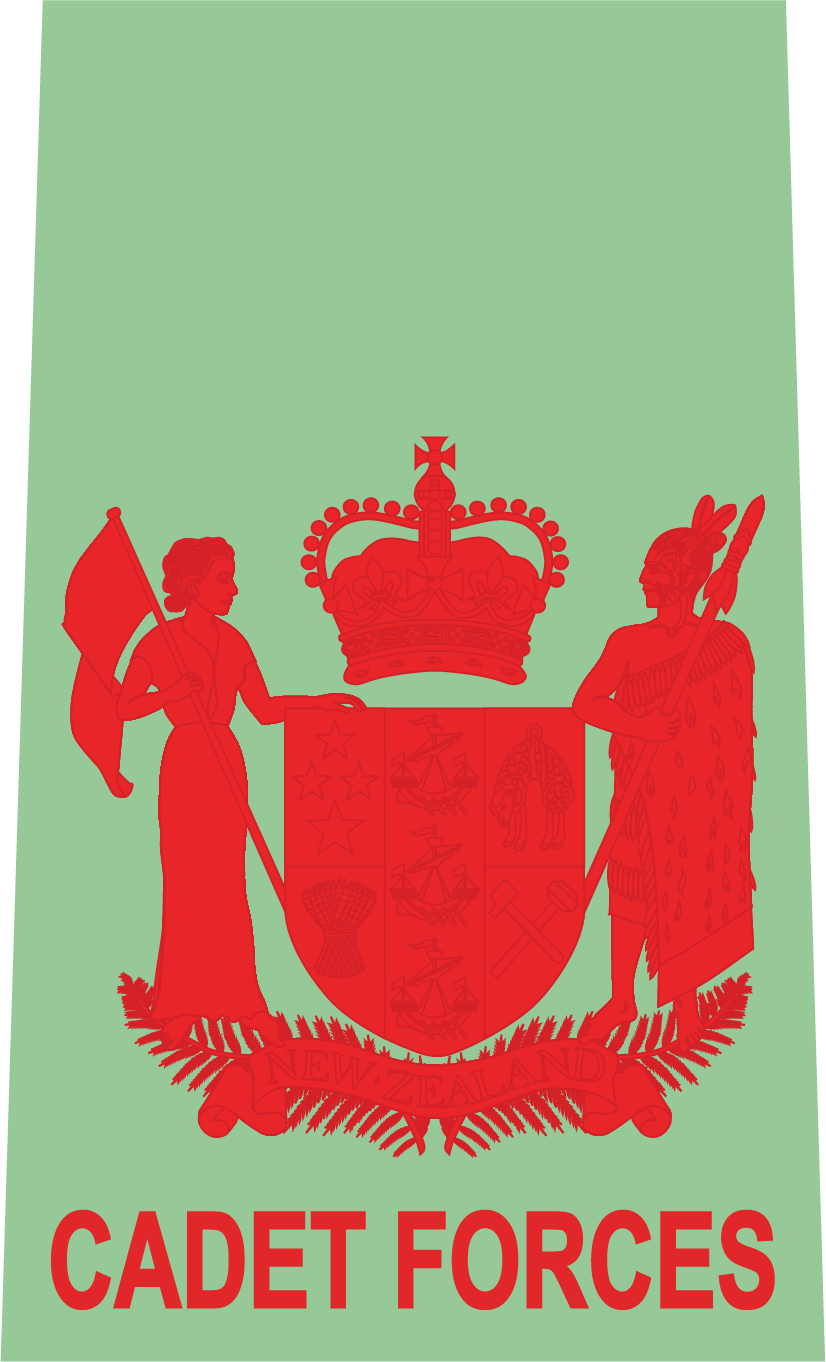
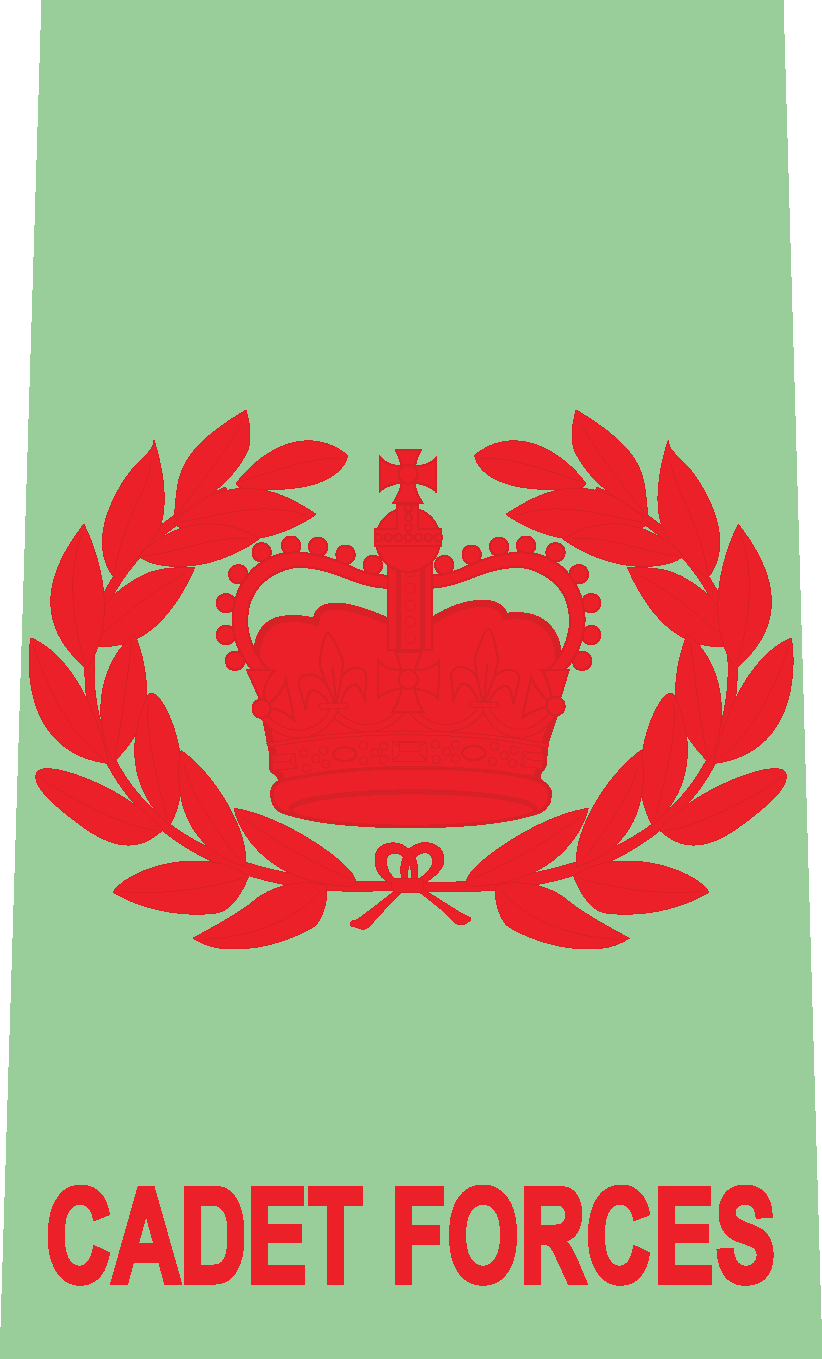
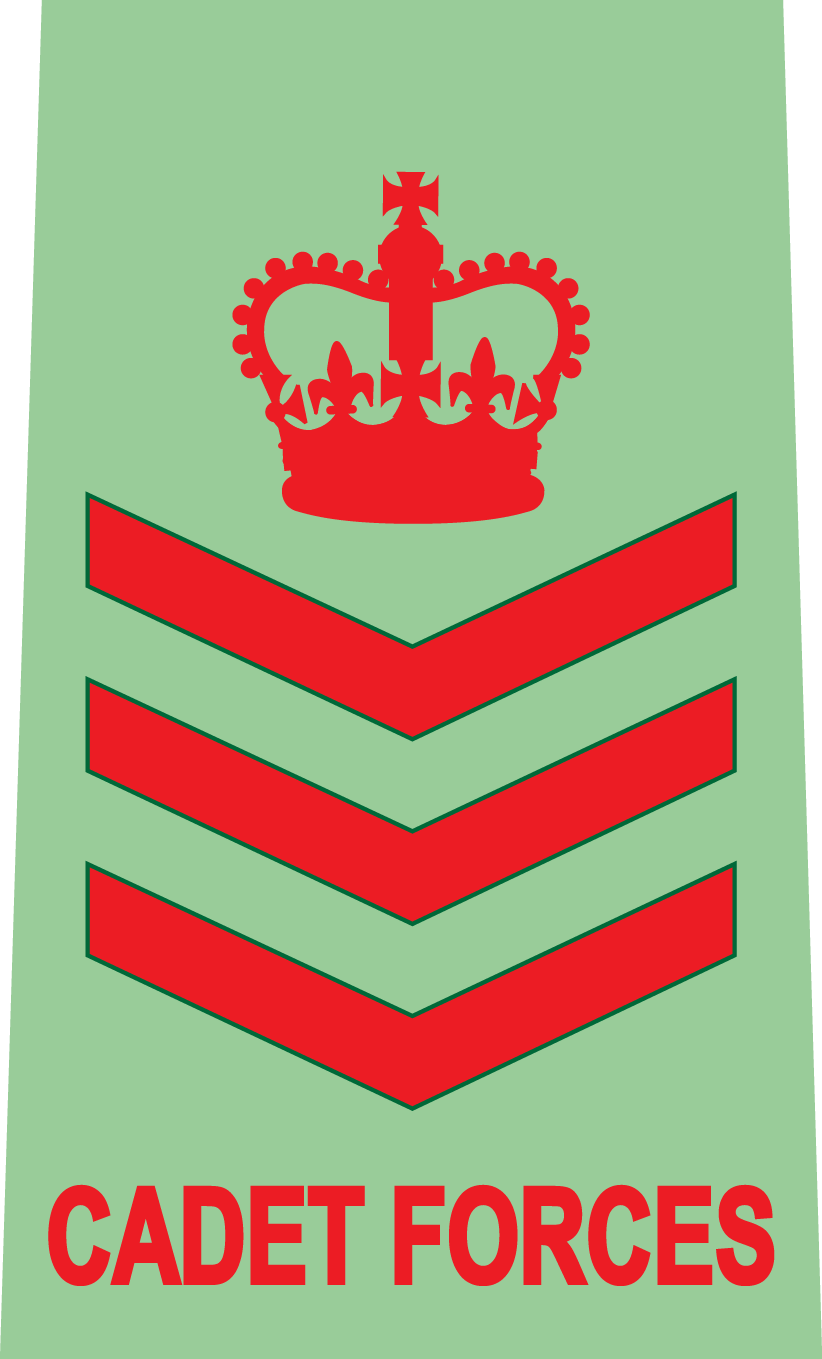
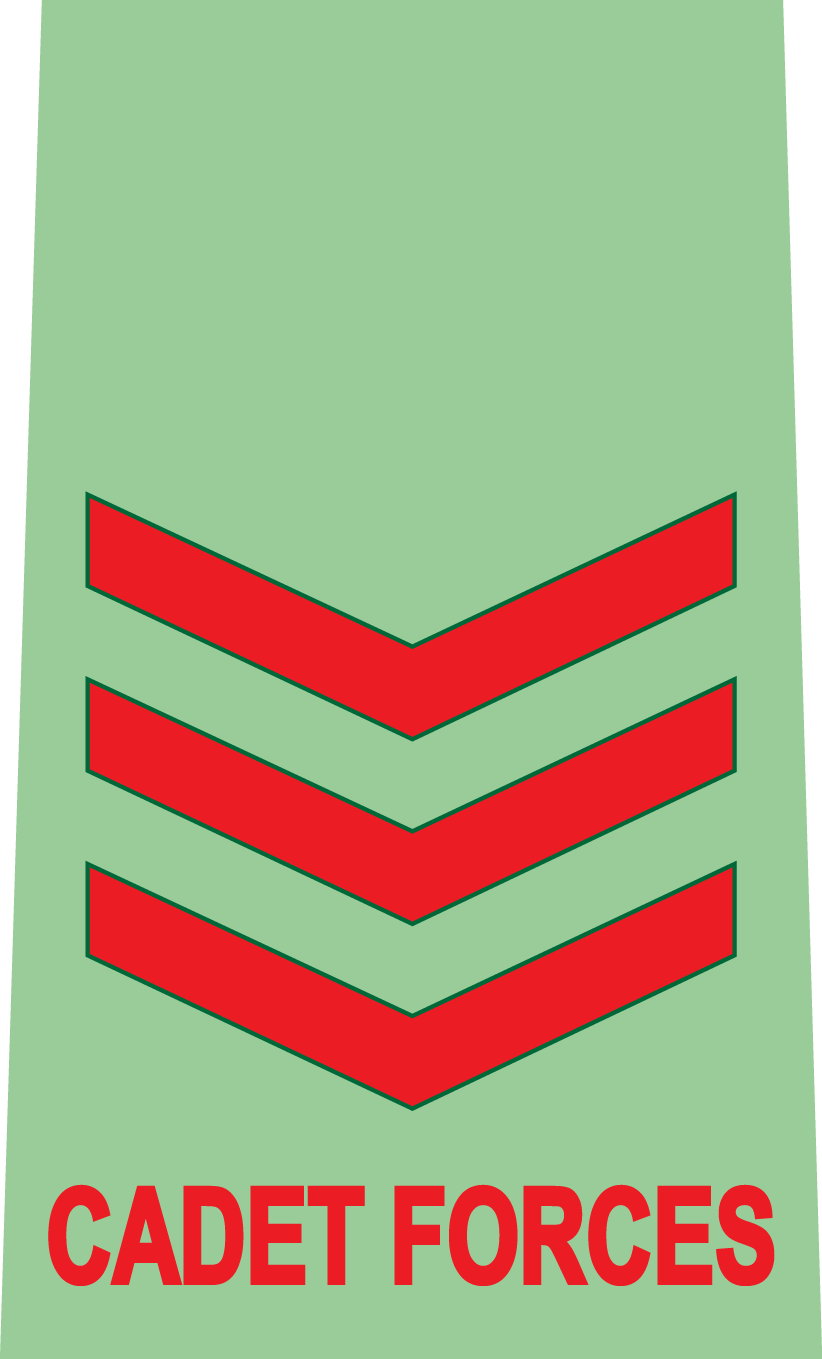
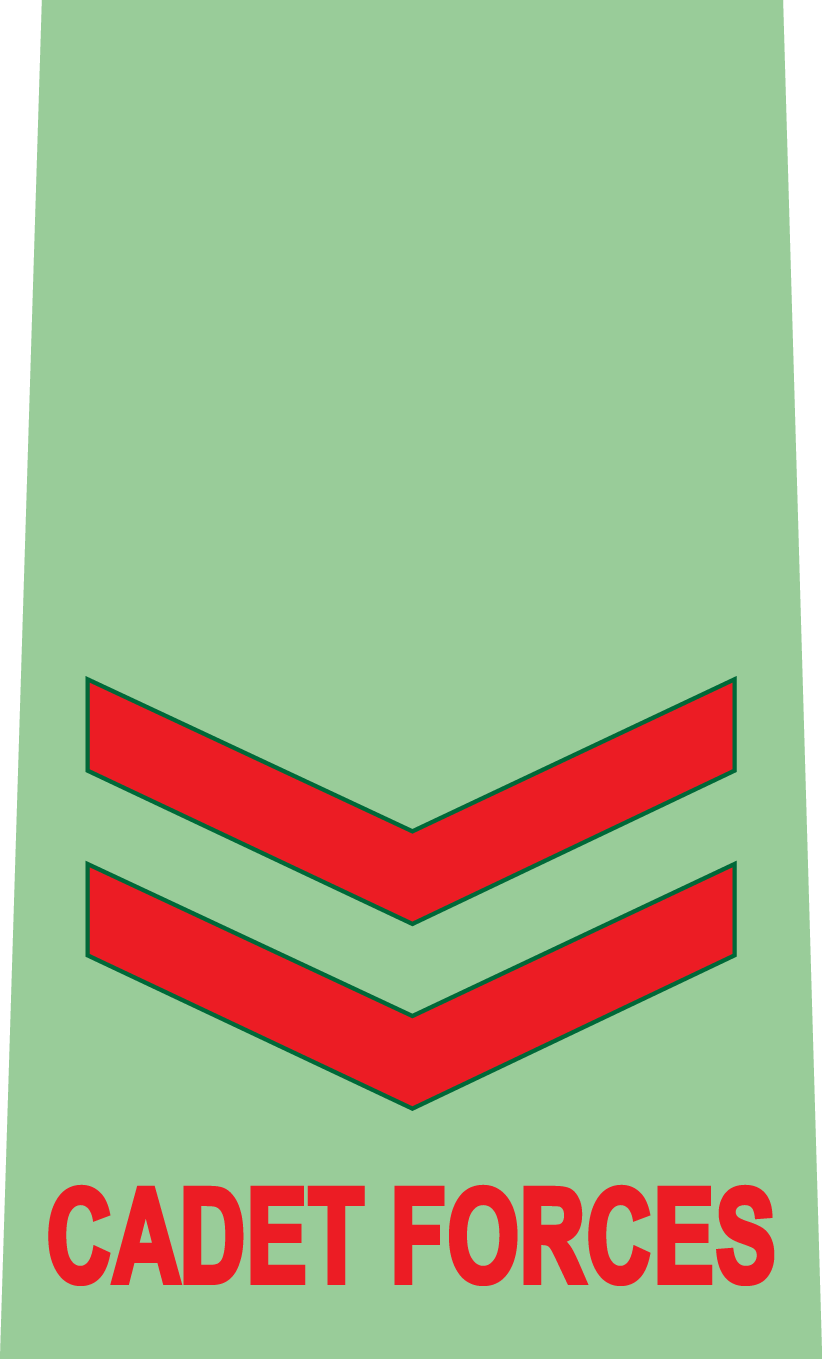
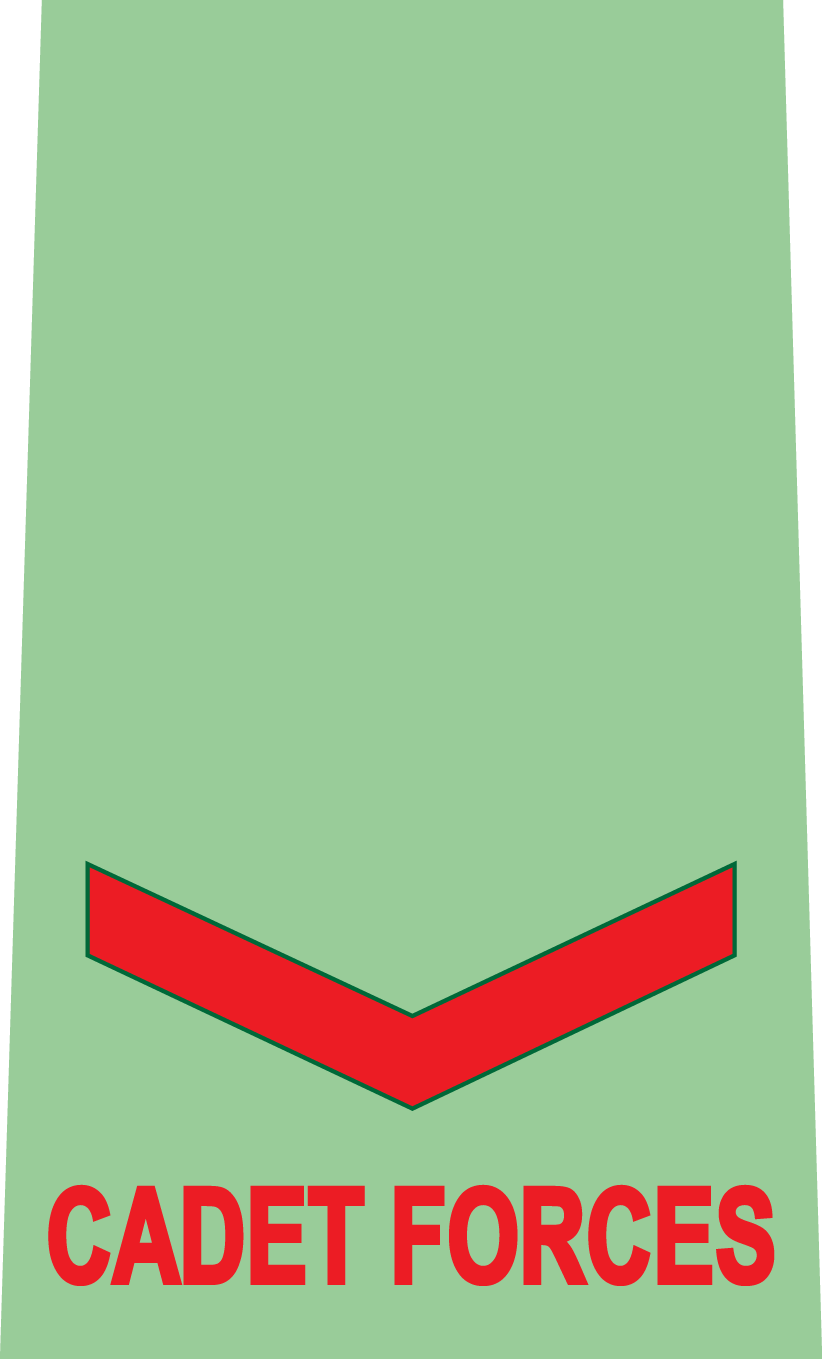
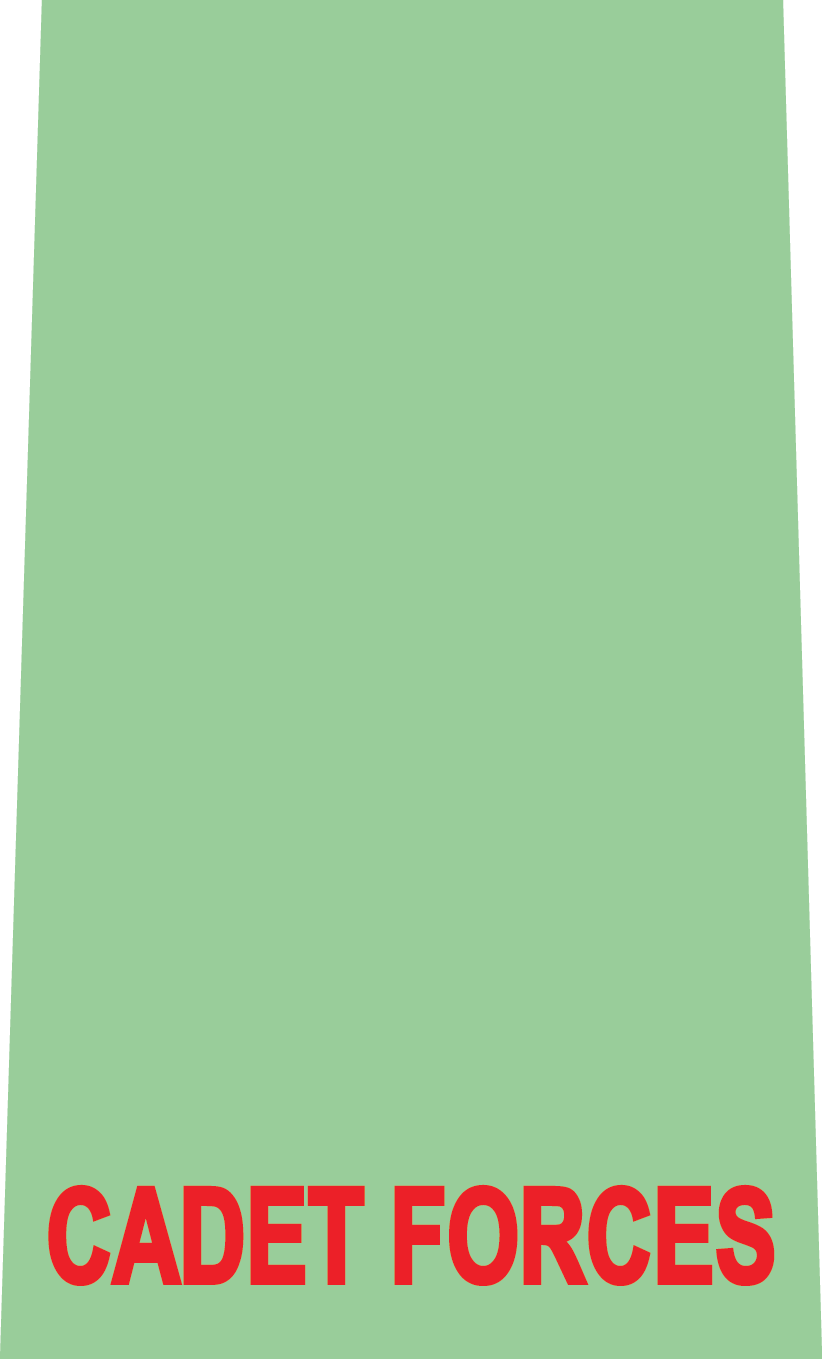
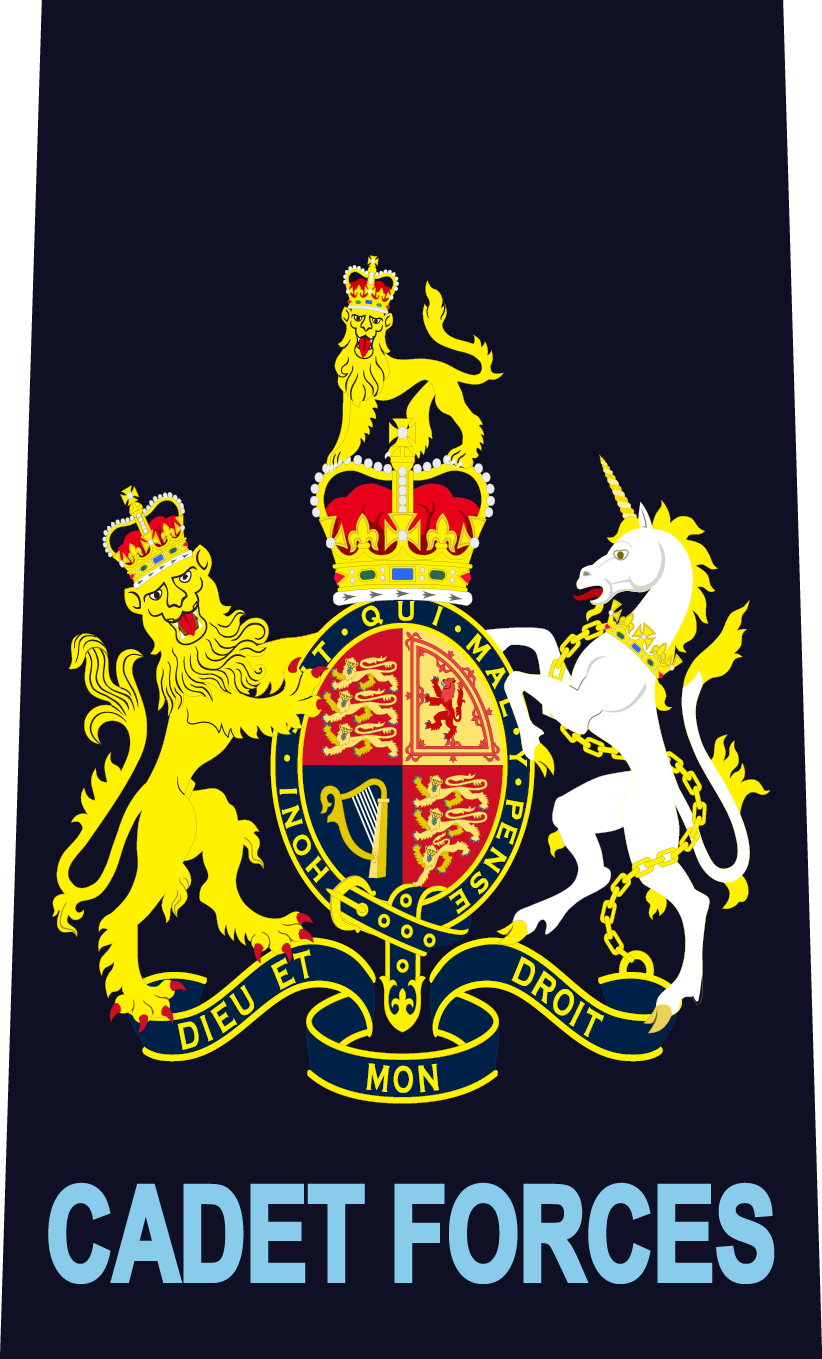
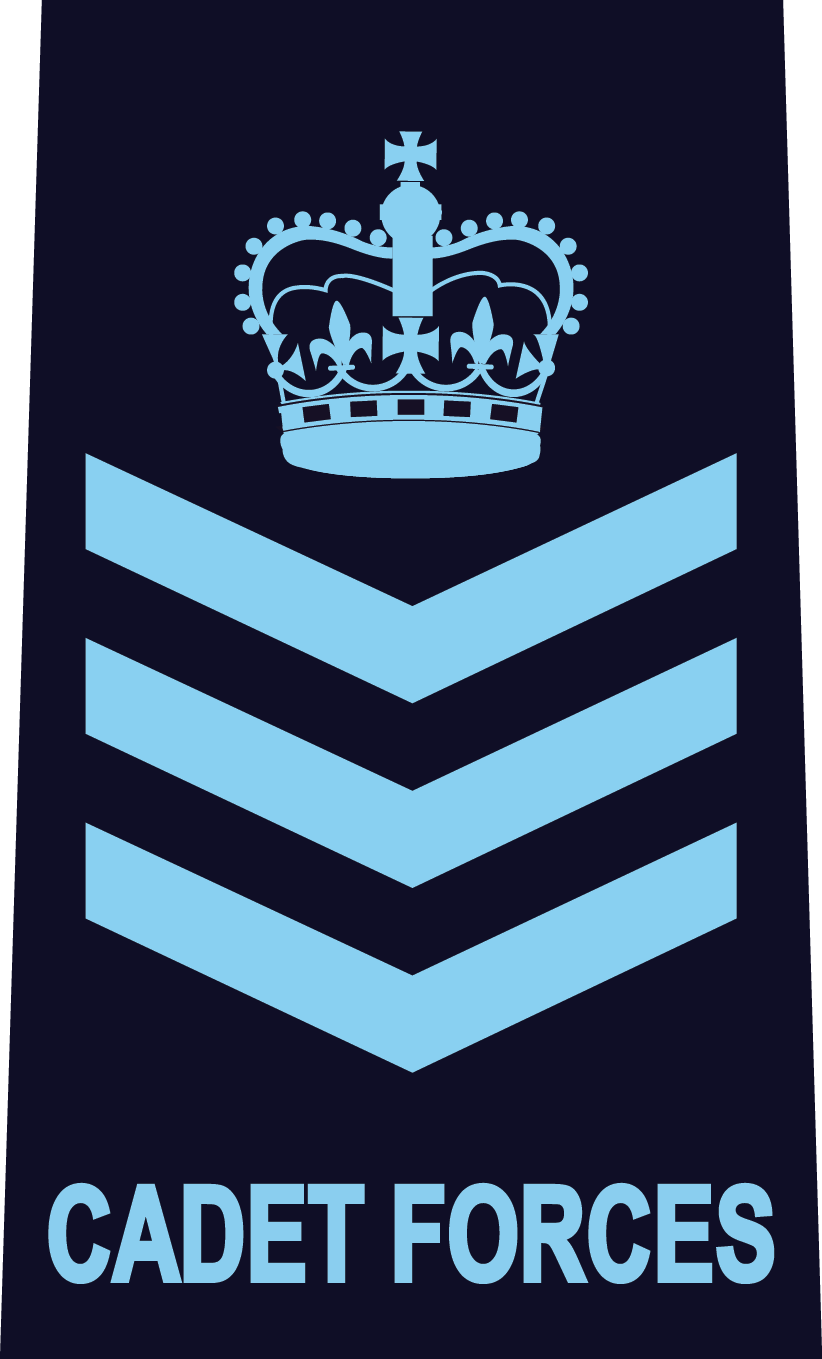
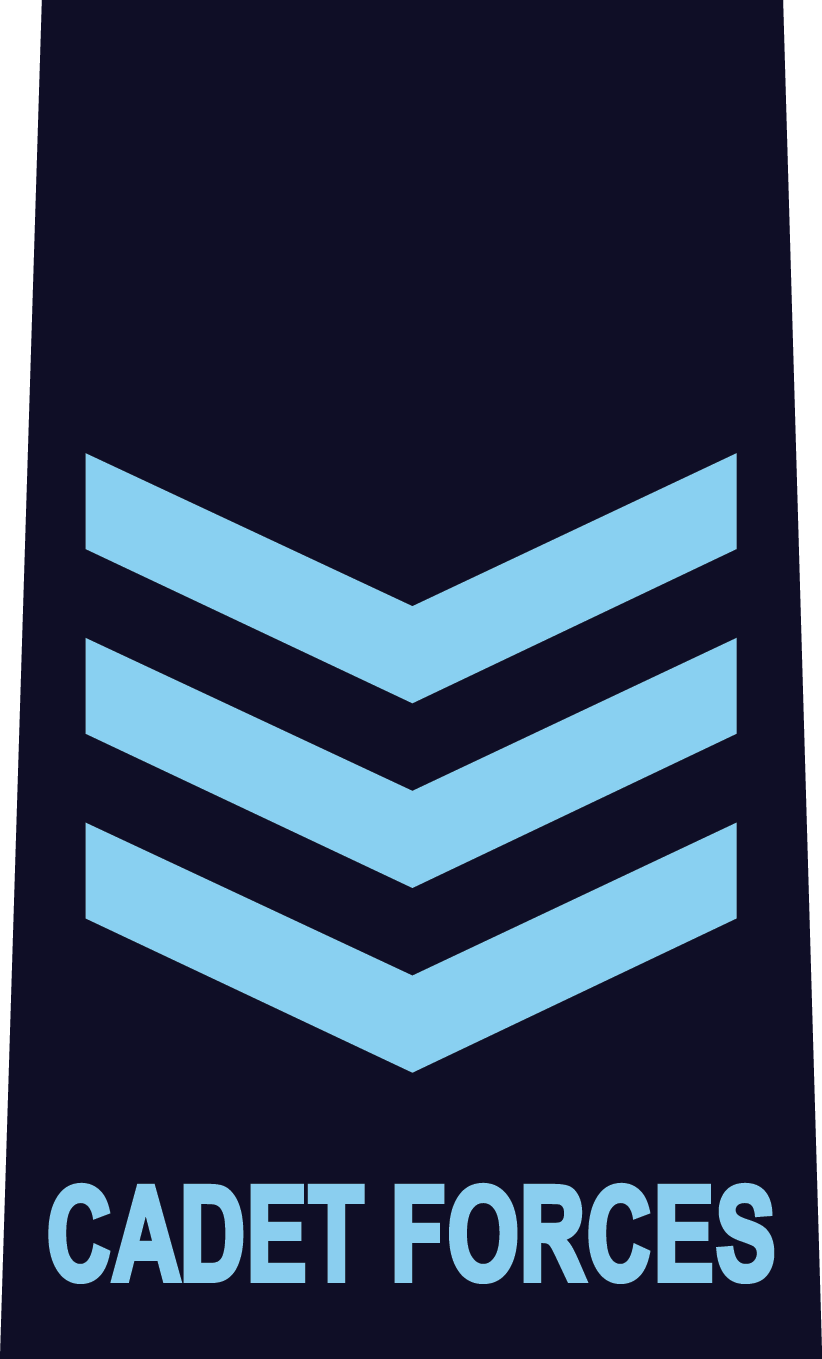
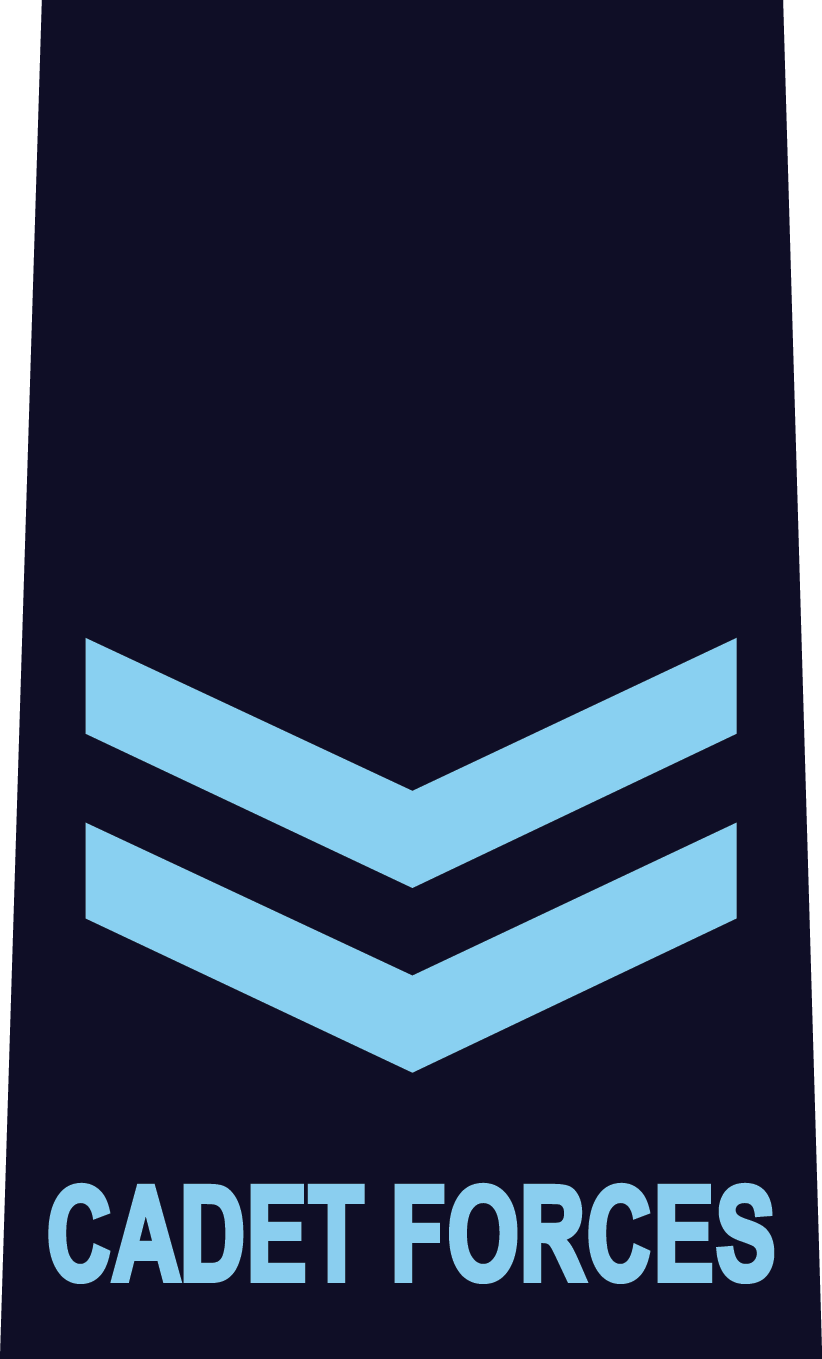
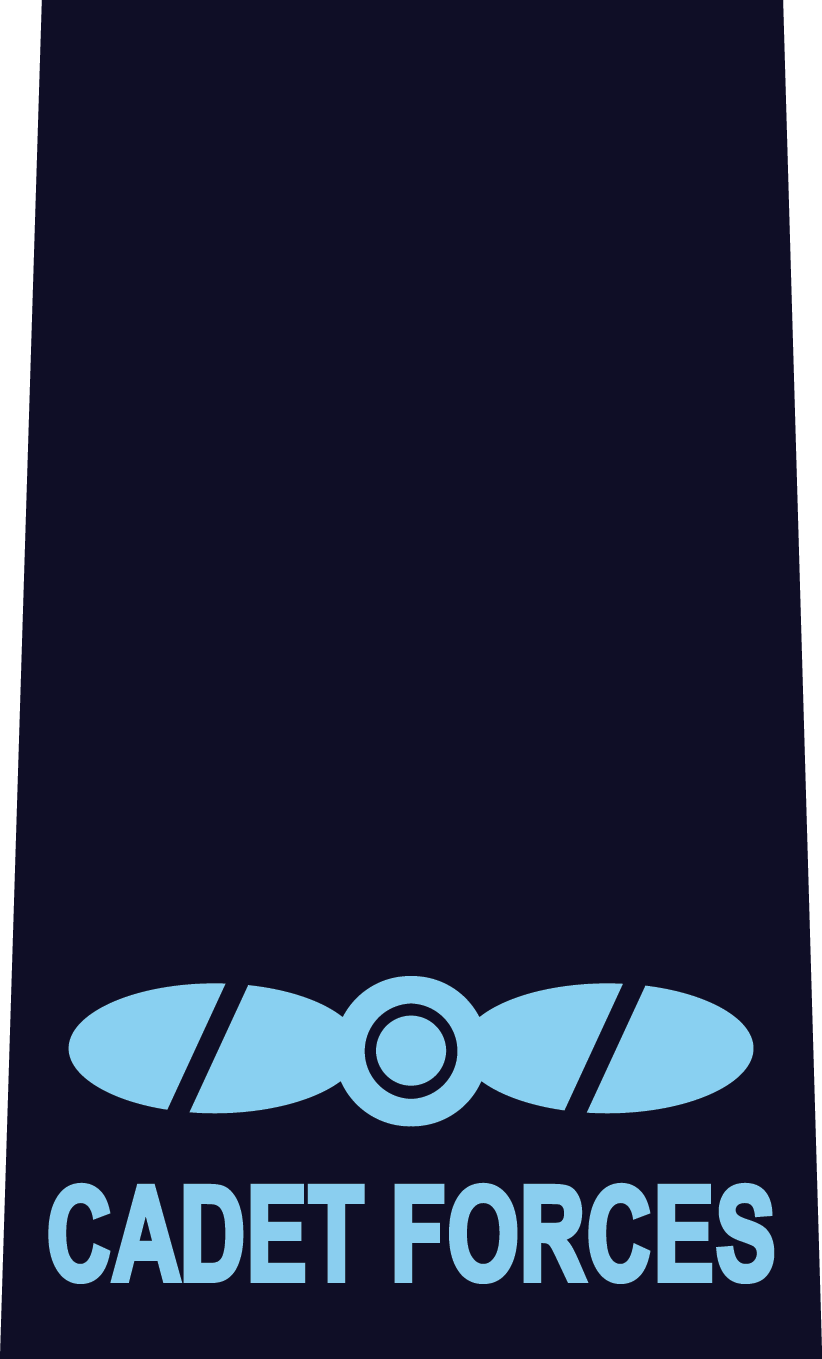
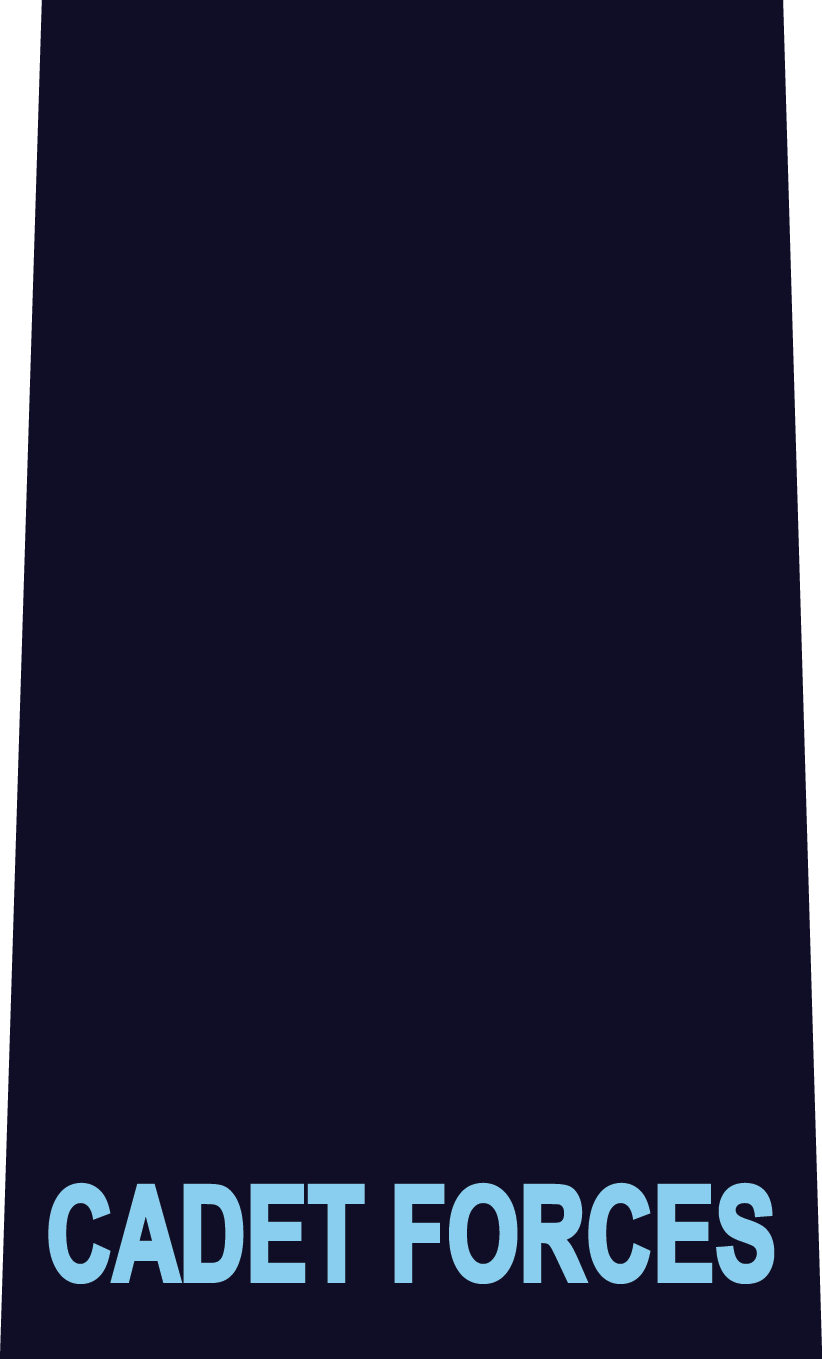
NZCF Cadets	CDT 7	CDT 6	CDT 5	CDT 4	CDT 3	CDT 2	CDT 1
New Zealand Sea Cadet Corps
New Zealand Sea Cadet Corps	Warrant Officer Cadet		Chief Petty Officer Cadet	Petty Officer Cadet	Leading Cadet	Able Cadet	Ordinary Cadet
New Zealand Sea Cadet Corps	WOCDT		CPOCDT	POCDT	LCDT	ACDT	OCDT
New Zealand Cadet Corps
New Zealand Cadet Corps	Cadet Warrant Officer Class 1	Cadet Warrant Officer Class 2	Cadet Staff Sergeant	Cadet Sergeant	Cadet Corporal	Cadet Lance Corporal	Cadet
New Zealand Cadet Corps	CDTWO1	CDTWOII	CDTSSGT	CDTSGT	CDTCPL	CDTLCPL	CDT
New Zealand Air Training Corps
New Zealand Air Training Corps	Cadet Warrant Officer		Cadet Flight Sergeant	Cadet Sergeant	Cadet Corporal	Leading Air Cadet	Cadet
New Zealand Air Training Corps	CDTW/O		CDTF/S	CDTSGT	CDTCPL	LAC	CDT

=== Former ranks ===
Type	Navy Cadets	Army Cadets	Air Cadets
Rank	Cadet Under Officer	Cadet Under Officer	Cadet Under Officer
Insignia			

=== Unit grading ===
Units are graded on their size, which dictates the number of Officers and Non-Commissioned Office each unit may possess. Units are able to deviate from the limitations of their grade, however must seek approval from the COMDT NZCF beforehand. Notably, the number of personnel used for the grading is based on the average attendance of weekly parade nights, as opposed to the total number of cadets enrolled at the unit. By 1 September each year, each Cadet Unit Commander is notified of their unit's grade.

Cadet Unit Grading Scale
Unit Grade	Officers	Supplementary Staff	CDTWO2(E)	CDTSSGT(E)	CDTSGT(E)	CDTCPL(E)	CDTLCPL(E)	Total Cadets
1	5	0-5	1	1	2	4	19	30
2	6	0-5	1	2	3	6	29	45
3	7	0-5	1	3	4	8	39	60
4	8	0-5	1	3	5	10	51	75
5	9	0-5	1	4	6	12	61	90
6	10	0-5	1	5	7	14	71	105

=== Under Officer rank ===
Consultation for the potential removal of the rank began in 2018 with the area Warrant Officers (WONA, WOCA, WOSA) talking to Under Officers and Warrant Officer's around the country to seek opinions regarding how Under Officers were utilised on a local level. Some NZCF Officers were also polled for an opinion. The result was that in 2019 HQ NZCF announced their intention to remove the under officer rank completely from service, to be replaced by the Officer Cadet rank. The Officer Cadet rank had traditionally been used for those attending a Commissioning Course to give personnel a shared rank and equalise personnel from the two different methods of commissioning (serving Under Officers and direct entry civilians). The rank of Officer Cadet is now given in its place to personnel intending to commission, regardless of if they previously served as a Non-commissioned Officer. This also gives direct entry candidates the opportunity to practice being in uniform and participate in unit parade nights before attending commissioning courses.

One of the more commonly used locations for the Under Officer course was the Royal New Zealand Police College, located in Porirua. This location presented the unique opportunity for NZCF students and staff to interact with the New Zealand Police and interact with their equipment. The last course held at the RNZPC was between 20 and 29 January 2017. The Last Under Officer Course was held at RNZAF Woodbourne between 6 and 15 July 2018.

As of April 2021 the last Under Officer graduated from the NZCF Officer Commissioning Course.

== Vision, mission, values and aims ==
Vision: Preparing New Zealand's successful leaders of tomorrow.

Mission: To develop and enable self-disciplined, confident and responsible young New Zealanders.

Core Values:

- Courage – Confronting challenges both physical and moral, to over come any adversity.
- Commitment – Being reliable and loyal, serving and supporting the NZCF, local communities and NZ.
- Comradeship – Looking out for each other, having respect for all, and championing the benefits of friendships, teamwork and diversity.
- Integrity – Having discipline, always being honest, trustworthy and responsible.

Aims:

- to foster a spirit of adventure and teamwork, and to develop those qualities of mind and body essential for good citizens and leaders.
- to provide challenging and disciplined training activities, which will be useful in either Service or civilian life.
- to promote an awareness of the Armed Forces, and the role they play in the community.

== Service eligibility ==
=== Cadet personnel ===
Any person between the ages of 13 and 15 years may join the NZCF. The full consent of parents or guardians is required to apply, and while under the age of 18 parental consent is required for all training and exercises undertaken. A person younger than 13 may join if presently attending Year 9 at a New Zealand Secondary School. Cadets can stay on without being promoted to the age of 18. Non-Commissioned Officers may serve until their 20th birthday at which time they must commit to serving as a commissioned officer, Supplementary Staff, or leave the unit.

All uniform is provided upon enrolment into a unit and completion of a training camp where wearing of the uniform is taught. Bonds are sometimes held to ensure that they are returned.

NZCF personnel are not subject to the Armed Forces Discipline Act 1971, and hence cannot be deployed into active service.

==== Fees ====
Unit fees are set by each unit Parent Support Committee annually. Due to fluctuating operating costs, these vary from unit to unit dependent on the type of activities the unit has planned, Participating in unit exercises may incur extra charges, although any costs outside of government funding are often subsidised by sponsors.

=== Adult personnel ===
==== Adult cadets ====
In 2017 the New Zealand Cadet Forces updated their Child Protection policy surrounding cadets who are either Non-Commissioned Officers or personnel who are completing cadet level training that are aged 18 and over.

There is a deliberate delineation between an 'Adult' and an 'Officer' as the latter has specific authority to exercise command and control over cadets and other NZCF Officers.

The key difference between a cadet who is an adult and a cadet who is under 18 is that adult cadets and indeed all adults within the New Zealand Cadet Forces are charged with the responsibility of maintaining the safety and welfare of cadets during all NZCF activities. While this does not mean that cadets who are classified as adults hold authority over other cadets due to their age, it means that adult cadets are expected to at the very least vocalise to an Officer or Supplementary Staff member when they believe safety and welfare have been compromised.

Cadet Non-Commissioned Officers who are 18 or older are issued a thin white band which is sewn into the rank slide of the individual immediately above the "CADET FORCES" lettering and below the rank emblem.

==== Officers and supplementary staff ====
Adult Members can serve in two capacities: Commissioned Officers or Supplementary Staff. Officers are commissioned into the New Zealand Cadet Forces, with the post-nominal letters NZCF, at the rank of Pilot Officer, and can be promoted to Flying Officer, and Flight Lieutenant after completing the necessary training and service. Cadet Force officers may serve to any age after receiving a commission.

In 2014 the organisation introduced a new position of National Support Officer (NSO). This position was designed to place a New Zealand Cadet Force Officer at high level of influence within HQNZCF, which traditionally had his position had been solely occupied by New Zealand Defence Force Personnel. In 2016 with the adoption of the continental staff system the position was renamed to Assistant Commandant. If he or she is an ATC officer, as opposed to an NZCC or SCC officer, they will hold the rank of Wing Commander.

Supplementary Staff or SS for short, are civilians who help train cadets. They do not wear uniform, but they are generally treated similarly to officers by cadets. Members of the NZDF are occasionally attached to cadet units to assist in conducting training. This is normally because they know a cadet/officer in that unit, or if they have a particular interest in cadet forces. They are addressed as "Instructor" or by cadets choice, "Sir" or "Ma'am".

==== Fees ====
NZCF Officers do not typically pay any membership fees for belonging to a Unit or Training Ship, this is typically to balance the time and effort put in by NZCF Officers. While Officers are not encouraged to, a large amount contribute anyway, by way of purchasing stationary and equipment for their unit.

== Courses ==
Each year the New Zealand Cadet Forces holds numerous courses designed to train and maintain the skills of all its personnel. Twice per year (Mid and late year) Headquarters, NZCF promulgates the NZCF Annual Training Programme or 'ATP', which represents the "Authorised Activities" that are undertaken by the NZCF. "Authorised Activities" are those which are at least partially funded by the New Zealand Defence Force and the support organisations for each branch (SCANZ/CCANZ/ATCANZ). Any other activity undertaken such as unit camps are "Recognised Activities" and receive no formal funding from the NZDF and are not included on the ATP.

Each course is staffed by a mix of Defence and Cadet Force personnel, with the bulk of staff being Cadet Forces Officers with Defence staff often performing logistics and support roles such as administrators. However, more enthusiastic personnel are often actively involved in the courses and provide an opportunity for cadets to ask questions regarding recruitment into the New Zealand Defence Force.

Tri-Corps promotional courses are held in each area up to three times per year (each school holidays excluding Christmas holidays) depending on requirements, with courses occasionally being removed if there are not enough applicants. Conversely, if a course in one area is removed then students from that area may be transported to and from another area (whichever has space on a course) for the student to undertake the course.

=== NZCF courses ===
==== Tri Corps courses ====
Tri Corps Courses are available to everybody in the New Zealand Cadet Forces regardless of which branch they are in.

Course Name	Description	Eligibility				Promotional
Course Name	Description	Cadets		Officers		Promotional
Course Name	Description	Student	Staff	Student	Staff	Promotional
Junior Non-Commissioned Officer (JNCO) Course	Equivalent of NZDF Junior NCO Course. Held at Tamaki Leadership Centre, RNZAF Base Auckland, Linton Military Camp, RNZAF Base Ohakea and Burnham Military Camp. Held three times per year in each area	Yes	Yes	No	Yes	Yes
Senior Non-Commissioned Officer (SNCO) Course	Equivalent of NZDF Senior NCO Course. Held at Tamaki Leadership Centre, RNZAF Base Auckland, Linton Military Camp, RNZAF Base Ohakea and Burnham Military Camp. Held two times per year in each area.	Yes	Yes	No	Yes	Yes
Cadet Fieldcraft Experience	Held at RNZAF Dip Flat, Tekapo Army Camp, or Waiouru Military Camp. Cadets learn long-distance navigation, tramping and camping skills. Held once per year in January.	Yes	Yes	No	Yes*	No
Shooting Coaches Course	Training for Senior NCOs (Sergeant/Petty Officer and above) and Officers in shooting coaching technique and the alternative shooting positions (Sitting and kneeling). Officers must attend this before being eligible for the Range Conducing Officer (RCO) course. Held 2–3 times per year, per area (same frequency as RCO course).	Yes	Yes	Yes	Yes*	No
Range Conducting Officer (RCO) Course	Required training for Officers to become Range Conducting Officer on unit range shoots. Officers who complete this as well as the Shooting Coaches Course are authorised to conduct NZCF Shooting using the alternative shooting positions (Sitting and kneeling). Held 2–3 times per year, per area (Same frequency as Shooting Course).	Yes	No	Yes	Yes*	No
Officer Commissioning Course	Training from which personnel become Commissioned into the New Zealand Cadet Forces as Officers. Graduates are give the rank of A/2LT(E) for their probationary period. Held twice per year in May and November at RNZAF Base Ohakea	No	No	Yes	Yes*	Yes
Instructional Technique and Training Management (ITTM) Course	Required training for commissioned NZCF officers in Instructional Technique and Training Management. Held twice per year in May and November at either RNZAF Base Ohakea or Burnham Army Camp.	No	No	Yes	Yes*	Yes
Command Course	Course required for any NZCF Officers who will be serving as a Cadet Unit Commander. Held annually at RNZAF Base Ohakea. Held once per year in September.	No	No	Yes*	Yes*	Yes
Officer Fieldcraft Course	For the training of commissioned NZCF officers. Successful candidates receive necessary credentials to lead unit expeditions and staff Cadet Fieldcraft Experience. Held once per year in January.	No	No	Yes	Yes*	No

*Personnel are required to undergo further training before being eligible to act in a staff role. This will always be passing the course as a student first.

==== Sea Cadet Corps courses ====
These courses and exercises are normally restricted to cadets in the Sea Cadet Corps. However, occasionally Officers from other branches will attend either as staff members or in order to cross train their skills. Officers that are stationed at multi-Corps Unit headquarters, such as TS Amokura (Wellington) which also has No. 1 (City of Wellington) Squadron, and Wellington City Cadet Unit parade from the same facility.

Course Name	Description	Eligibility			
Course Name	Description	Cadets		Officers	
Course Name	Description	Student	Staff	Student	Staff
Cadet Coxswain Course	5 day course held at Tamaki Leadership Centre. This course provides theory and practical instruction is provided in Sailing Skills, Coxswain & Crew Responsibilities and Emergency Procedures.	Yes	Yes	No	Yes
Sailing Regatta	Held every year, there is a regional competition between each area (Northern, Central, Southern) the victor of each regional competition then goes on to compete in the National Sailing Regatta.	Yes	Yes	Yes	Yes
Operation SEENAVY	A programme touring the Navy's base and craft.	Yes	No	Yes	No
Officer Marine Supervisor	A four-day course that gives Sea Cadet Officers the ability to operate cadet maritime activities safely.	No	No	Yes	Yes

==== New Zealand Cadet Corps ====
These courses and exercises are normally restricted to cadets in the New Zealand Cadet Corps. However, occasionally Officers from other branches will attend as staff members to help facilitate the activities.

Course Name	Description	Eligibility			
Course Name	Description	Cadets		Officers	
Course Name	Description	Student	Staff	Student	Staff
Regional Skills	A two-day event held every year at RNZAF Base Ohakea, Waiouru Military Camp, and RNZAF Base Burnham.	Yes	Yes	No	Yes
National NZCC Skills	A two-day event held at Waiouru Military Camp, between the three successful winning teams from NZCCSKILLS.	Yes	Yes*	No	Yes
Army Experience	Candidates choose a trade and are given a practical, four-day tour.	Yes	No	No	No
Cadet Bushcraft	Held at RNZAF Dip Flat, Tekapo Army Camp, or Waiouru Military Camp. Cadets learn long-distance navigation, tramping and camping skills. Held once per year in January.	Yes	Yes	No	Yes
Land Immersion	A six-day course held at Linton Military Camp. Cadets are immersed the world of the New Zealand Army.	Yes	No	No	No

*Provided students have been approved by their Unit Commander, and CFTSU. There is no guarantee for cadet staff.

==== Air Training Corps ====
These courses and exercises are normally restricted to cadets in the Air Training Corps. However, occasionally Officers from other branches will attend either as staff members or in order to cross train their skills. Officers that are stationed at multi-Corps Unit headquarters, such as TS Amokura (Wellington) which also has No. 1 (City of Wellington) Squadron, and Wellington City Cadet Unit parade from the same facility.

A recent addition to the list of courses on offer is an Officer Gliding Course, aiming to give New Zealand Cadet Force Officers, whose courses are normally paperwork based, the opportunity to have similar experiences to Cadets. A relatively small course in relation to the larger National Gliding Course, this course has proved extremely popular with ATC Officers.

Course Name	Description	Eligibility			
Course Name	Description	Cadets		Officers	
Course Name	Description	Student	Staff	Student	Staff
National Aviation Course – Power	One week course in which candidates study towards the FRTO section of the NZ CAA Private Pilot License exam and improve their powered flying skills in light aircraft. Students above the age of 16 have the opportunity to fly solo during the course and receive solo flight wings. Held each January at RNZAF Base Woodbourne.	Yes	No	No	Yes
National Aviation Course – Navigation	One week course in which candidates study the NZ CAA Private Pilot License syllabus in a practical environment and if successful receive a navigation brevet. Held each January at RNZAF Base Woodbourne.	Yes	No	No	Yes
National Gliding Course	One week course held each January at Matamata Aerodrome. This course gives students 1–2 days of theory behind glider aircraft. The remainder of the week is spent with several glider flights a day. *Note: this is the only course that has a weight limit (120 kg).	Yes	No	Yes	Yes
Air Force Experience	An opportunity to visit all three RNZAF Bases and learn about the work of the Air Force. Includes travel in a range of RNZAF aircraft. Replaces the more hands-on Live and Work course, in which candidates spent an actual week in the life of a chosen Air Force career.	Yes	No	No	No
National Aviation Skills	A two-day event held every year between the winning three teams from regional AVSKILLs competitions.	Yes	Yes	Yes	Yes

=== Staffing courses ===
==== Officers ====
All Commissioned Officers of the NZCF are eligible to staff both the JNCO and SNCO course by virtue of being commissioned. However precedence is given to Officers that have successfully completed the Instructional Technique and Training Management Course.

For promotional course there are several roles that an Officer can perform as a course staff member. Some Officers will be assigned multiple roles depending on their skill level and experience. The roles available to an Officer include, but are not limited to;

- Syndicate Leader – This will be the first position assigned to an Officer when they begin staffing courses. Directly responsible for a group of Cadets and their progress over the course. The Syndicate Leader will assess the students based on their performance and behaviour on the course. These personnel also provide the majority of the Duty of Care and in loco parentis on the course.
- Adjutant – Responsible for the administration and personnel of the course. This person will ensure all personnel attending receive their JI's (Joining Instructions) and will collate the nominal roll. Typically assigned to an Officer who has staffed courses previously and volunteers for the position. The individual holding this position will often double as a Syndicate Leader.
- Training Officer – Responsible for the creation and maintenance of the training programme for the course as well as ensuring lesson plans and instructors are adequate for the course. Typically assigned to an Officer who has staffed courses previously and volunteers for the position. The individual holding this position will often double as a Syndicate Leader.
- Course Director – The senior most Cadet Force Officer on the course. Ultimately responsible to the Area Office (CFTSU) for the successful running of the course. This position will only be given to an Officer that is trusted by the Area Coordinator or Senior Area Advisor and will almost always be CAPT/FLTLT/LT in rank and have staffed numerous courses previously. While on a course, if a student fails a terminal objective on the course (possibly resulting in them not passing the course) the Course Director will oversee the retraining and eventual retest of the student. This will normally be the only role that does not double as a Syndicate Leader.

==== Cadets ====
Cadets who graduate from the Senior Non-Commissioned Officer Course are eligible to go back and staff the JNCO course, the SNCO course, and the Cadet Fieldcraft Experience. These NCOs can staff in two capacities, depending on the course.

- Cadet Staff member – On promotional courses Cadet NCOs act as mentors and guides for junior cadets, displaying the behaviour and attitudes expected. Cadets are assigned in Platoon Sergeant/Division Lead/Flight Sergeant roles.
- Course Warrant Officer/Sergeant Major/Course Coxswain – A sub position for NCO Staff. This is the senior Cadet on the course, responsible for the rest of the Cadet Staff and the drill on course.
- Fatigue – Commonly referred to as "slushies", on promotional courses 2–4 Cadet NCOs are employed to help out in the kitchen and with logistics on the course such as setting up activity stands. These personnel will not typically interact with students in an educational capacity.

All Cadet Forces personnel that staff courses, regardless of rank and position are entitled to be paid for their work on course.

== Competitions ==
=== Shooting competitions and trophies ===
The David Culverwell Memorial Trophy for Top NZCF Shot

NZCF Top Shot by Year
Year	Recipient	Score	Unit
2020	SGT M. Fannin	86	13 SQN
2018	F/S S. Wells	91	19 SQN
2016	F/S C. Hobbs	94	19 SQN
2013	LAC T. Ngaro	86	41 SQN
2012	CDT K. Taylor	90	40 SQN
2011	F/S J. Tian	90	3 SQN
2004	F/S J. Kuriger	92	16 SQN

In 2004 Cadet Forces was approached, through Flight Lieutenant Bruce Sinclair, regarding the donation of a .22 competition rifle for use as a trophy by Mr Denis Culverwell. He wanted to donate the weapon as a trophy in memory of his son David who was tragically killed in a traffic accident. David was a very keen competition shot and his parents wanted to continue in this vein with the trophy. Northern Area had the trophy mounted and engraved and Headquarters verified it as being the trophy for the 'Top Shot' within Cadet Forces. The trophy is to be awarded annually to the highest scoring Cadet based on the annual .22 calibre shooting competition (Smit, Gunford or Wallingford). If two or more cadets have the same final score (regardless of unit) the COMDT has agreed to fund a shoot off. Using the same rules and conditions as the National shooting competitions the highest possible score (HPS) is 100.

Lady Islington Challenge Cup

Lady Islington Challenge Cup Winners
Year	Winning Unit	Area	Notes
2022	No. 3 (City of Auckland) Squadron	Northern	
2020	No. 13 (City of Napier) Squadron	Central	
2019	No. 3 (City of Auckland) Squadron	Northern	
2018	No. 3 (City of Auckland) Squadron	Northern	
2017	No. 19 (Auckland) Squadron	Northern	
2016	No. 19 (Auckland) Squadron	Northern	
2015	No. 3 (City of Auckland) Squadron	Northern	
2014	No. 19 (Auckland) Squadron	Northern	
2013	No. 19 (Auckland) Squadron	Northern	
2012	No. 7 (City of Hamilton) Squadron / No. 19 (Auckland) Squadron	Northern	Awarded 1st Equal
2011	No. 19 (Auckland) Squadron	Northern	
2010	No. 16 (District of Tauranga) Squadron	Northern	
2009	No. 36 (Greymouth) Squadron	Southern	
2008	No. 31 (Morrinsville) squadron	Northern	
2007	No. 16 (District of Tauranga) Squadron	Northern	
2006	No. 16 (District of Tauranga) Squadron	Northern	
2005	No. 16 (District of Tauranga) Squadron	Northern	
2004	No. 16 (District of Tauranga) Squadron	Northern	
2003	No. 16 (District of Tauranga) Squadron	Northern	
2002	No. 31 (Morrinsville) squadron	Northern	
2001	No. 16 (District of Tauranga) Squadron	Northern	
2000	No. 16 (District of Tauranga) Squadron	Northern	
1999	No. 16 (District of Tauranga) Squadron	Northern	
1999	No. 16 (District of Tauranga) Squadron	Northern	

Awarded to the NZCF team that attains the highest aggregate score in the annual .22 calibre shooting competition (Smit, Gunford or Wallingford).

Canterbury Defence Victory Trophy

Awarded to the Southern Area team that attains the highest aggregate score in the annual .22 calibre shooting competition (Smit, Gunford or Wallingford).

The K. & P.L. Bolton Rifle Shooting Trophy

Awarded to the Central Area team that attains the highest aggregate score in the annual .22 calibre shooting competition (Smit, Gunford or Wallingford).

Sir John Logan Campbell Vase

Awarded to the Northern Area team that attains the highest aggregate score in the annual .22 calibre shooting competition (Smit, Gunford or Wallingford).

=== Cadet unit efficiency awards ===
The National Efficiency Awards are as follows:

New Zealand Cadet Corps	The Rangatahi Trophy
Sea Cadet Corps	The Ex-Royal Navalmans Trophy
Air Training Corps	The Air League Trophy

Area Award for each Corps
Award names	Northern Area	Central Area	Southern Area
New Zealand Cadet Corps	Imperial Daughters of the Empire	The Riddiford Cup	Galloway Cup
Sea Cadet Corps	The Charles Palmer Cup	The HMNZS Gambia Shield	South Island Annual Efficiency Shield
Air Training Corps	The Web Shield	Central Area ATC Efficiency Trophy	Southern Area ATC Squadron Efficiency Trophy

Annually, Cadet Force units of the three corps compete for the most efficient unit. One unit from each of the three areas is nominated by the Area Coordinator. A senior officer from each of the single services or the respective corps NZCF Liaison Officer inspects the finalists using the NZCF 27, Unit Efficiency Form to select the national winner. All aspects of the unit's operation are considered including administration, training, stores and equipment, the atmosphere the unit displays, unit support committee and community support. The inspecting officer also officiates at the unit training parade.

All units of the New Zealand Cadet Forces are to be assessed for efficiency each year by their respective Area Coordinators. There are awards for the best unit in each area and a national award for the most outstanding Unit of each Corps in the New Zealand Cadet Forces.

=== Other competitions ===
Royal New Zealand Returned Services Association Community Service Award

The RNZRSA Community Services Trophy is awarded to the NZCF unit that is judged to have carried out the most worthy community service or project in the preceding year. The criteria for consideration is high, including the requirement that over 50% of the Unit's enrolled strength must be involved, that the project/activity must be intended to be continued in future years, and that the project/activity must be undertaken without remuneration. NZCF is a voluntary organisation for youth aged 13–18 years of age.

RNZRSA's Community Service Trophy
Year	Unit
2024	T.S. Amokura
2022	Ashburton Cadet Unit
2021	City of Porirua Cadet Unit
2019	TS Talisman
2018	No. 25 (District of Kaikohe) Squadron
2017	Ashburton Cadet Unit
2012	Opotiki College Cadet Unit

== Equipment ==
=== Firearms ===
Currently in use

- Marlin XT22
- Norinco JW-15a – Removed from service as a service rifle in 2011. Only in service as a non-functional drill purpose rifle.
- No. 8 Rifle – Removed from service as a service rifle in 2008. In service as a non-functional drill purpose rifle (some Southern Area units only).
- Drill Purpose Training Aid – Referred to as "DPTA's" there is a Mk I and Mk II variant. These serve as introductory platforms for Cadets to learn ceremonial drill.

Formerly used

- L1A1 Self Loading Rifle (SLR) – Used as a blank firing firearm on exercises and as a non-functional drill purpose rifle.
- .303 SMLE rifle – in 1912 issued to senior cadets with Pattern 1903 bayonet (Used up until 2021 for ceremonial purposes)
- .303 Bren gun
- Vickers MMG
- Sten gun
- .310 BSA Model D Air Rifle

=== Vehicles ===
The New Zealand Cadet Forces leases and operates a fleet of utility vehicles to enable cadet units to facilitate camps, exercises, and activities without always needing to hire vehicles. The NZCF have leased these vehicles long-term, they are based out of each area's (Northern, Central, Southern) training and support unit RNZAF Base Auckland, RNZAF Base Ohakea, Burnham Army Camp. Headquarters New Zealand Cadet Forces also retain a small number of vehicles that act as company vehicles for the use of senior NZCF staff such as the Commandant, NZCF and the Executive Officer.

Each vehicle is branded in an NZCF livery in order to promote brand awareness. The livery is based on New Zealand Defence Careers vehicles to promote synergy between the two.

The NZCF operates the following vehicles:

- Toyota Rav 4 SUV
- Mitsubishi Triton Ute
- Toyota Hiace Van

== Medals and awards ==
Cadet of the Year Award

Inaugurated in 2016, the Cadet of the Year Award (COTY) is an annual panel judged award received by one cadet who most exemplifies the NZCF values of Courage, Commitment, Comradeship and Integrity, during a calendar year. To be selected for judging by the panel a person must be nominated by another member of the NZCF, who must complete an NZCF 104 – COTY Nomination Form. Potential recipients must have demonstrated each of the values throughout the year and be recommended by their Cadet Unit Commander, who must complete submit a comment with the NZCF 104 form as to why the cadet deserves the award. Any cadet (CDTWO1(E) and below) can be nominated for the Cadet of the Year Award.

Initially a two-day competition held each October or September in each year, this version of the award was short lived due to the cost and lack of ability to travel for some personnel. With the active competition version of the award only occurring between 2016 – 2018.

The recipient is invited to the New Zealand Defence Force Person of the Year Awards to receive the award.

Cadet Of the Year Recipient
Year	Rank	Recipient	Unit/Assigned Posting	Notes
2024	Warrant Officer	O Evans	T.S. Waikato	
2023	Warrant Officer Class II	P.A Adams	City of Porirua Cadet Unit	
2022	Warrant Officer Class I	S Marwood	Warrant Officer Northern Area	
2021	Warrant Officer	H Cook	No.88 (Waimakariri District) Squadron	
2020	Warrant Officer	I Burr	No. 3 (Auckland City) Squadron	
2019	Warrant Officer	A Mulligan	No. 32 (Borough of Feilding) Squadron	
2018	Warrant Officer Class II	K McKee	Wellington City Cadet Unit	First year of NZCF 104
2017	Warrant Officer Class II	E Atkinson	City of Dunedin Cadet Unit	
2016	Warrant Officer	A Vallance	No. 17 (City of Christchurch) Squadron	Inaugural Year

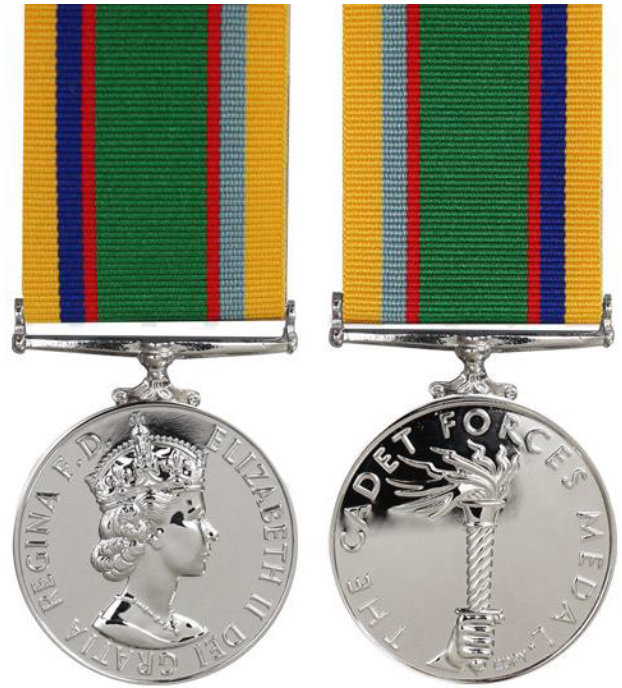
New Zealand Cadet Forces Medal

Cadet Force Medal Commissioned Officers are awarded the Cadet Forces Medal (CFM) after 12 years of continuous service from the age of 18 and choosing to become an Officer Cadet.

After each further eight years of continuous service, a clasp to the Cadet Forces Medal is awarded.

Personnel who receive this award typically hold the rank of Captain(E) due to the time in service required for the medal. However, it is possible for Officers holding junior ranks such as Second Lieutenant (Equivalent) to be awarded this medal.

Commandant's Commendation The 'COMDT NZCF Commendation' is available to NZCF personnel and Cadet Units whose contributions to the NZCF deserve formal recognition, but which may not meet the criteria for honours and awards from the Sovereign, or Chief of Defence Force/Service Chief/NZDF Commendations.

A Commandant's Commendation may be awarded to a member of the New Zealand Cadet Force for an act of gallantry, bravery or specific courage that, in the opinion of the Commandant, is worthy of recognition but does not merit a higher award. Alternatively the Commendation may be awarded for a singular accomplishment or extraordinary performance of duty over time.

Commandant's Coin Acting as an official 'challenge coin' of the New Zealand Cadet Forces. The Commandant's Coin is open to all individuals involved and associated with the New Zealand Cadet Forces. While not an award the coin is personal recognition to those who have provided valuable service to the NZCF; the service being above that normally expected. Recipients are at the discretion of the commandant.

New Year/Birthday Honours

While New Zealand Cadet Force members are not eligible for awards in the Military List of New Year or Birthday Honours. They are, however, eligible for awards in the Civil list

Recipients of Royal Honours
Year	Recipient	Honours Received	Honour List
2023	Gavin R A Nicol	Queen's Service Medal (QSM)	2023 New Years Honours
2022	Michael C Cole	Queen's Service Medal (QSM)	2022 Birthday Honours
2016	Bronwyn S Hanna	Queen's Service Medal (QSM)	2016 New Years Honours
2016	Trevor H Gibson	Queen's Service Medal (QSM)	2016 Birthday Honours
2014	Derek Beveridge	Queen's Service Medal (QSM)	2014 New Year Honours
2009	Wayne L Buckingham	Queen's Service Medal (QSM)	2009 New Years Honours
2008	Shane A Cole	Queen's Service Medal (QSM)	2008 Birthday Honours
2006	Sandra L Stonell	Queen's Service Medal (QSM)	2006 New Years Honours
1981	William G Costello	Member of the Most Excellent Order of the British Empire (MBE)	1981 Birthday Honours
1980	Courtney P Medland	Member of the Most Excellent Order of the British Empire (MBE)	1980 Birthday Honours
1979	Peter M Sanders, MBE	Officer of the Most Excellent Order of the British Empire (OBE)	1979 Birthday Honours
1978	Walter S A Waterston	Member of the Most Excellent Order of the British Empire (MBE)	1978 New Years Honours
1976	Denton N Tyler	Member of the Most Excellent Order of the British Empire (MBE)	1976 Birthday Honours
1975	Howard L Mallitte	British Empire Medal (BEM)	1975 New Years Honours
1974	Maurice J Lepper	Member of the Most Excellent Order of the British Empire (MBE)	1974 Birthday Honours
1973	William M Wheeler	Member of the Most Excellent Order of the British Empire (MBE)	1974 New Years Honours
1966	Frank Finnegan	Member of the Most Excellent Order of the British Empire (MBE)	1966 New Years Honours
1962	Bernard W J Brown, ED	Member of the Most Excellent Order of the British Empire (MBE)	1962 Birthday Honours

New Zealand Defence Force Chiefs Commendations

The New Zealand Chief of the Defence Force and single service Chiefs (Army/Navy/Air Force) make available Defence Commendation awards to New Zealand Cadet Forces personnel and units similarly to the Commandants Commendations.

Award	Eligibility/Description	Ribbon / Badge
Chief of Defence Commendation	The Chief of Defence Commendation is available to New Zealand Cadet Force personnel and Cadet Units whose contributions to the New Zealand Defence Force or New Zealand Cadet Forces deserve formal recognition, but which may not meet the criteria for honours and awards from the Sovereign.	
New Zealand Defence Force Commendation	The New Zealand Defence Force Commendation is available to New Zealand Cadet Force personnel and Cadet Units whose contributions to the New Zealand Defence Force or New Zealand Cadet Forces deserve formal recognition, but which may not meet the criteria for honours and awards from the Sovereign.	
Chief of Navy Commendation	The Chief of Navy Commendation is available to Sea Cadet Corps personnel and Cadet Units whose contributions to the Royal New Zealand Navy or Sea Cadet Corps deserve formal recognition, but which may not meet the criteria for honours or awards from the Sovereign.	
Chief of Army Commendation	The Chief of Army Commendation is available to New Zealand Cadet Corps personnel and Cadet Units whose contributions to the New Zealand Army or New Zealand Cadet Corps deserve formal recognition, but which may not meet the criteria for honours or awards from the Sovereign.	
Chief of Air Force Commendation	The Chief of Air Force Commendation is available to Air Training Corps personnel and Cadet Units whose contributions to the Royal New Zealand Air Force or Air Training Corps deserve formal recognition, but which may not meet the criteria for honours and awards from the Sovereign.	

== New Zealand Cadet Forces haka ==
i Ngā Toa Pōtiki o Aotearoa – the official Māori translation of The NZ Cadet Forces and the name of the New Zealand Cadet Forces Haka. In days gone past the term ‘Toa Pōtiki’ was used for the youngest warriors, those who were undergoing training. Toa muri was another term used to describe young warriors undergoing training.

Leader:	E Ngā Toa Pōtiki o Aotearoa - hai!	NZ Cadet Forces - right!
	Hīkina te waewae mauī	Pick the left foot up
	Whakatauhia ki te taha o te katau	and drive it in beside the right
	Teihana	Attention
	Kia rite, Kia rite	Stand prepared
	Ringaringa whakawhitia	Arms crossing
	Waewae takahia	Feet stamping
Leader:	E ngā toa muri	Oh young warriors
	Nō whea mai tātou	Where are we from?
Team:	Nō ngā hau / katoa/	From the four winds
	Ngā iwi o te ao/	Differing people
	E whai / ana i ngā ritenga toa/	Following the practices
	O Te Ope Kātua e	Of the NZDF
Leader:	Mā tēnā ka aha	What will that do?
Team:	Ka whakawhanake/	It will develop
	Te/ hinengaro/ te/ tinana/	The mind and body
	Hei whakawhena i ahau	So as make me resolute
Leader:	Me mahi tika, mahi pono!	Act with discipline and honesty
Team:	Whakapūmau i te hoa/	Be loyal to your friends
	I te tira matua/	And the group
	Whakamanahia te tangata	Respect others
	Mā reira e tū/ rangatira ai ko/e	Through that you will stand tall
	Me Ngā Toa/ Pōtiki o Aotearoa/	As will The NZ Cadets
	Te /whakawaiwai taiohi mō āpōpō	Training youth for tomorrow
	E / Hi!

== Government funding and pay ==
The Cadet Forces is partially funded through the Miscellaneous Support Activities (M22) appropriation in Vote Defence Force. This covers provision of the Defence infrastructure and planned support to regional defence forces and the New Zealand community. It includes the Mutual Assistance Programme, New Zealand Cadet Forces, Service Museums and assisting with the training of Limited Service Volunteers.

Pay

Excluding any Regular Force personnel, all service is voluntary and unpaid apart from commissioned officers and Cadet NCOs who are paid by the NZDF for staffing nationally organised (authorised) courses.

For Cadet Non-commissioned Officers and Second Lieutenant(E) this is flat rate equivalent to the New Zealand Minimum Wage at the time of the course multiplied by eight hours a day (a standard working day) for the length of the course. For Cadet NCOs this payrate is irrespective of rank, a Sergeant acting as a staff member will make the same as a Warrant Officer.

Commissioned Officers however are entitled to amounts commensurate with their ranks. Senior Cadet Force Officers such, Major(E) are entitled to a higher rate of approximately $340 per day for the length of the course (not including travel days).

Staff members are also entitled to monetary compensation in the form of reimbursement for travel expenses to and from courses, however advantage is of the special relationships the New Zealand Defence has with national carriers, notably Air New Zealand, both aviation and bus transport is utilised for personnel movements when feasible. The New Zealand Defence Force also offer transport using RNZAF aircraft as long as it does not affect operational requirements.

In June 2021 the New Zealand Chief of Defence Force approved an 'annual gratuity payment' to Commissioned New Zealand Cadet Force Officers. Officers who logged enough hours in 2020 received a "good faith" payment from the New Zealand Defence Force. And moving forward from 2021 a criterion has been set for each NZCF Officer that will need to be met annually in order for the payment to be made;

- Must be a Commissioned Officer of the New Zealand Cadet Forces
- Not under probation or suspension
- Accumulate 20 days minimum NZCF service each calendar year
- Must have a completed an annular PDR (Performance Development Review)
- The rate is paid at the rank held for the majority of the year.

== Legal standing ==
The New Zealand Cadet Forces (NZCF) are established and maintained under Part 6, Section 74 of the Defence Act 1990. This legally empowers the Minister of Defence to raise and maintain cadet forces: the Sea Cadet Corps (SCC), the New Zealand Cadet Corps (NZCC), and the Air Training Corps (ATC).

Sub section 1A of Part 6, Section 74, of the Defence Act 1990 delegates and empowers the Chief of the Defence Force (CDF) to maintain the NZCF. The NZCF is not, however, a component of the New Zealand Defence Force. Aspects of the CDF delegation are then sub-delegated to the Commandant NZCF who is responsible for the strategic direction and operational functioning of the organisation.

== Controversies ==
Temporary Order No. 3 Controversy

In November 2011 Temporary Order no. 3 (Temporary orders are numbered as they are released annually, i.e. Temporary order 3 was the third released in 2011) was released by HQNZCF detailing sweeping changes in the eligibility of cadets and to what age they were able to serve until. The Temporary order, which was eventually scribed into the NZCF Policy and Administration Manual (PAM), restricted all cadets over the age 18 from serving unless they were promoted to the rank of Under Officer (disestablished and replaced by Officer Cadet). This was highly controversial for members of the organisation and resulted in many Senior Non-Commissioned Officers leaving the organisation, creating a power vacuum that resulted in junior cadets being thrust into higher ranks without the necessary experience and training. There is speculation as to exactly what prompted the creation of this Temporary Order, however there has not been a public statement given that confirms any theory. In the aftermath a NZCF Officer was asked to formally resign for breach of the Code of Conduct of the New Zealand Cadet Forces, which states that no member of the organisation may bring it in to disrepute.

Adventurous Training

In July 2010 HQ NZCF issued a memo that clarified to Cadet Unit Commanders and NZCF Officers that "Adventurous Activities" were overwhelmingly not permitted by NZCF personnel and activities paintball, skydiving, and paragliding were explicitly restricted. This persisted until November 2016 when Temporary Order T2/2016 was released once again allowing NZCF units to oragnise and participate in the aforementioned activities provided the appropriate planning was completed and approved by Area Offices (Cadet Force Training and Support Units). Resultingly activities such as paintball and skydiving are recognised activities within the boundaries of the New Zealand Cadet Forces.

=== Gliding incidents ===
December 1997

On 9 December 1997 a fatal incident occurred on a Cadet Gliding Course that resulted in the deaths of a 16 year old from Upper Hutt and an English born doctor that moved to the local area from Canada in 1994. At 4:12pm the glider entered into a stall, before nose diving towards the ground, disintegrating in the process. Cadets on the course were witness to the event.

January 2009

On 31 January 2009 an incident at Central Hawkes Bay Aeroclub, located in Waipukurau, occurred that resulted in minor injuries for a cadet and an instructor. The glider made an unexpectedly low approach and when the instructor made evasive maneuvers the right wing of the glider has struck a power line resulting in a crash. Both the cadet and instructor survived with no serious injuries, with the cadet continuing on to complete the camp.

April 2009

On 30 April 2009 a second gliding related incident occurred on the National Gliding Course. Minutes after takeoff a glider carrying a 14 year old cadet from Christchurch and a 77 year old instructor from Taupō, suffered an event which resulted in the glider aircraft crashing into the ground. The instructor in the back suffered from moderate back injuries and had both ankles broken, the cadet however, was taken by rescue helicopter to Waikato Hospital in critical but stable condition. The cadet suffered from a spinal injury and was required to use a wheel chair and walking frame for some time. By June 2019 the cadet was back parading with his unit in Christchurch.

=== Firearms incidents ===
Theft of Cadet Rifles

In July 2015 Taupo Cadet Unit was burgled, resulting in the loss of 6 Marlin XT rifles and 4 drill purpose Norinco JW-15a rifles.

Negligent Discharge

On 17 September 2020 an incident occurred that resulted in the discharge of a personal firearm at a cadet training facility. The incident occurred on the grounds of Timaru Christian School, however the facility involved was not part of the school. The incident was during firearms training, with the instructor involved bringing in eight personal firearms to demonstrate to cadets the evolution of firearms. The incident was investigated by the New Zealand Police and the HQ NZCF. The instructor received a warning from the NZ Police.

== Notable New Zealand cadets ==
Name	Notability	Corps/Unit
Sir Peter Blake	Won the 1989–1990 Whitbread Round the World Race, held the Jules Verne Trophy from 1994 to 1997, led New Zealand to successive victories in the America's Cup.	SCC / TS Leander
Bernard Freyberg, 1st Baron Freyberg	New Zealand soldier and Victoria Cross recipient, who served as the 7th Governor-General of New Zealand from 1946 to 1952.	Wellington College Defence Cadets
George Augustus King	New Zealander who served in the New Zealand Military Forces during the First World War.	Cadet Corps
Keith Caldwell	Fighter Ace of the Royal Flying Corps and Air Commodore of the RNZAF during WWII.	Defence Cadet Corps
Ray Hanna	Served in the RAF, founding member of the Red Arrows aerobatics display team.	ATC / No. 19 Squadron
Kenneth Hayr	Served in the RAF as Deputy Strike Command.	ATC / No. 3 Squadron
Ben Pryor	Served in the RNZAF, recipient of the RNZAF Gallantry award for bravery while serving in Afghanistan as part of ISAF.	ATC / No. 19 Squadron
Trevor Bland	Served in the RNZAF flying Vampires, later he was a high-profile aerobatics pilot and founded the New Zealand Warbirds Association.	ATC / No. 19 Squadron

== See also ==
- Cadets (youth program)

New Zealand Youth Organisations

- New Zealand Cadet Corps
- Air Training Corps
- Sea Cadet Corps
- Scouts New Zealand
- Girl Guides New Zealand

== Bibliography ==
Cadet Force Orders	List of NZCF Manuals	Relevant NZDF Manuals
Cadet Force Order 0 – Command.; Cadet Force Order 1 – Personnel.; Cadet Force Order 2 – Security, Organisational Information and History.; Cadet Force Order 3 – Cadet Operations.; Cadet Force Order 4 – Logistics and Equipment.; Cadet Force Order 5 – Planning and Reporting.; Cadet Force Order 6 – Communications and Information Systems.; Cadet Force Order 7 – Training and Education.; Cadet Force Order 8 – Assurance and Inspector General.; Cadet Force Order 9 – Finance and Civic Liaison.; Cadet Force Order 10 – Guides.	'Policy and Administration Manual. New Zealand Cadet Forces. 1996.'; NZCF 142 - Aviation Studies Manual; NZCF 150 - Instructional Technique Manual; NZCF 151 - Firearms Training Manual; NZCF 152 - Tri Service SLR Drill Manual (redundant); NZCF 153 - Leadership Manual; NZCF 157 - 5 Year Training Programme (redundant); NZCF 158 - Navigation Manual; NZCF 159 - RATEL Manual; NZCF 160 - Competitions and Awards Manual; NZCF 161 - Risk Management Manual; NZCF 163 - Health and Safety Manual; NZCF 164 - Equal Employment Opportunities and Anti-Harassment Advisor Manual; NZCF 165 - Life Skills Manual; NZCF 166 - New Zealand Cadet Forces Drill Manual; NZCF 167 - CFK and GSK Manual; NZCF 170C - Cadet Development Framework; NZCF 170O - Officer Development Framework	NZAP 818 - Manual of Drill and Ceremonial (RNZAF) - Superseded by NZAP 2.4; NZAP 2.4 - Manual of Ceremonial and Drill; NZAP 207 - RNZAF Dress Instructions; NZ P6 - Drill Manual (NZ Army); BR 1834 Royal Navy Ceremonial and Drill Manual
