= New Zealand Sea Cadet Corps =

- Active: 1929–present
- Country: New Zealand
- Allegiance: HM The King
- Branch: Navy
- Type: Volunteer Youth Organisation
- Size: 16 Training Ships
- Part of: New Zealand Cadet Forces
- Headquarters: Trentham Military Camp
- Nicknames: Navy Cadets; Squiddies
- Mottos: Ready, aye ready.
- Boats Operated: Crown; RS Feva; RS Venture
- Website: www.cadetforces.org.nz

Commanders
- Minister of Defence: Hon Judith Collins
- Chief of Defence Force: Air Marshal Tony Davies, RNZAF
- Commandant NZCF: Wing Commander Bruce Creedy, RNZAF
- Executive Officer NZCF: Squadron Leader Bruce Sinclair, RNZAF
- Assistant Commandant: Wing Commander Shane Cole, NZBM QSM NZCF
- Warrant Officer Cadet Forces: Warrant Officer Cadet Alexandria Waugh

Insignia
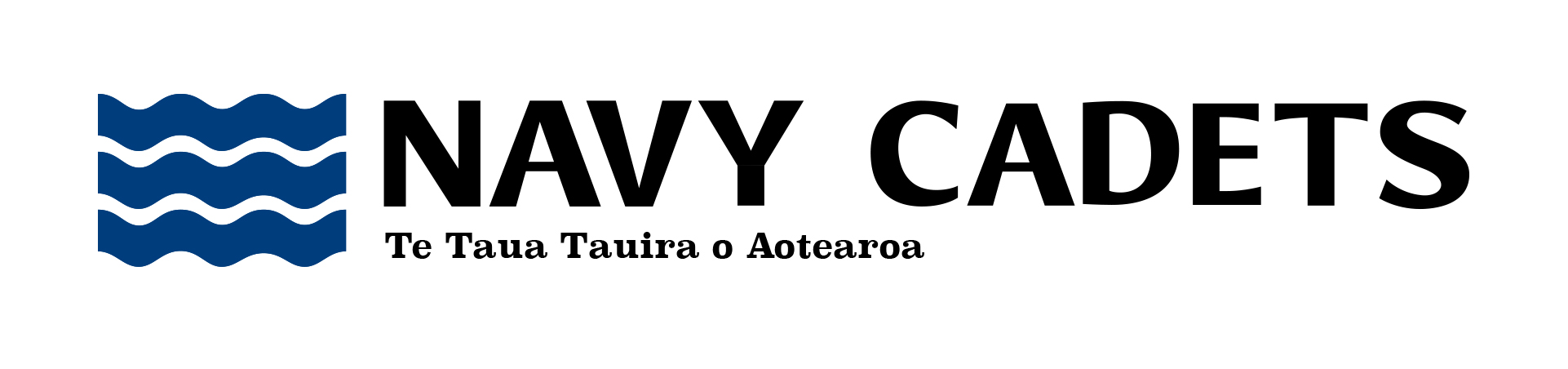
- Logo

The New Zealand Sea Cadet Corps (also known as Navy Cadets, SCC, and Sea Cadets) is one of the three corps in the New Zealand Cadet Forces, the other two being the Air Training Corps, and New Zealand Cadet Corps. It is a military-style training organisation for young people between the ages of 13 and 21. Activities include sailing and boat work, ropework, shooting and drill, amongst other activities, many of which involving the other branches of the NZCF. Cadets need to pass an annual swimming test to undertake water-based activities.

== History ==
=== Foundation and early years ===
The sea cadet corps was first proposed on 18 February 1926 during the Navy League Conference. The proposal highlighted the need for a naval reserve for men over the age of 18 and the institution of a sea cadet corps for youths under that age. The proposal was that every major seaside centre in the dominion should have naval reserves whose numbers were fed by the sea cadet corps upon graduation of training. The proposal was tabled again at the 1928 Navy League Conference

Ultimately it was not until 1929 that the first sea cadet corps company (Originally named "The Navy League Sea Cadet Corps") was formed by Colonel Vere Staunton Smyth, formerly of the Royal Warwickshire Regiment, and who served in the First World War with the New Zealand Rifle Brigade (Earl of Liverpool's Own). Enrolment began on 16 October 1929 and after only a month had a strength of 65

By July 1930 the company had grown in numbers to 73 although the boys in the early sea cadet corps sometimes struggled to find funding for the uniform, which they had to purchase individually. In 1932 the sea cadets were noted to be underequipped by Colonel Smyth, "He mentioned the handicap under which the corps laboured in the lack of proper equipment, including a ships compass, signal flags, morse keys, and books". May 1932 saw the first two whalers' acquired from the admiralty.

By the mid-1930s the still exclusively Christchurch based sea cadet corps had flourished with regular camps being held at Ripapa Island, Quail Island, Port levy and the greater Lyttelton area. withcadets demonstrating semaphore and morse code usage. From 1937 command of the company transferred to Lieutenant Commander R. C. E Harding, who was tasked with increasing the strength of the corps to 100.

The formation of a second sea cadet corps unit in Dunedin was proposed in May 1938 and by the end of the year the unit had been formed

=== 1940s and World War II ===
A meeting in May 1940 established a central office for the Sea Cadet Corps which at the time included the two units based in Christchurch and Dunedin. The purpose of this office was to gain more formalised assistance from the Naval Authorities. This office was established in Christchurch user the auspices of the Canterbury branch of the Navy League.

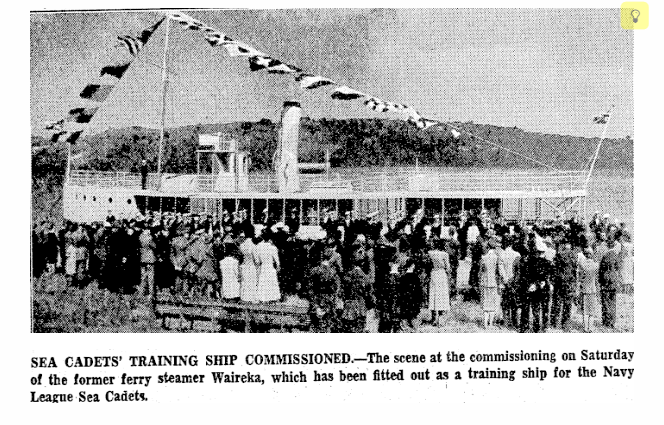

In 1941 the corps expanded again with a Wellington-based unit being established and absorbing the Collingwood Sea Scouts. April of the same year saw the first two sailors of the sea cadet corps join the Royal Navy.

On Saturday 7 November 1942 the Training Ship Waireka was commissioned by Commander F. G. McDonald, R.N.R. The training ship, permanently moored in harbour was used throughout the war to provide practical training to cadets.

During the war the sea cadet corps contributed to New Zealand's war effort through assistance in the production of essential equipment for light armoured fighting vehicles manufactured in New Zealand.

1943 saw the introduction of units in Auckland with an advertisement to gauge interest receiving 112 applications. The unit was temporarily located at St Mary's bay while permanent accommodation was organised. The four units first met together in January 1944 when they gathered together on Quail Island.

At the conclusion of the war the sea cadet corps had provided more than 130 personnel to the Royal Navy or Merchant Navy and had 23 former members present at the Japanese Surrender while aboard HMNZS Gambia.

=== Post War ===
Post war sea cadets were able to take advantage of the significant size and presences of both domestic and foreign navies with cadets being able to take trips on HMS Theseus in 1937. During the same year attempts were made to have the name changed to "Royal New Zealand Sea Cadet Corps" to bring the organisation in line with its commonwealth equivalents, unsuccessfully. Late in the year a carnival was held between 31 Squadron, Air Training Corps (Not the same 31 Squadron that exists today) was held at the tepid baths.

In 1948 a joint exercise was conducted between the sea cadet corps and the Air Training Corps which saw the sea cadets facilitating a mock attack on Ripapa Island which after four attacks saw the successful capture of the island by the sea cadet corps. The same year saw the first international invitation by the Royal Canadian Sea Cadets where 25 cadets were invited to an 'Empire Camp'.

The New Zealand Naval Board agreed in 1950 to provide uniforms to all members of the sea cadet corps and established the protocol of sea cadet officer's receiving commissions in the Royal New Zealand Naval Volunteer Reserve Special Branch.

1951 saw the proposal of closed cadet units being established in schools, similarly to how the New Zealand Cadet Corps operated. At this time the Sea cadet corps was made up of 397 personnel.

=== RS Feva introduction into service ===
Around 2006 the Sea Cadet Corps began research into acquiring a new and modern fleet of sailing craft for Cadet training. The Sea Cadet Corps Boats Officer, LT R. Glover sought feedback from every Navy Cadet unit in the country as to their requirements and thoughts about the new fleet. The result of this project was the selection of the RS Feva, manufactured in the United Kingdom. The first seven RS Fevas arrived in New Zealand in October 2009 through the importer, Takapuna Sailing Centre (Boats Bits Ltd.). A second delivery of five vessels arrived later in 2009, with each of the 17 units around the country having at least one craft by mid 2010.

The RS Feva is the first new class of training vessels the New Zealand Sea Cadet Corps has adopted since 1978.

=== Master Cadet Rank ===
In 2011 the rank of Master Cadet was replaced by the more generic rank of Under Officer with the last Master Cadets being either Commissioning or leaving the NZCF by the end of 2012.

== Organisation ==
=== National ===
The SCC is managed at a national level by the Commandant (usually a Regular Force Lieutenant-Colonel/Wing Commander/Commander), and their staff at Defence Force Headquarters in Wellington. It is supported by the Sea Cadet Association of New Zealand.

=== Area ===
The country is divided into 3 areas, Northern (Northern half of the North Island), Central (Southern half of the North Island) and Southern (entire South Island). Each area has a NZCF Training and Support Unit (CFTSU), commanded by NZDF Senior Non-commissioned Officer or Commissioned Officer. Area Coordinator, with advisors for Sea Cadet Corps units.

=== Unit ===
Each unit is managed by the Cadet Unit Commander, and their officers. Sea Cadet Corps units are commonly referred to as "Training Ships".

A typical unit has between one and four officers filling various roles. The Cadet Unit Commander appoints all personnel in the unit to their positions. Each unit has an Adjutant, Training Officer, and Stores Officer. These positions are usually filled by a commissioned officer (officers can hold multiple positions if necessary). One or more of the positions may have assistants, the assistants are often junior officers or Senior NCOs.

Each unit also has a cadet NCO holding the position of Ships Coxswain (COXN), this individual will almost always hold the rank of Warrant Officer (personnel occasionally are bestowed the position without the rank, however, this is a rare occurrence and only when the individual is close to meeting the promotional requirements). If the Training Ship is large enough, each division of cadets may be led by a Chief Petty Officer. The Ships Coxswain is normally responsible for supervising all the NCOs in their various tasks, as a result, the Coxswain can skip the normal chain of command, enabling them to liaise directly with the Unit Commander.

== Uniform and Insignia ==
=== Insignia ===
The uniform worn by SCC members is the same as that of the Royal New Zealand Navy, except that for all ranks, the lettering on the bottom of the rank insignia shoulder boards reads "CADET FORCES" rather than "NEW ZEALAND" to differentiate SCC personnel from RNZN personnel. Officer Ceremonial Dress Uniforms have a shoulder flash reading "NEW ZEALAND CADET FORCES" rather than "NEW ZEALAND" for the same reason. Cadets wear a cap ribbon on their caps with the wording 'T.S. (Name of Ship)', while officers and officer cadets wear the same cap insignia as RNZN officers.

As of 2024 SCC Cadets now wear black brassards on their dress uniforms.

=== Badges ===
Good Conduct Badge - Up to three may be awarded to a Cadet for each year of enrolled service during which their conduct is satisfactory and attendance is regular.

Seamanship Badge - This is the primary qualification of attainment for Sea Cadets. The RNZN Coxswains badge is used to denote this achievement.

Other Badges of Skill
Skill	Badge
Bugler	Bugle
Cook	Cook
Writer	Writer
Quartermaster	Boatswain Call and Chain

=== Uniforms ===
The Sea Cadet Corps follows the Royal New Zealand Navy with regards to uniform standards and clothing items, with all mandatory clothing being issued from the RNZN. In the past the system used was that a unit would be graded 1–5 based on the quantity of personnel that attended a units parade night. Based on that grading the unit would then be issued an annual allowance for the unit to order new uniform as replacements or to provide to new cadets.

In December 2020 a major overhaul was announced. In combination with the update to cadet net, new uniform will be issued directly to a new cadet upon their enrolment into a squadron. Unit equipment officers will source measurements for each cadet and enter them into CadetNet. The cadet will then be issued with uniform. Units will still maintain a local supply of uniform as spares however the bulk of uniform issued to new recruits will come from Headquarters New Zealand Cadet Forces.

=== Cadet Working Dress ===
First Introduced in August 2021 the Sea Cadet Corps and Air Training Corps have adopted a single multipurpose uniform named 'Cadet Working Dress' (CWD) that replaces the General Working Dress (GWD) currently used by the Sea Cadet Corps as its primary non ceremonial uniform. The Air Training Corps will adopt the uniform first to free up DPM for the New Zealand Cadet Corps. The style of the uniform is modeled off the RNZAF's General Purpose Uniform however lacks the flame retardant feature of the RNZAF version, this isn't seen as a necessity due to cadets rarely catching fire. This switch away from RNZN GWD is to allow a more streamlined logistics approach to working dress that will see costs decrease due to the much larger Air Training Corps being the primary consumer of the uniform.

While the uniform will be made of the same material and from the same supplier the uniform will retain the darker blue colour of the GWD

Cadets and Officers will be issued a set of Cadet Working Dress upon being issued their Half Blues and Full Blues uniform as part of the integrated logistics platform that will see new cadets issued a 'pack' of equipment and uniform from New Zealand Cadet Forces Headquarters.

As well as the key components, the New Zealand Cadet Forces intends to role out accessories such as matching rain jackets for cadets to either be supplied with outright, or purchase through the NZCF directly. More accessories are yet to be announced however warm weather equipment such as jerseys have been speculated by NZCF personnel.

The supplier for the Cadet Working Dress is based in Fiji. As a result, the 2021 outbreak of COVID-19 production and shipping of CWDs was reduced, delaying the introduction of the uniform. By early July 2021 the first shipment had arrived to the S4 Logistics team in Christchurch.

Navy Cadet Working Dress is scheduled to role out from late 2021 to early 2022. However, ended up not being phased in for some Navy units until mid 2024.

== Ranks ==
All active Sea Cadets are able to work towards being promoted. The size of each Training Ship dictates the quantity of each rank that a unit is allowed.

=== Cadet and Non-Commissioned Officer Ranks ===
Cadet and Non-Commissioned Officer Ranks are based on the RNZN ranks; and are:

Rank	Abbreviation	Basic Requirements to be awarded	Designation
Ordinary Cadet	OCDT	Awarded upon successfully completing 4 parades of Basic Common Training, whilst a member of a Sea Cadet Corps Training Ship	CDT 1
Able	ACDT	Competed 1 Star Training as per the NZCF 170c; No disciplinary or performance issues.	CDT 2
Leading	LCDT	Successfully completed the NZCF Junior Non-Commissioned Officer Course; Completed 2 Star Training as per the NZCF 170c; No disciplinary or performance issues.	CDT 3
Petty Officer	POCDT	Completed the NZCF Senior Non-Commissioned Officer Course; No disciplinary or performance issues.	CDT 4
Chief Petty Officer	CPOCDT	Completed a minimum of six months serving in the rank of Petty Officer.; No disciplinary or performance issues.	CDT 5
Warrant Officer	WOCDT	Must be in line for the position of Ships Coxwain; Completed a minimum of six months in the rank of Chief Petty Officer.; No disciplinary or performance issues.; Note: smaller training ships occasionally promote personnel to Warrant Officer from the rank of Chief Petty Officer.	CDT 7

The CDT prefix/suffix is used to distinguish regular force personnel from those of the Cadet Forces.

While not all cadets become NCOs, by demonstrating knowledge and skills in subjects including cadet forces knowledge, general service knowledge, leadership, firearms safety, and seamanship studies, all get the chance to train and progress through the different levels of training: Ordinary Cadet, 1 Star, 2 Star, and 3 Star.

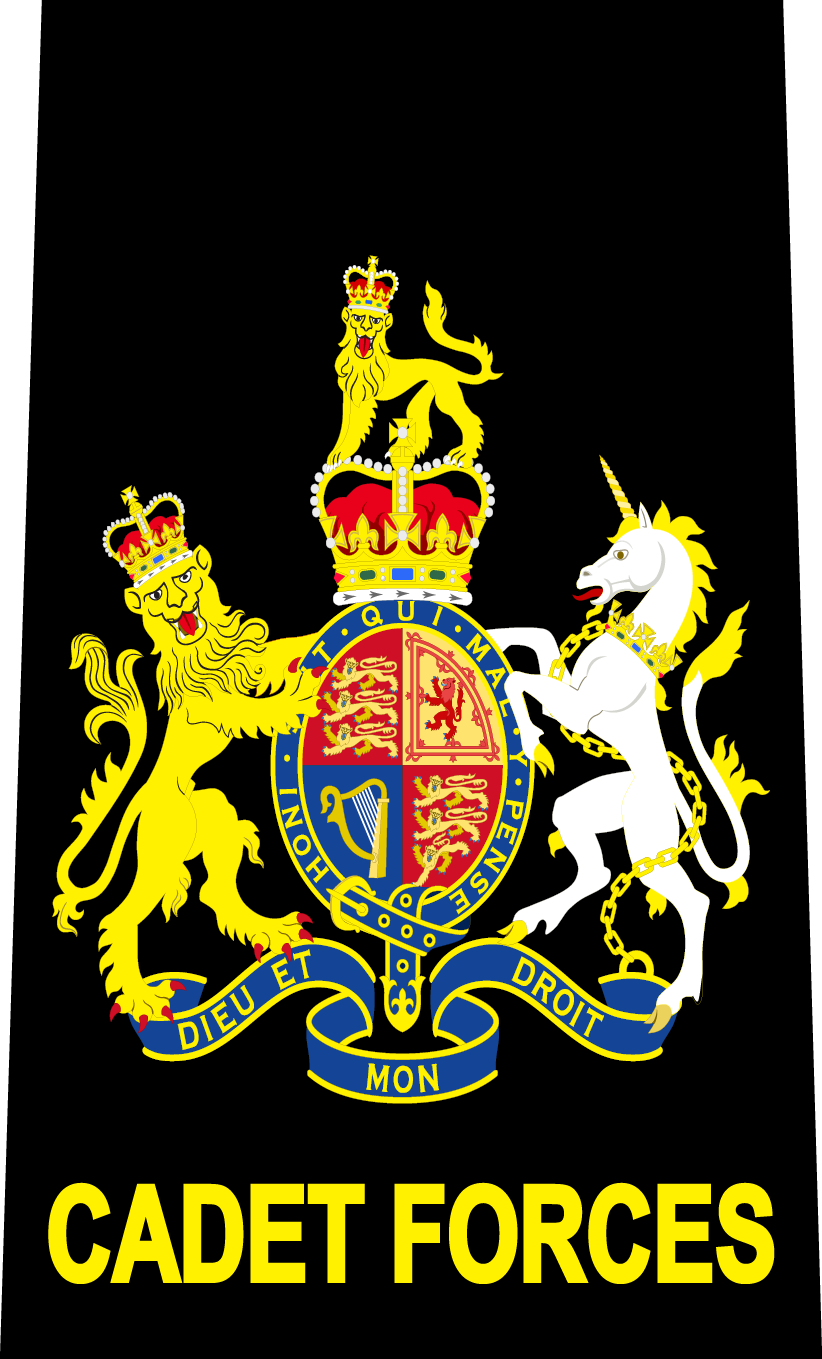
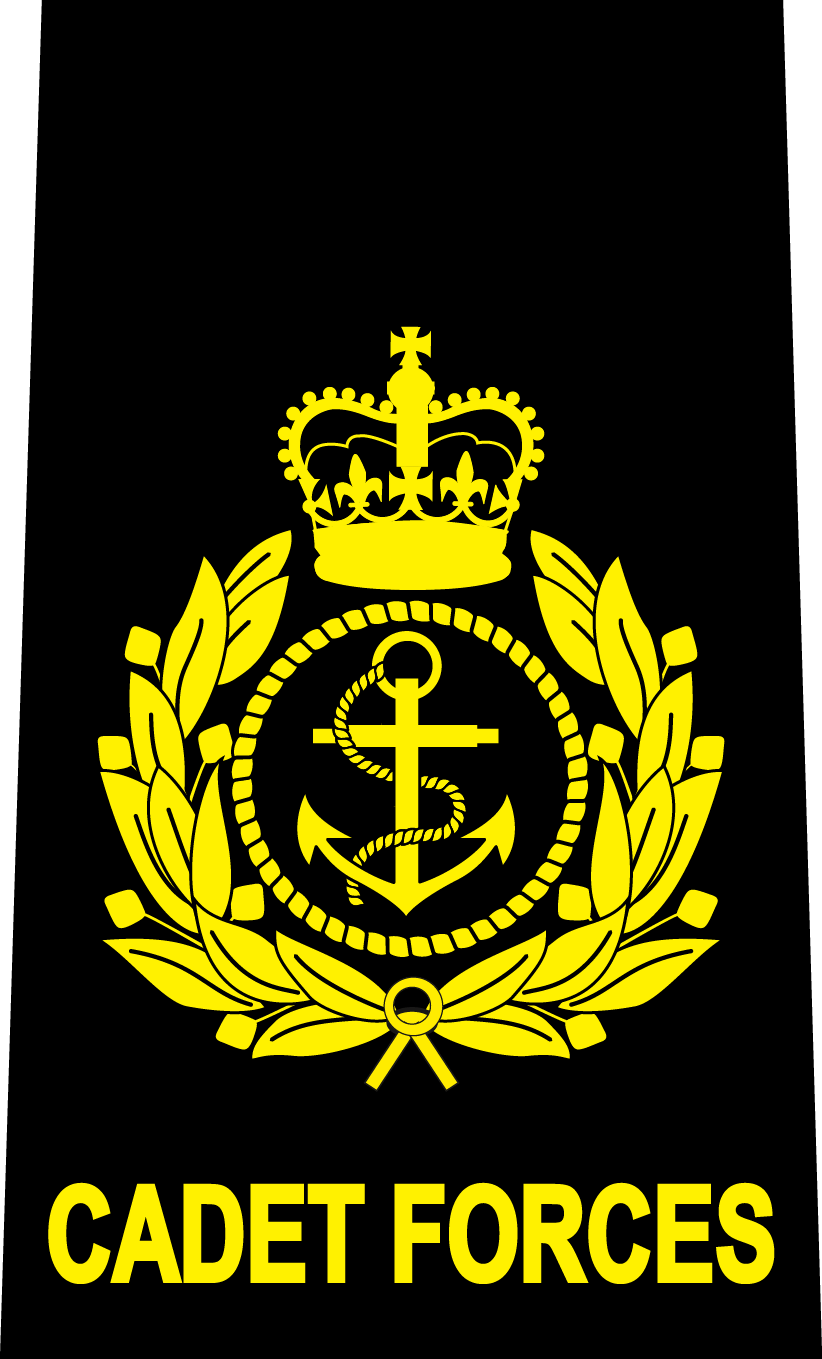
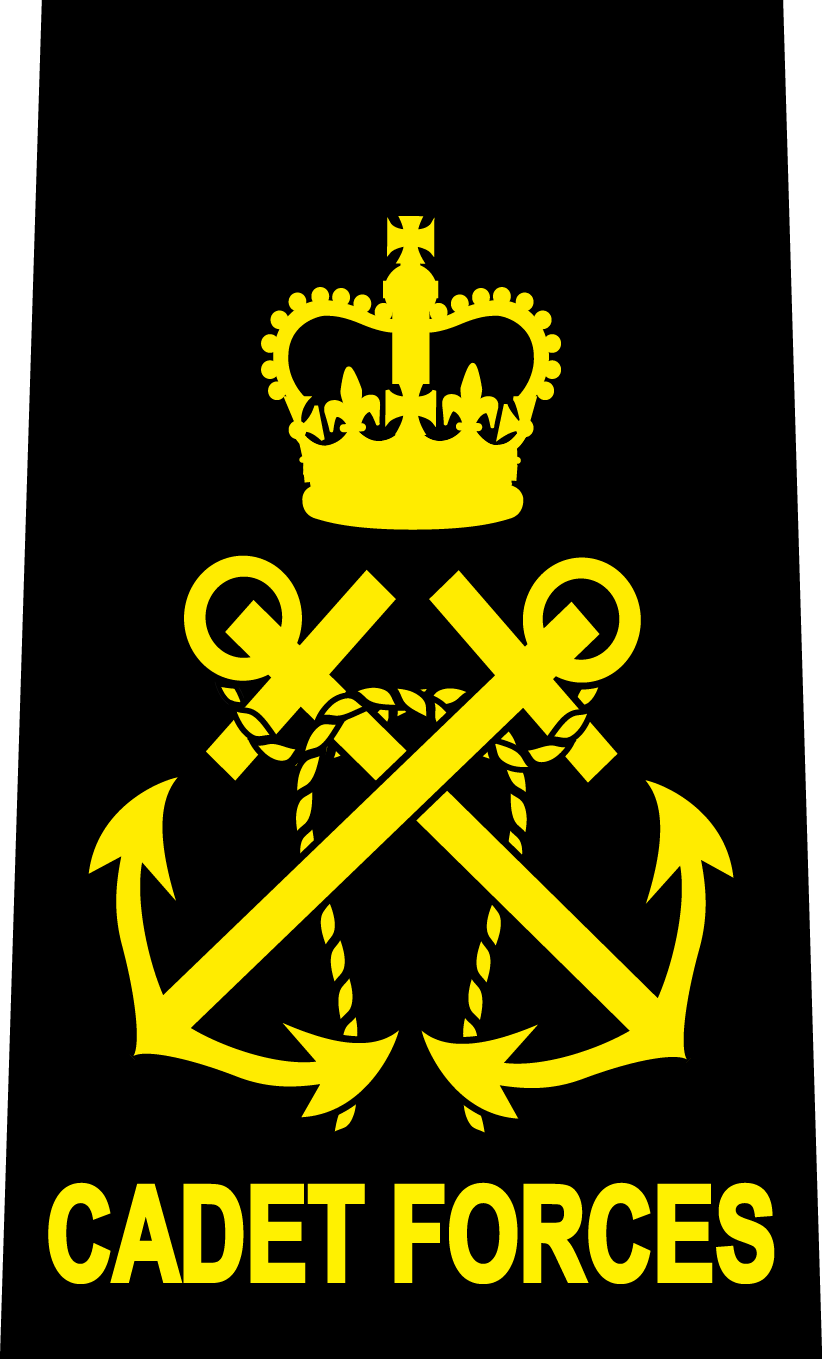
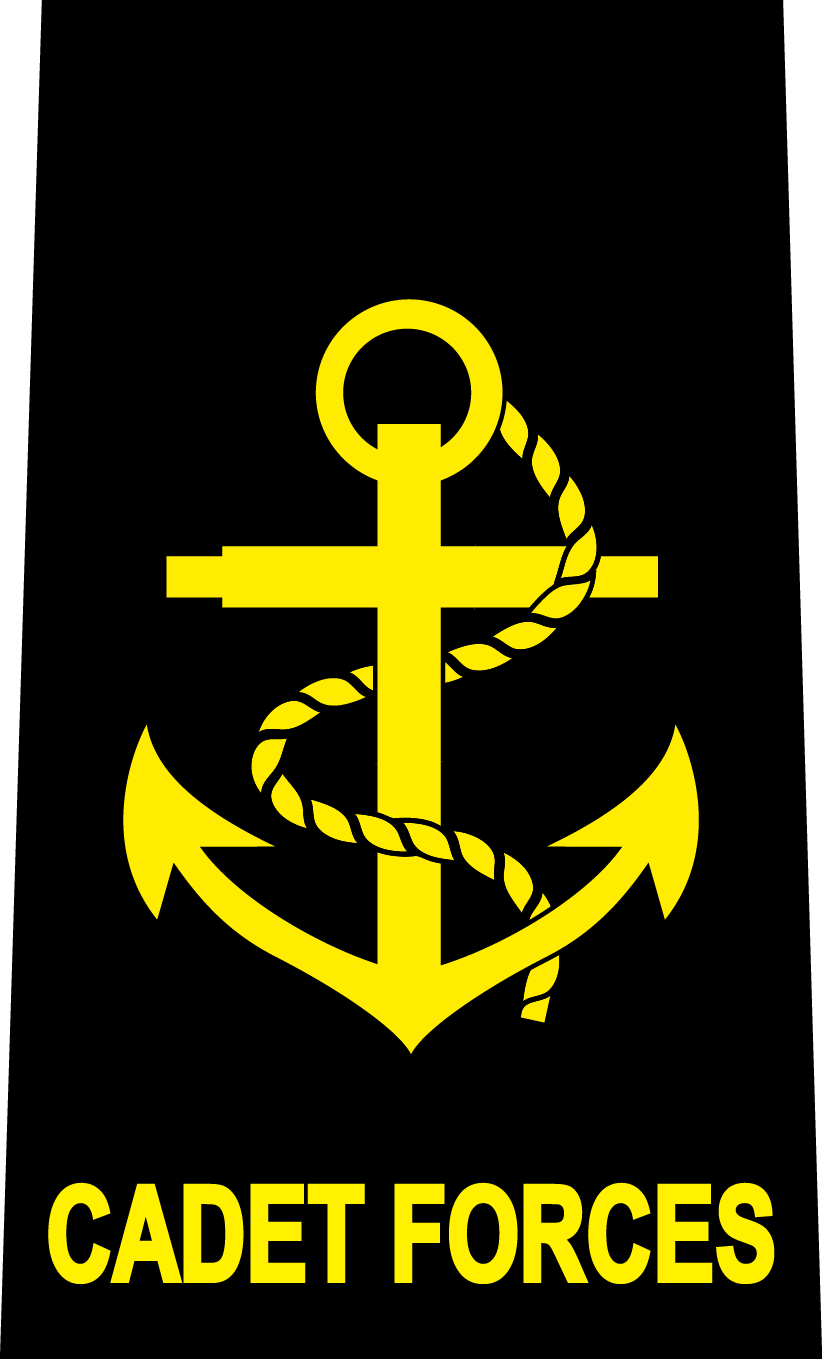
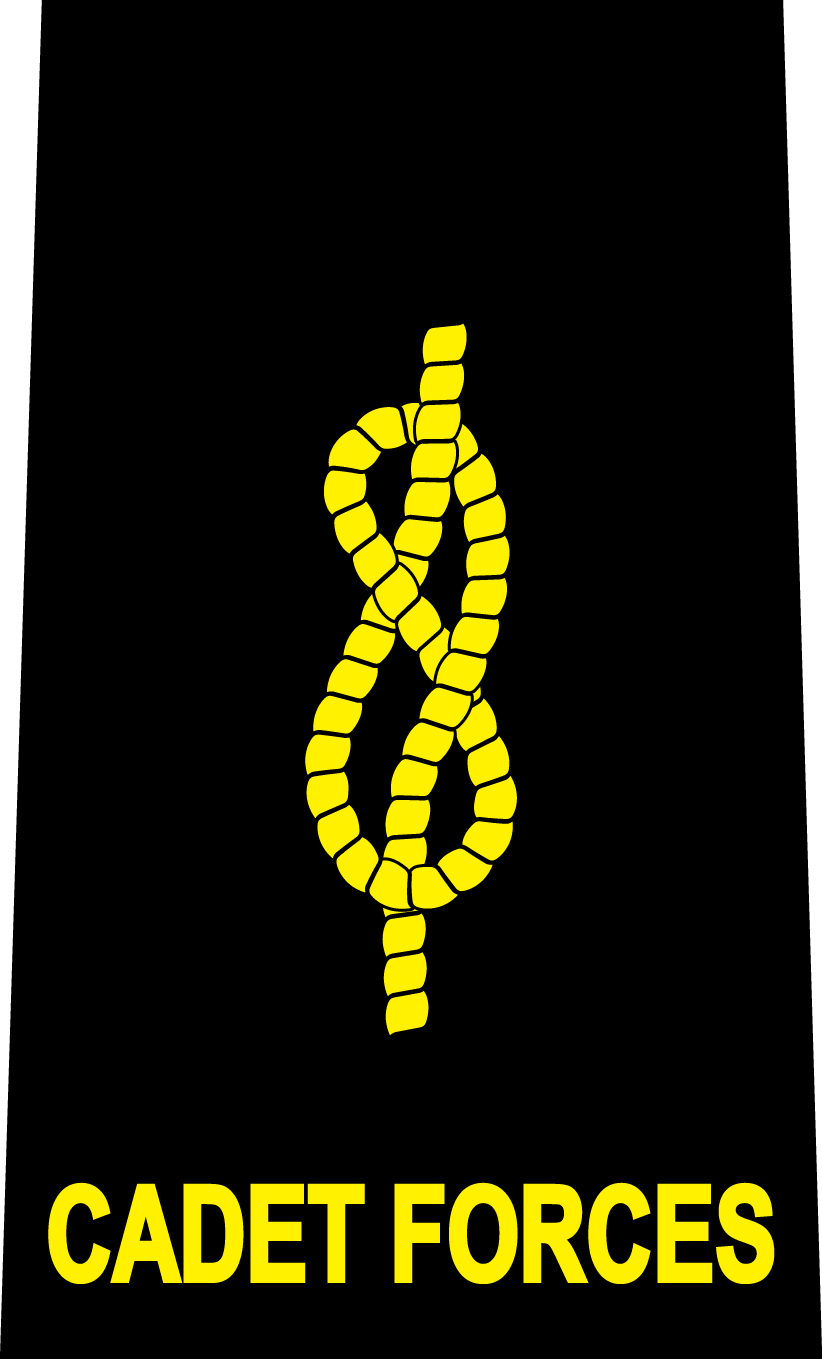
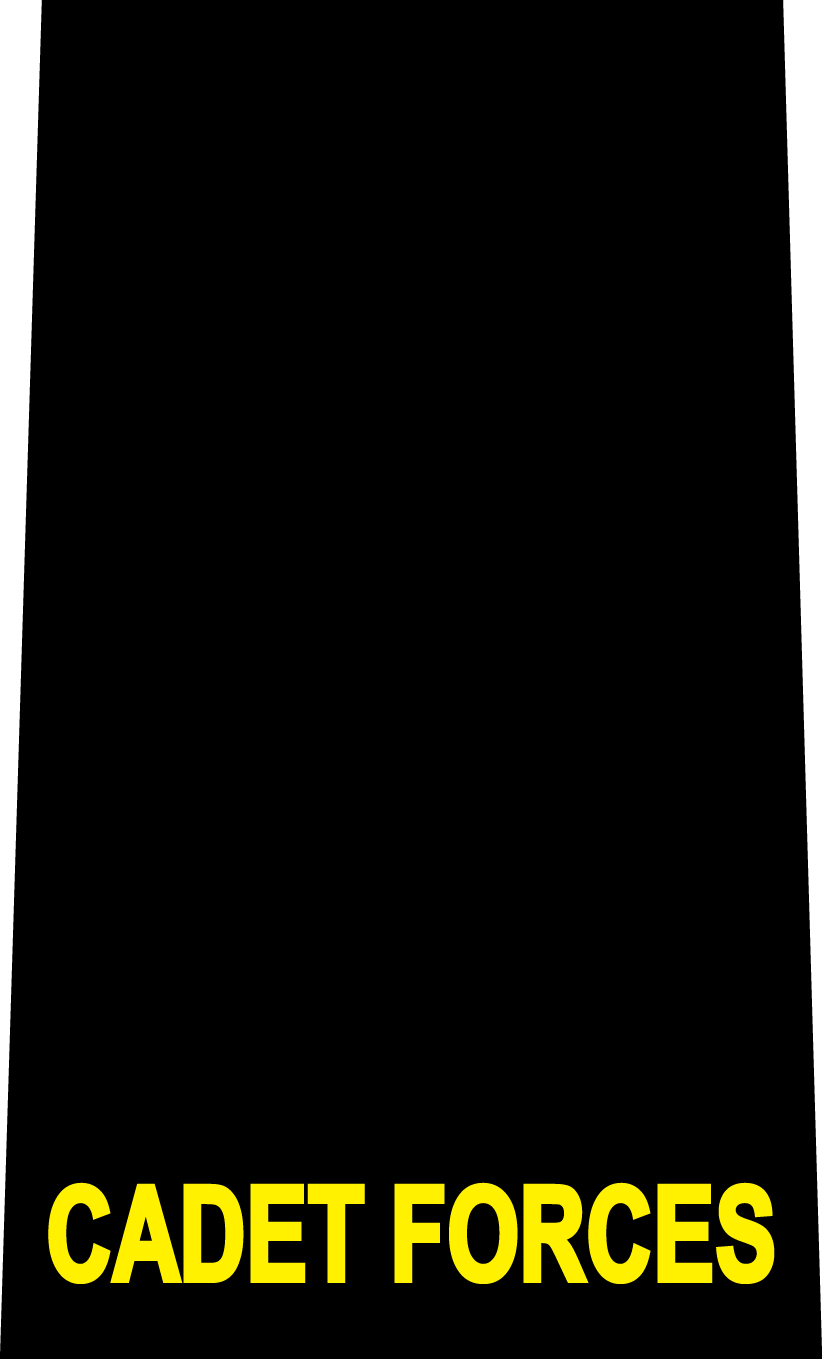
NZCF Cadets	CDT 7	CDT 6	CDT 5	CDT 4	CDT 3	CDT 2	CDT 1
New Zealand Sea Cadet Corps
New Zealand Sea Cadet Corps	Warrant Officer Cadet		Chief Petty Officer Cadet	Petty Officer Cadet	Leading Cadet	Able Cadet	Ordinary Cadet
New Zealand Sea Cadet Corps	WOCDT		CPOCDT	POCDT	LCDT	ACDT	OCDT

=== Commissioned Officer Ranks ===
Sea Cadet Corps Officers also follow the RNZN Rank structure, and are:

Note: All instances of Lieutenant are pronounced "Leftenant" in line with the United Kingdom Ministry of Defence pronunciation.

Rank	Abbreviation	General Requirements to be awarded	Designation
Officer Cadet	OFFCDT	Two entry paths; Serving cadet, upon turning 18 decide to commission upon which the rank will be awarded before the individuals next birthday.; Alternatively the direct entry option sees a civilian adult member decide they wish to commission, they will need to serve 6 months at the unit to establish whether the professional relationship is sustainable for both the unit and the individual, after 6 months and upon completion of the relevant online learning modules HQNZCF may award the rank. Note: this rank replaces Under Officer as of 2020. Historically this rank was only awarded for students attending NZCF Officer Commissioning courses.	O1
Acting Ensign	A/ENS	Awarded upon successful completion of the NZCF Officer Commissioning Course. Personnel will serve one year in an acting capacity. After one year efficient service they are substantiated as Ensigns and awarded their Commission Parchment (on the authority of the Minister of Defence)	N/A
Ensign	ENS	Have completed twelve months efficient service in the Acting Ensign rank.; Be assessed by the Cadet Unit Commander as suitable and recommended for appointment to a confirmed commissioned.; Recommended by Cadet Unit Commander and the Area Coordinator of the relevant Cadet Force Training and Support Unit.; Approved by the Commandant NZCF.	O2
Sub Lieutenant	SLT	Have completed two years efficient service in the substantive rank of Ensign.; Successfully completed the Instructional and Training Management course; Recommended by Cadet Unit Commander and the Area Coordinator of the relevant Cadet Force Training and Support Unit.; Approved by the Commandant NZCF.	O3
Lieutenant	LT	Have completed four years efficient service in the substantive rank of Sub Lieutenant.; Recommended by Cadet Unit Commander and the Area Coordinator of the relevant Cadet Force Training and Support Unit.; Approved by the Commandant NZCF	O4
Lieutenant Commander	LTCDR	Have completed five years efficient service in the substantive rank of Lieutenant; Successfully completed the NZCF Command Course and intend to serve either as a Cadet Unit Commander or Area Support Officer.; Recommended by Cadet Unit Commander and the Area Coordinator of the relevant Cadet Force Training and Support Unit.; Approved by the Commandant NZCF.	O5
Commander	CDR	Only the Assistant Commandant holds this rank.	O6

Officer Ranks and Insignia in the SCC

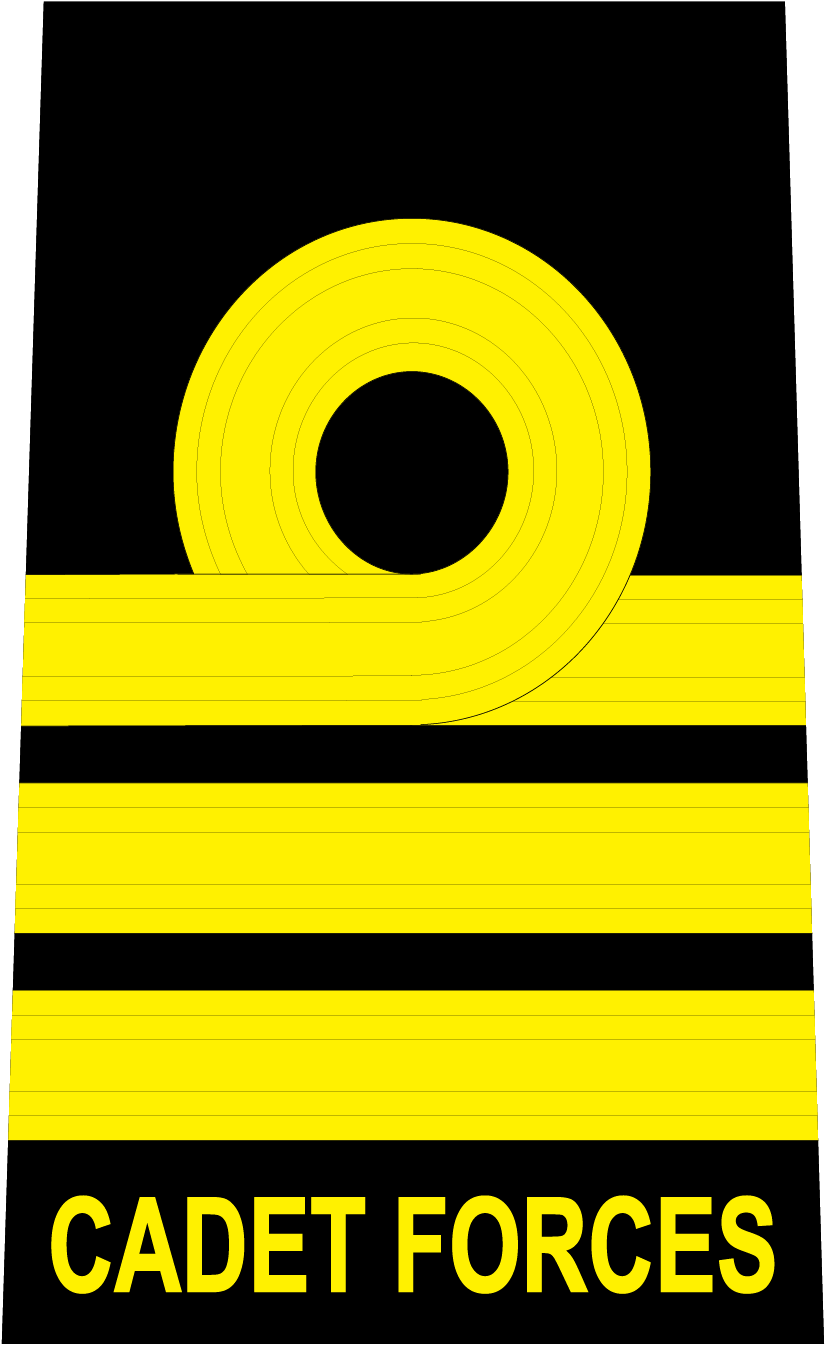
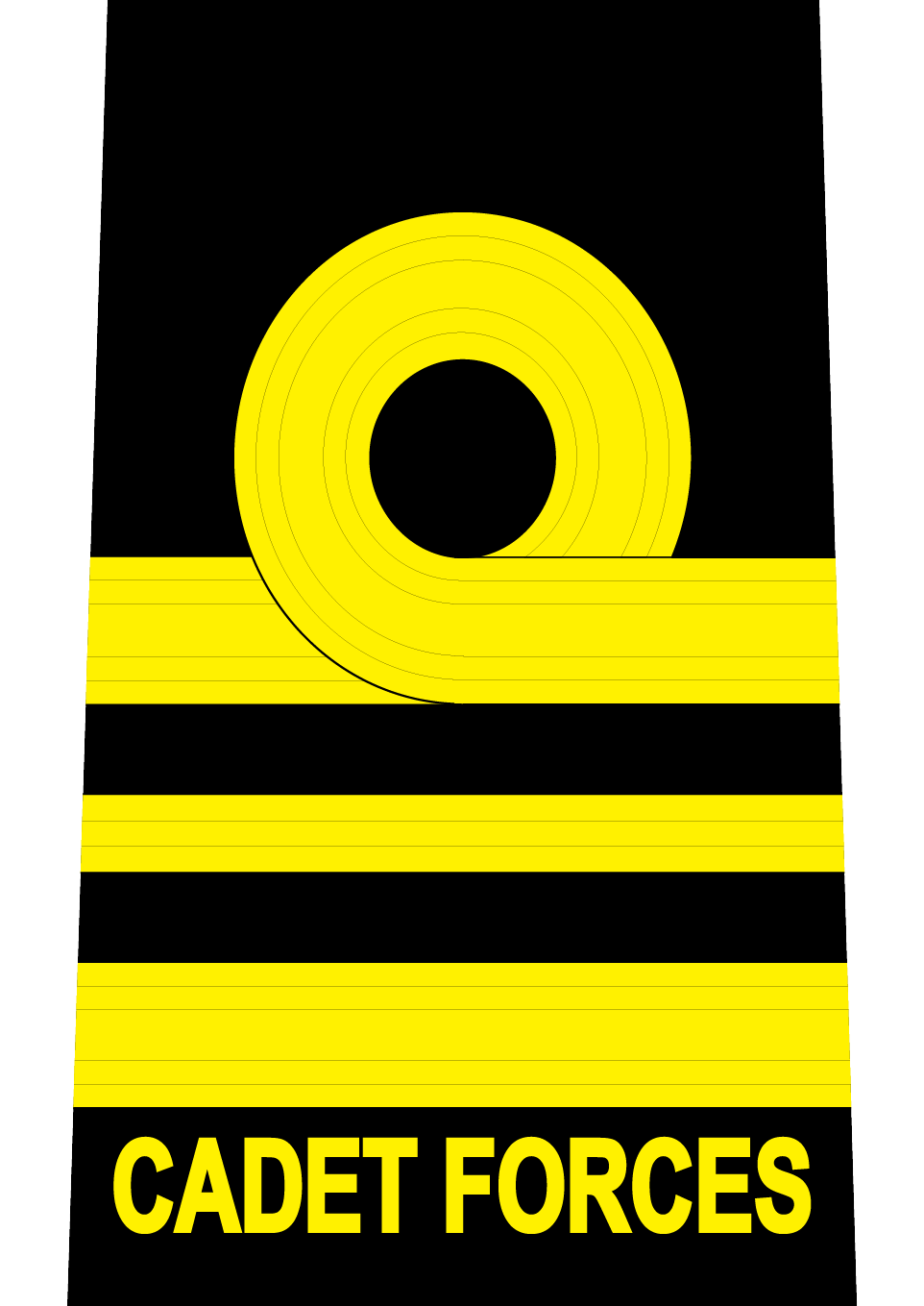
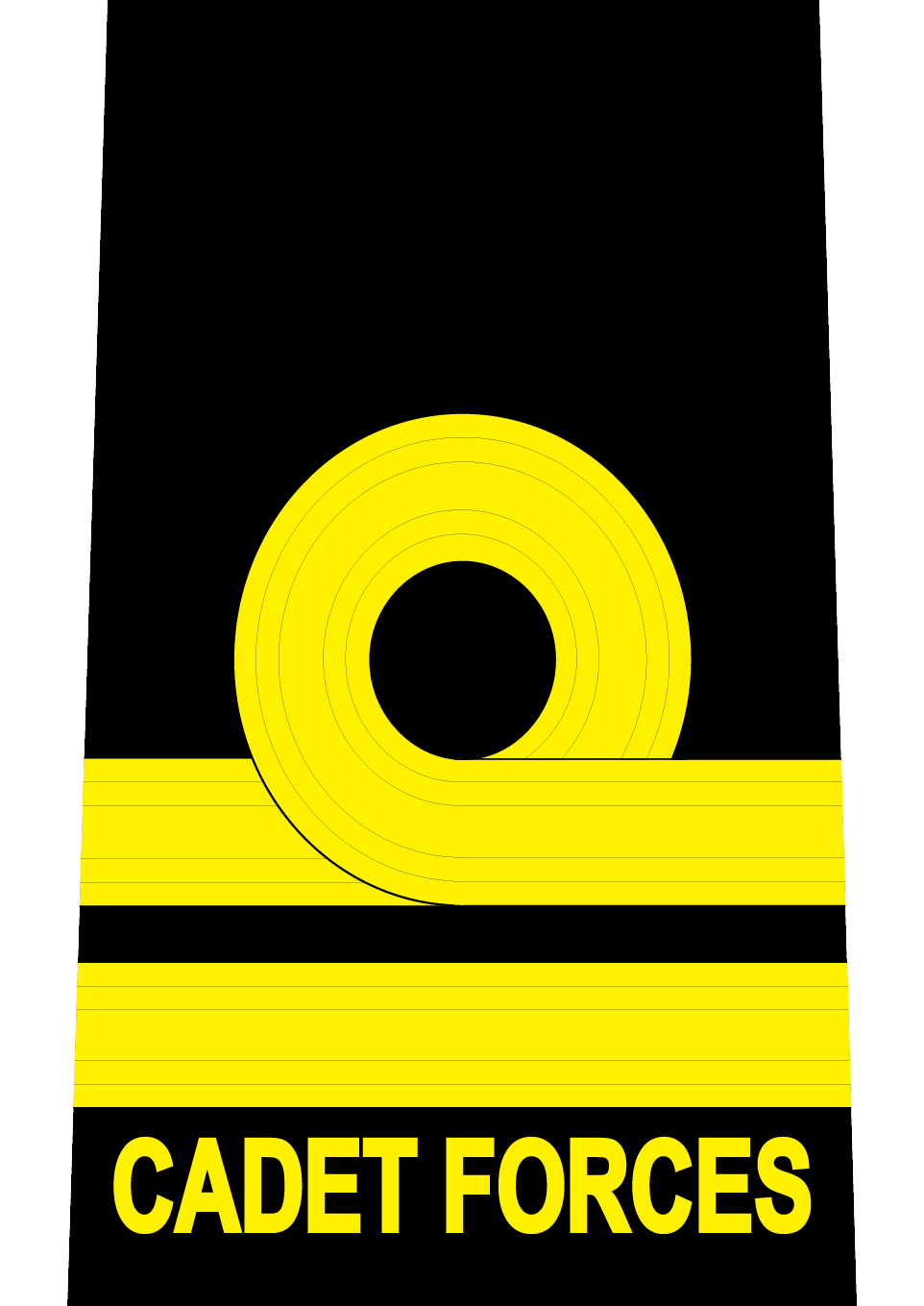
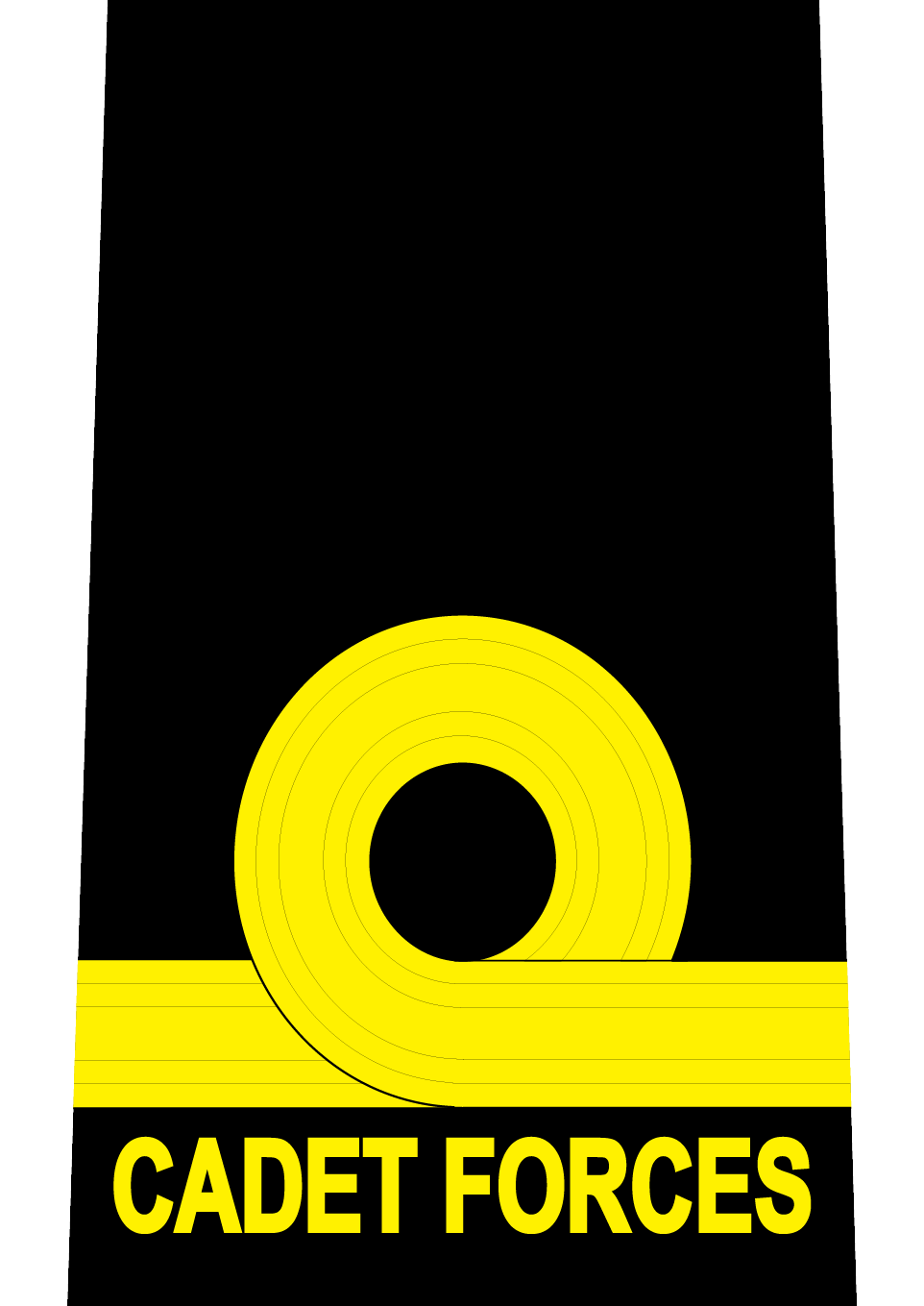
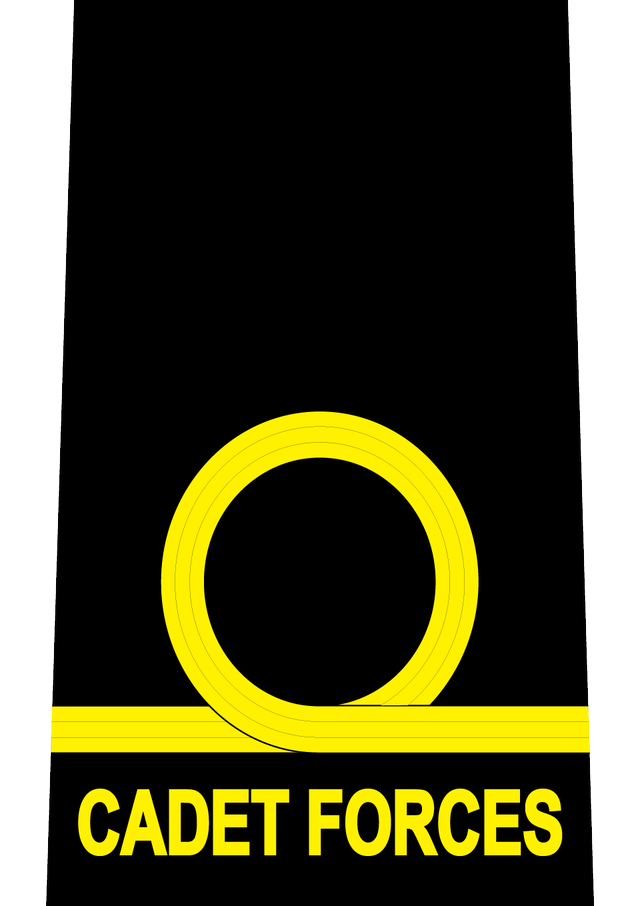
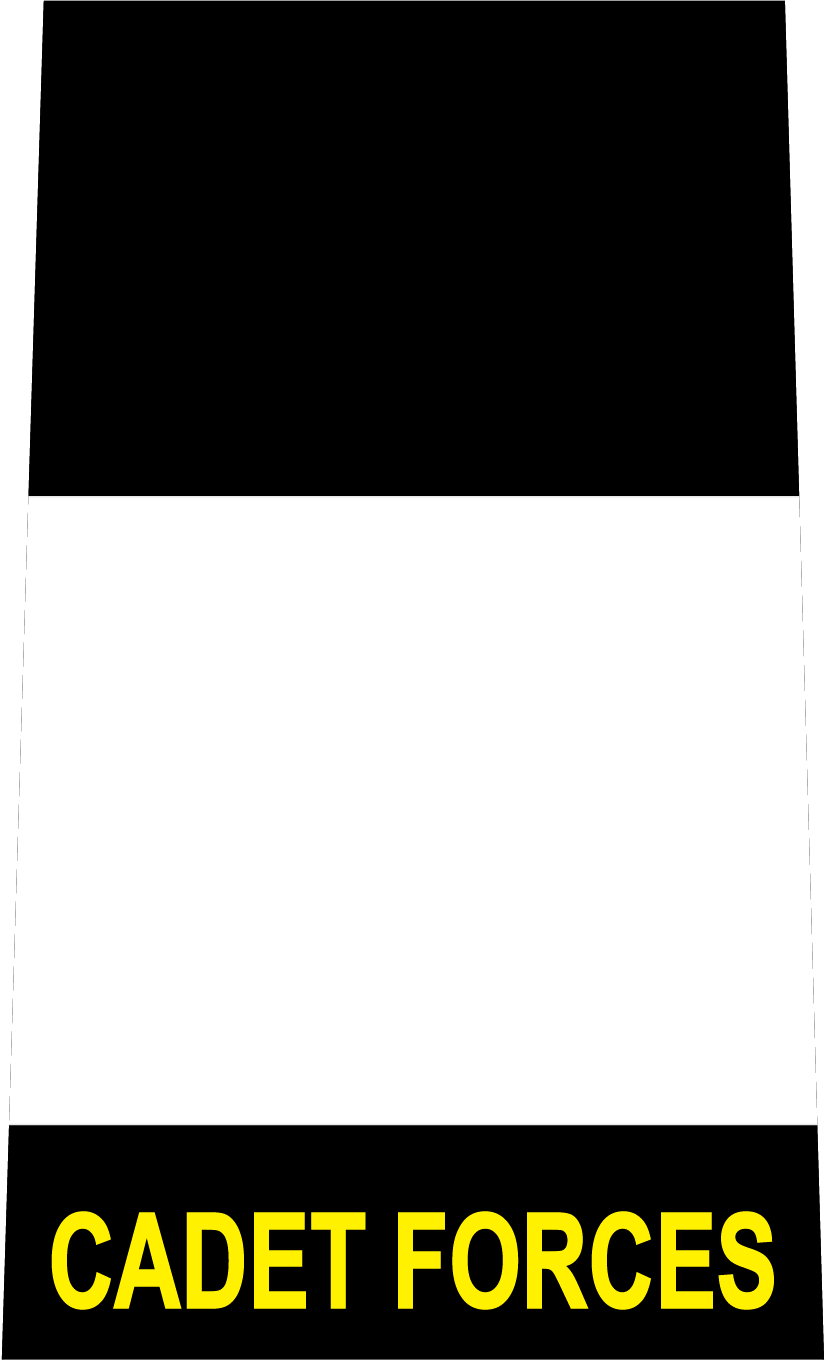
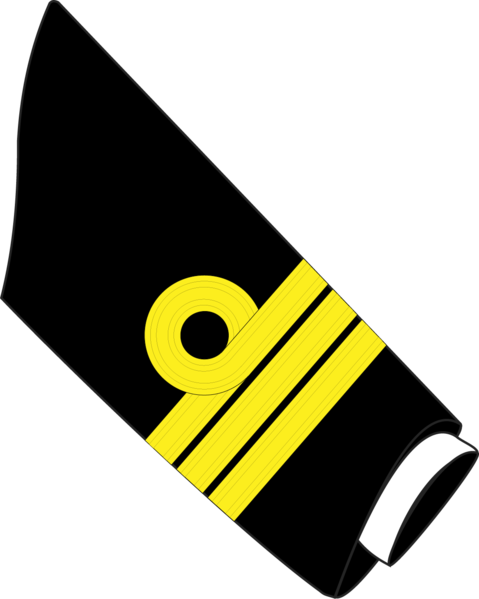
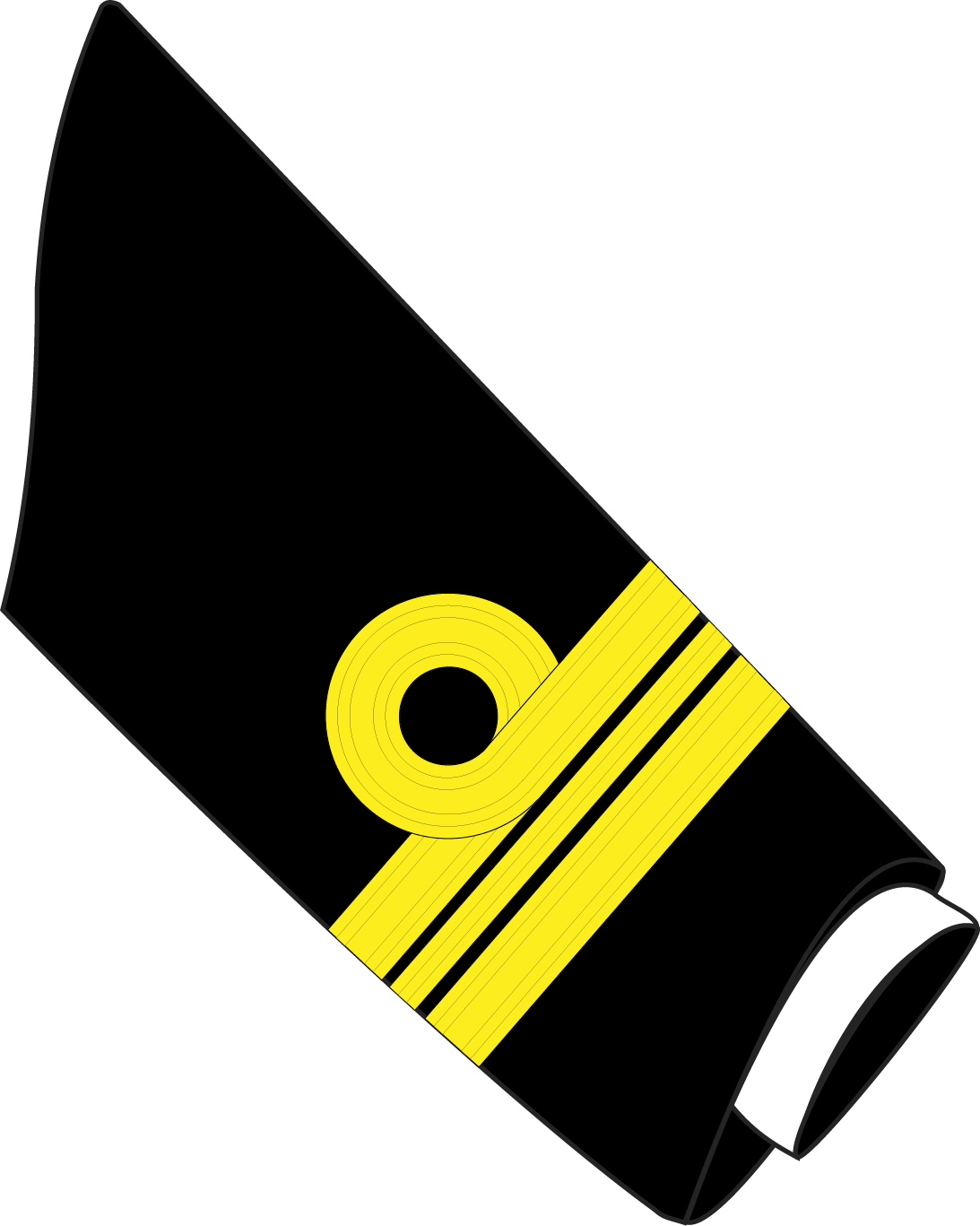
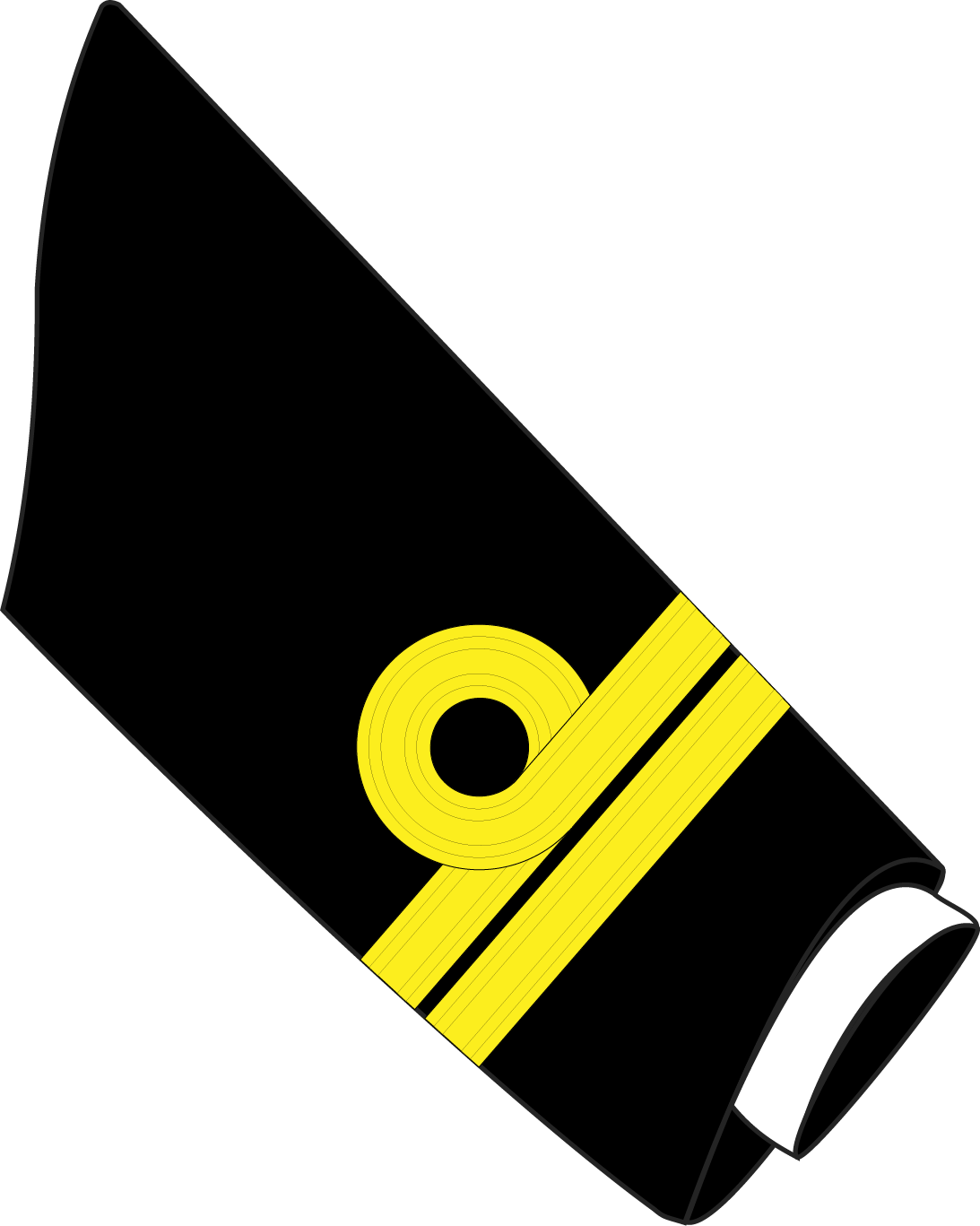
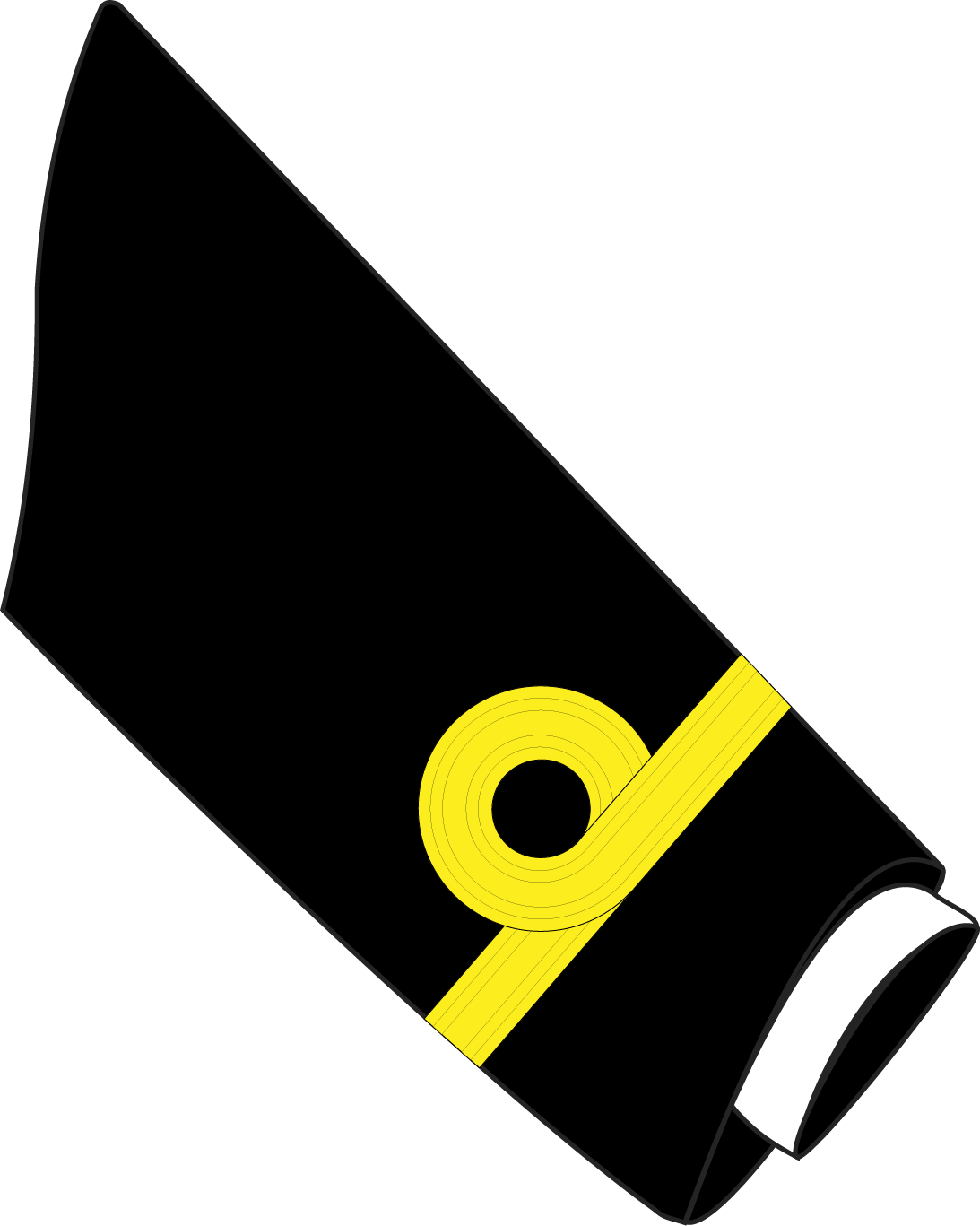
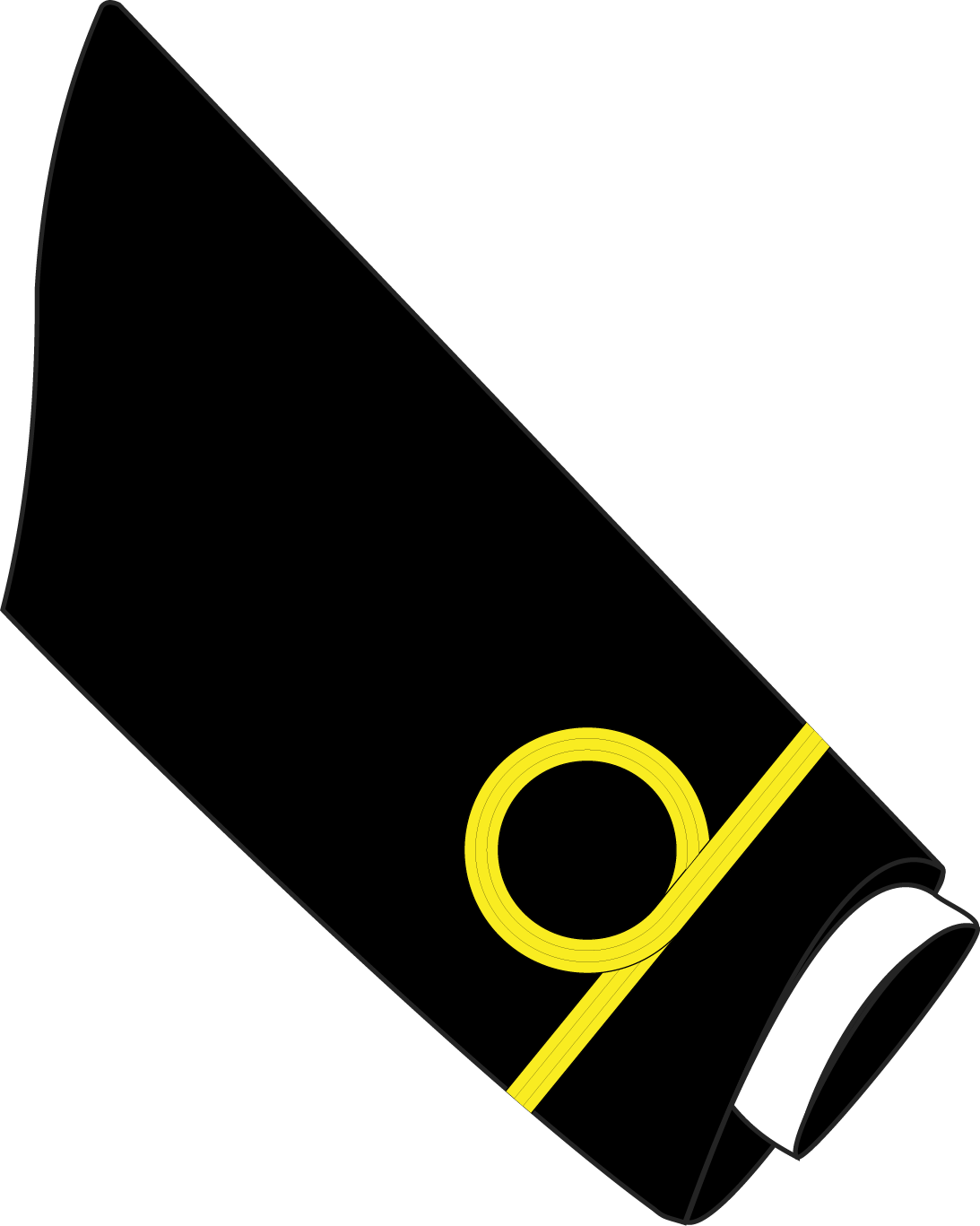
NZCF Officers	OFF 6	OFF 5	OFF 4	OFF 3	OFF 2	OFF 1
Navy Cadets
Navy Cadets						No Insignia
Navy Cadets	Commander	Lieutenant; Commander	Lieutenant	Sub Lieutenant	Ensign	Officer cadet
Navy Cadets	CDR	LTCDR	LT	SLT	ENS	OFFCDT

While New Zealand Cadet Forces Officers hold commissions on behalf the New Zealand Parliament, via the Minister of Defence. They are not entitled to be saluted by New Zealand Defence Force personnel. Due to the rank emblems being identical other than the "New Zealand" and "Cadet Forces" identifier, occasionally Cadet Force Officers are saluted by NZDF personnel, if this happens Cadet Force Officers are encouraged to return the salute to be polite.

New Zealand Cadet Force Officers do not hold precedence of rank over NZDF personnel e.g. a Cadet Force Lieutenant Commander has no authority to issue orders to a NZDF Ensign or Non-Commissioned Officers.

New Zealand Cadet Force Officers continue to undergo training throughout their career, following the yet to be released NZCF 170O.

== Membership ==
=== Cadet members ===
Interested personnel can join between the ages of 13 and 15 (or if attending the first year of high school) and can stay on without being promoted to the age of 18. Senior Non-Commissioned Officers may serve until their 20th birthday. The exception is the sole school-based unit, as opposed to city or regional based units. Hamilton's Fraser High School Cadet Unit permits all students enrolled at the school to enroll in the unit.

Other than black lace up shoes, all uniform is provided upon enrolment into a unit and completion of a training camp where wearing of the uniform is taught. Bonds are sometimes held to ensure that they are returned.

==== Fees ====
Unit fees are set by each unit Parent Support Committee annually. Due to fluctuating operating costs, these vary from unit to unit dependent on the type of activities the unit has planned, although typically fees will be no more than $200 annually.

=== Adult members ===
==== Adult Cadets ====
In 2017 the New Zealand Cadet Forces updated their Child Protection policy surrounding cadets who are either Non-Commissioned Officers or personnel who are completing cadet level training that are aged 18 and over.

There is a deliberate delineation between an 'Adult' and an 'Officer' as the latter has specific authority to exercise command and control over cadets and other NZCF Officers.

The key difference between a cadet who is an adult and a cadet who is under 18 is that adult cadets and indeed all adults within the New Zealand Cadet Forces are charged with the responsibility of maintaining the safety and welfare of cadets during all NZCF activities. While this doesn't mean that cadets who are classified as adults hold authority over other cadets due to their age, it means that adult cadets are expected to at the very least vocalize to an Officer or Supplementary Staff member when they believe safety and welfare have been compromised.

Cadet Non-Commissioned Officers who are 18 or older are issued a thin white band which is sewn into the rank slide of the individual immediately above the "CADET FORCES" lettering and below the rank emblem.

==== Officers and Supplementary Staff ====
Adult members can serve in two capacities: commissioned officers or Supplementary Staff. Officers are commissioned into the New Zealand Cadet Forces, with the post-nominal letters NZCF, at the rank of second lieutenant, and can be promoted to lieutenant, captain or major after completing the necessary training and service.

In 2014 the organisation introduced a new position of National Support Officer (NSO). This position was designed to place a New Zealand Cadet Force Officer at high level of influence within HQNZCF, which traditionally had his position had been solely occupied by New Zealand Defence Force Personnel. In 2016 with the adoption of the continental staff system the position was renamed to Assistant Commandant. NZCC officers, as opposed to an ATC or SCC officers, hold the rank of lieutenant colonel.

Officers are unpaid volunteers, therefore they receive no pay for routine parades and unit activities. They are paid when attending training courses run by the New Zealand Defence Force.

Supplementary Staff or SS for short, are civilians who help train cadets. They do not wear uniform, but they are generally treated similarly to officers by cadets. Members of the NZDF are occasionally attached to cadet units to assist in conducting training. This is normally because they know a cadet/officer in that unit, or if they have a particular interest in cadet forces. They are addressed as "Instructor" or by cadets choice, "Sir" or "Ma'am".

==== Fees ====
Most NZCF Officers do not pay any membership fees, this is typically to balance the time and effort put in by NZCF Officers. While Officers are not encouraged to, a large amount contribute anyway, by way of purchasing stationary and equipment for their unit.

== Activities ==
=== The Duke of Edinburgh's Hillary Award ===
==== Officers and Adults ====
Any Commissioned Officer in the NZCF or Supplementary Staff member that has an active security clearance is eligible to become an award facilitator, allowing cadets within their unit to actively participate in the award and allows any progress towards the award to be signed off. There is no limit to the number of staff members that can be award facilitators, allowing larger units to focus a staff member to each section of the award.

While the award is directed towards young adults and within the NZCF specifically, the cadets and NCOs, Junior Officers and adults under the age of 25 are also eligible to complete any of the awards (although the Gold award would be the most reasonable).

==== Cadet Participation ====
Run in partnership with the Duke of Edinburgh's Hillary Awards the award is a multi year, voluntary, non-competitive programme of practical, cultural and adventurous activities, designed to support the personal and social development of young people aged 14–25, regardless of gender, background or ability. It offers an individual challenge and encourages young people to undertake exciting, constructive, challenging and enjoyable activities in their free time.

Personnel undertaking the award can begin the activity either through their school, a third party provider, or the New Zealand Cadet Forces with more than 9,000 young adults undertaking the programme each year.

Within the frame of the New Zealand Cadet Forces, parade nights and community service events like Anzac Day parades can count towards the service requirement while weekend camps and courses can count towards the skill section of the awards. The Cadet Fieldcraft Activity can also count towards the Adventurous Journey for all three awards. Cadets are also able to retroactively claim work up to 3 months of work they've done before signing up for their first award. For example, if a cadet completed a NZCF promotional course such as the Senior Non-Commissioned Officer Course shortly before signing up for an award, then they would be able to retroactively use the course for their residential project.

Cadets that successfully complete an award are entitled to wear the pin of the highest award they receive on their brassard (if Air Training Corps or New Zealand Cadet Corps) or Jacket (if Sea Cadet Corps).

Year	Bronze	Silver	Gold
Description	Bronze is the first level of The Award, for your Bronze Award you need to complete 13 hours of two sections and 26 hours of one section.	Silver is the second level of the Award, for Silver you need to complete 26 hours of each section if you have completed bronze and an additional 13 hours if you haven't.	Gold is the highest level of The Award, for Gold you need to complete 12 months of each section if you have completed silver and an additional 26 hours if you haven't. At gold you also need to complete the Residential Project.
Eligibility	You Can start the Bronze award in the year you turn 14.	You can start your silver once you have completed bronze or are 15	You can start gold as soon as you are 16

=== Parade Nights ===
Every unit holds Parade Nights around 2–3 hours long weekly during school terms. Each parade night usually begins and ends with a parade. The starting parade is used to inspect uniforms, and to inform the cadets on the parade night's activities. The final parade to inform the cadets on upcoming events in the unit. Between the parades, the cadets undergo classroom, or practical instruction.

=== Shooting ===
Units conduct regular range training with smallbore rifles. Some units have their own armories and ranges at their parade hall. Cadets must pass a DFTT (Dry firing training test) before being allowed on the range. Each year the Smitt Trophy shooting competition is held between all the Sea Cadet Units in New Zealand.

=== Ceremonial Parades & Events ===
Participating in public events and community activities such as Anzac Day, Armistice Day and Sea Sunday services are part of a Navy Cadet unit routine.

=== Boat work & Rigging ===
Develop and maintain safe seamanship skills in power, sail, oar, and paddle craft, and learn the correct way to utilise ropes and pulleys. Each unit has and operates 2 Crown's, 2 RS Feva's, and various support vessels.

=== Damage Control Exercises ===
Damage Control(DC) in cadet forces is all about learning how to understand the theory of how dangerous situations can occur and what steps can be taken to mitigate said situations. After learning the theory behind DC opportunities can often arise for cadets to get some first-hand experience dealing with real fires or other forms of DC.

=== International Exchanges ===
Each year dozens of sea cadets go on exchange programs through ISCEP (International Sea Cadet Exchange Program), run through the International Sea Cadet Association this facilitates exchanges to countries such as South Korea, Hong Kong, Australia, Canada, The United States of America, the United Kingdom, and more.

Local exchanges are also held, for example each year an exchange occurs between the Royal Canadian Sea Cadets and units from the lower Northern Area and upper Central Area. Designated "CANEX" this is one of many exchanges that happen outside of the ISCEP.

=== Ship Visits ===
When Royal New Zealand Navy ships visit local ports, Sea Cadet Corps units are invited to view the ship, to run recruiting the events, or often both. Sea Cadets often receive a more personalised tour of the vessel and are occasionally able to stay on the ship while it transits between cities in New Zealand.

Merchant naval vessels and foreign naval vessels also extend invitations to Sea Cadet Corps units to visit in a similar capacity to the RNZN.

== Local Training ==
Each Unit holds at least one night per week in order to undertake the Cadet Development Framework. Each unit employs a training officer whose role it is to create and implement a local training programme. The Cadet Development Framework is a four-year programme which provides cadets with the opportunity to develop skills in leadership, aviation knowledge, drill, firearms training, fieldcraft, and more.

The programme provides standardisation for training and expected development within Cadet Units for CDT(E) – CDTWO(E). Some content is applicable to all three Corps of the NZCF, whilst some is specific to particular Corps.

The content of the Four-Year Training Programme is not designed to fill every period during parade nights in a calendar year, but intentionally leaves scope for Cadet Unit Commanders to add content that will add value to their communities, strengthen Unit identity and provide opportunities for cadets that they may not receive outside of NZCF. However, only completion of the prescribed training will ensure that cadets can continue moving through the development model. Delivery of the content of the Four-Year Training Programme is at Cadet Unit Commander's discretion. In time, further resources to assist in delivery will be developed, including parade night lesson plans, instructor guides and additional resources. Currently available resources should be used in the first instance for delivery of training. Where gaps in knowledge or skills exist, Area Advisors and/or Area Support Officers should be engaged.

The training is split into three different levels off learning that correspond with a cadets progression.

- Lead Self – Years 1–2
- Lead Teams – Year 3+
- Lead Leaders – Year 4+

Junior Cadet Training
Year One Cadets – 1 Star		Year Two Cadets – 2 Star		Year Three Cadets – 3 Star	
To achieve 1 Star a cadet must complete the following first year subjects.	Lessons	To achieve 2 Star a cadet must complete the following second year subjects.	Lessons	To achieve 3 Star a cadet must complete the following third year subjects.	Lessons
DRL – Drill	1.1–1.14	DRL – Drill	2.1–2.9	DRL – Drill	3.1–3.7
ETH – Ethics & Safety	1.1–1.5	FAS – Firearms Safety & Marksmanship	2.1–2.4	FAS – Firearms Safety & Marksmanship	3.1
FAS – Firearms Safety & Marksmanship	1.1–1.5	LDR – Leadership, Communication & Management	2.1–2.2	LDR – Leadership, Communication & Management	3.1–3.5
LDR – Leadership, Communication & Management	1.1	MED – Health & Medical	2.1–2.6	MED – Health & Medical	3.1–3.4
MED – Health & Medical	1.1	NAV – Navigation	2.1–2.6	NAV – Navigation	3.1–3.3
NAV – Navigation	1.1–1.10	OPS – Operations, Traditions, History	2.1–2.11	OPS – Operations, Traditions, History	3.1–3.9
OPS – Operations, Traditions, History	1.1–1.13	PHY – Physical & Adventurous Training	2.1–2.2	RCD – Radio, Cyber, Drones	3.1–3.2
PHY – Physical & Adventurous Training	1.1–1.6	SEA – Seamanship	2.1–2.9	SAL – Systems Approach to Learning	3.1–3.11
RCD – Radio, Cyber, Drones	1.1–1.5			SEA – Seamanship	3.1–3.5
SEA – Seamanship	1.1–1.15				

Senior Cadet / Non Commissioned Officer Training
Year Four Cadets – Advanced		Additional Training	
To achieve Advanced a cadet must complete the following fourth year subjects.	Lessons	Suggested additional training subject to unit availability to participate.	Lessons
ETH – Ethics & Safety	4.1	DRL – Drill	5.1–5.6
EXP – Exercise Planning & Risk Management	4.1–4.14	OPS – Operations, Traditions, History	5.1–5.2
LDR – Leadership, Communication & Management	4.1–4.9	PHY – Physical & Adventurous Training	5.1–5.2
OPS – Operations, Traditions, History	4.1–4.2	MED – Health & Medical	5.1
SAL – Systems Approach to Learning	4.1–4.5	RCD – Radio, Cyber, Drones	5.1–5.3
SEA – Seamanship	4.1–4.7		

== Courses ==
=== Tri-Corps Courses ===
- Junior Non-Commissioned Officers Course (JNCO)
- Senior Non-Commissioned Officers Course (SNCO)
- Cadet Fieldcraft Activity
- Officer Fieldcraft Activity
- Officers Commissioning Course
- Officers Instructional Technique & Training Management Course (ITTM)
- Officers Command Course
- Shooting Coaches Course
- Range Conducting Officer Course (RCO)
- Drone Operators Course

=== SCC Courses ===
- Cadet Coxswain Course
- Marine Safety Officer Course (MSO)
- Sea Time

== Competitions ==
=== Regatta ===
- Area Sea Cadet Skills (also known as Area Regatta)
- National Sea Cadet Skills (also known as National Regatta)

National Regatta Leaderboard (Since 2013)
Unit	Wins
TS Achilles (Auckland City)	6
TS Talisman (Nelson)	2
TS Taupo (Porirua)	2
TS Amokura (Wellington City)	1
TS Bellona (Auckland North Shore)	1
TS Godley (Christchurch)	1

Year	Area Regatta Winner			National Regatta Winner	National Regatta Location
Year	Northern	Central	Southern	National Regatta Winner	National Regatta Location
2026	TS Achilles	TS Amokura	TS Godley	TS Achilles	Tamaki Leadership Centre
2025	TS Achilles	TS Amokura	TS Royalist	TS Achilles	Tamaki Leadership Centre
2024	TS Achilles	TS Amokura	TS Godley	TS Amokura	Wellington
2023	TS Achilles	TS Amokura	TS Godley	TS Godley	Cass Bay, Lyttelton Harbour
2022	TS Achilles	TS Amokura	TS Godley	TS Achilles	Cass Bay, Lyttelton Harbour
2021	TS Leander and TS Chatham (Combined team). Note: TS Achilles represented the area at nationals.	TS Amokura	TS Talisman	TS Achilles	Wellington
2020	Nil. No regattas conducted due to COVID-19			Nil	Nil
2019	Nil. No Area Regattas conducted, in favour of one large national regatta with all units represented.			TS Achilles	Tamaki Leadership Centre
2018	TS Achilles	TS Taupo	TS Talisman	TS Achilles	Wellington
2017	TS Bellona	TS Taupo	TS Talisman	TS Bellona	Tamaki Leadership Centre
2016	TS Leander	TS Taupo	TS Talisman	TS Talisman	Tamaki Leadership Centre
2015	TS Leander	TS Taupo	TS Talisman	TS Taupo	Wellington
2014	TS Bellona	TS Taupo	TS Talisman	TS Taupo	Wellington
2013	TS Chatham	TS Amokura	TS Talisman	TS Talisman	Tamaki Leadership Centre
2012	Unknown	TS Amokura	Unknown	Unknown	Unknown
2011	Unknown	Unknown	Unknown	Unknown	Unknown
2010	TS Leander	TS Amokura	TS Steadfast	Nil	Army Bay, Whangaparāoa
2009	TS Rangiriri	Unknown	Unknown	Unknown	Unknown

=== National Efficiency Competition ===
Each year, the Sea Cadet Association of New Zealand (SCANZ) holds a competition for the most efficient unit in the country. Each area (Northern, Central and Southern) selects one unit, which is awarded either Charles Palmer Cup, The HMNZS Gambia Shield, or the South Island Annual Efficiency Shield, respectively. Then a naval officer inspects each of the three units chosen and selects the winning unit. The winning unit earns the Ex-Royal Navalmans Trophy which they are entitled to keep for a year, and earns a placement for one cadet aboard the sail training ship Spirit of New Zealand.

=== Shooting Competitions ===
==== Smit Trophy ====
The Smit Trophy shooting competition represents the New Zealand Sea Cadet Corps national shooting competition. All NZCF Training Ships are eligible for the competition.

This trophy was presented to the New Zealand Navy Board by the directors of E.J. Smit and Zoom of Westbroek, Netherlands, builders of HMS PRIZE to perpetuate the deeds of the ship in her wartime role and of her commanding officer (Lieutenant Commander W.E. Sanders VC, DSO, RNR). The trophy is presented annually to the winner of the Sea Cadet Corps small-bore postal shoot.

This competition also represents one of the only opportunity for New Zealand Sea Cadet Corps personnel to earn the NZCF Marksman Badge. In order to be awarded the badge a cadet must, while competing in the Smit Shooting Competition achieve a score of 80% or more. The other Two Badges are awarded under this competitions ruleset.

There is a common misconception that NZCF personnel can only attain the marksman badge in the Wallingford competition. This is not the case. The NZCF 160 Competitions and Awards Manual states the following.

Attained a score of 80% or more during any of the following shoots:

(1) National Smit, Gunson and Wallingford competitions.

(2) Units practicing for the National Smit, Gunson and Wallingford competitions.

(3) Area and National SCC Regattas, NZCC Skills and ATC Skills competitions.

(4) Competition shoots between Cadet Units.

Note: All shoots are to be conducted under the same rules as the National

Shooting Competitions.

	Competency Badge	First Class Shot Badge	Marksman Badge
Criteria	60% Score (≥60/100)	70% Score (≥70/100)	80% Score (≥80/100)

==== Ffennell Shooting Competition ====
The Ffennell competitions are a group of small-bore rifle matches for the youth of the Commonwealth. New Zealand Cadet Forces units contest the Class B competitions (using issued rifles and sights). The matches are held under the authority of the Commonwealth Postal Competitions Committee (CPCC). All international correspondence on behalf of the CPCC will be handled by the Council for Cadet Rifle Shooting. The aim of these team matches is to encourage the Youth of the Commonwealth to participate in the sport of small-bore target rifle shooting.

Entry is open to any unit or sub-unit of the following:

1. New Zealand Cadet Forces;
2. Junior Servicemen of the New Zealand Defence Forces in one establishment; and
3. Other youth groups approved by the CPCC.

Units may enter one or more teams. Each team shall consist of eight firers. A shooter cannot shoot on more than one team. The team captain may or may not be one of these eight. All members of the team must be under the age of 19 years on the day of firing the match, and be serving members of the same unit or sub-unit.

Each team member will fire two cards, 10 rounds to count being fired at each card, with two rounds fired at each aiming mark. Sighting shots will be completed before the practice begins. The whole team need not complete shooting in one day. Highest Possible Score (HPS) is 200. Team HPS is 1600.

== See also ==
- List of Training Ships in the Sea Cadet Corps
- Cadets (youth program)

=== Sea Cadets ===
- International Sea Cadet Association
- United Kingdom Sea Cadet Corps
- Other nations' Sea Cadet Corps

=== Navy League ===
- Navy League of New Zealand
