= Crown (sail dinghy) =

SCC Crown
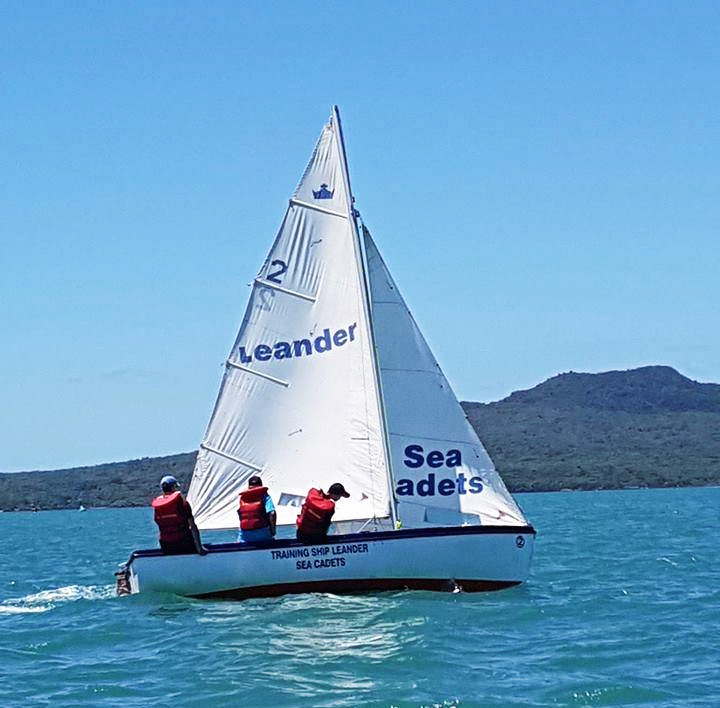
- Crown sailed by TS Leander Crown

Development
- Design: One-Design
- Name: SCC Crown

Boat
- Crew: Sailing 2-6; Rowing 3-8
- Displacement: 850 kg (1,870 lb)

Hull
- Type: Monohull
- LOA: 5.1 m (17 ft)

Hull appendages
- Keel: Centreboard

Rig
- Rig type: Bermuda

The Crown is a four-person sailing dinghy. It was constructed by the Royal New Zealand Navy dockyard in the 1970s. The Crown is widely used as the main training vessel for the New Zealand Sea Cadet Corps.

== Performance and design ==
The Crown can be rigged in two configurations; for rowing (also known as pulling) and for sailing.

The Crowns are made out of fiberglass these are light and very strong.

The boat is suitable to be sailed by 4 sailors, but can be sailed by 2 to 6 sailors. In the rowing configuration the boat can hold a crew of 8.

== Gallery ==
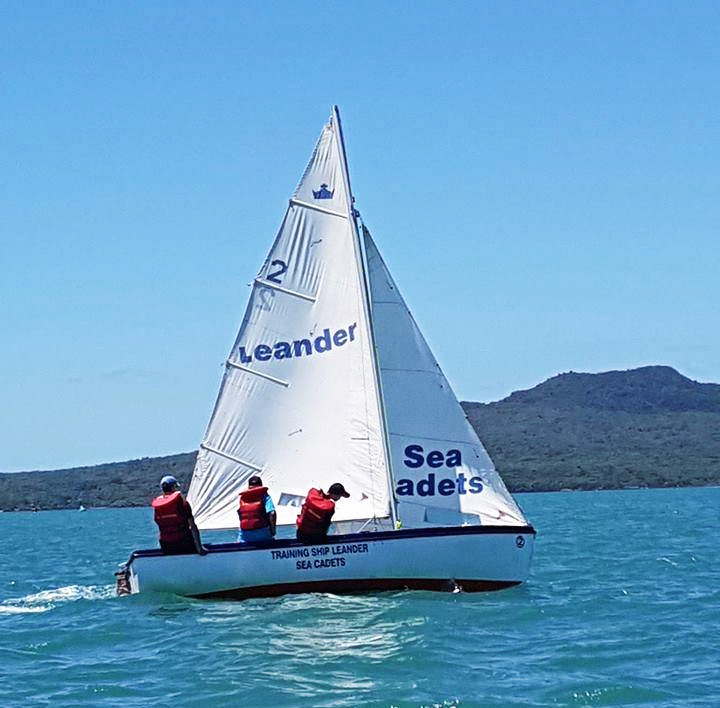
Crown in sailing configuration

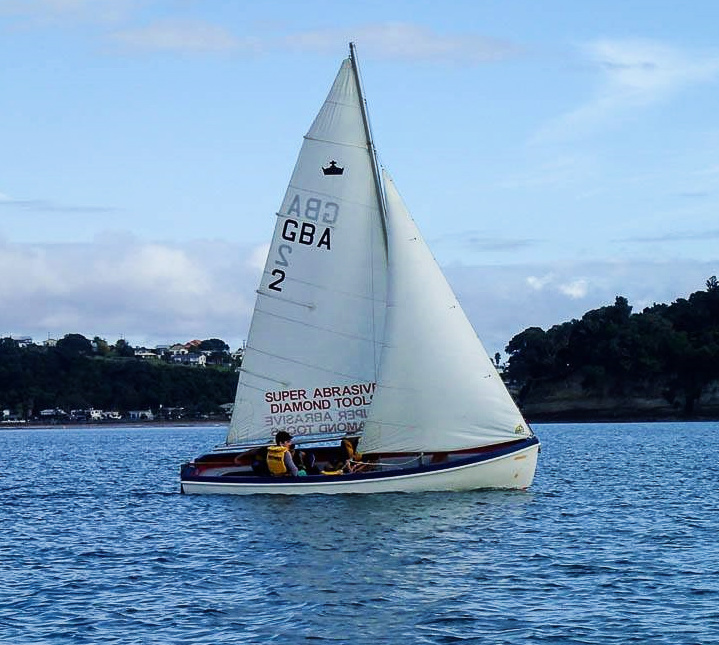
Crown in sailing configuration

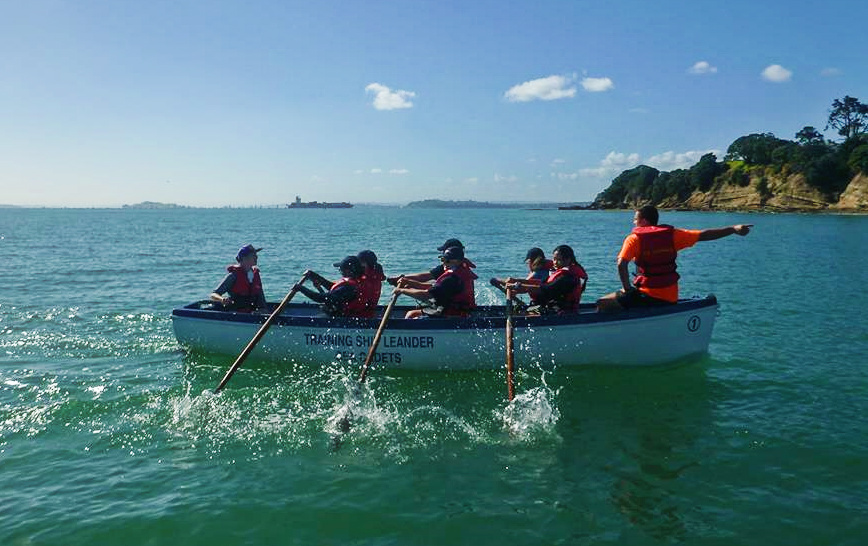
Crown in pulling configuration

== See also ==
- New Zealand Sea Cadet Corps
