= Austrian knot =

Type of elaborate design on dress uniforms

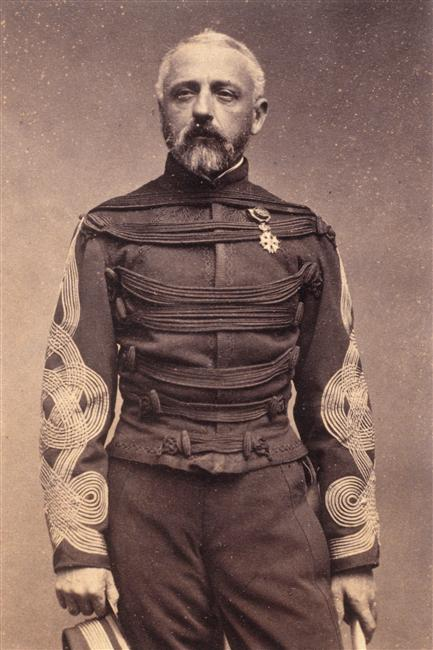
French General Félix Douay wearing nœuds hongrois on his sleeves, c1870.

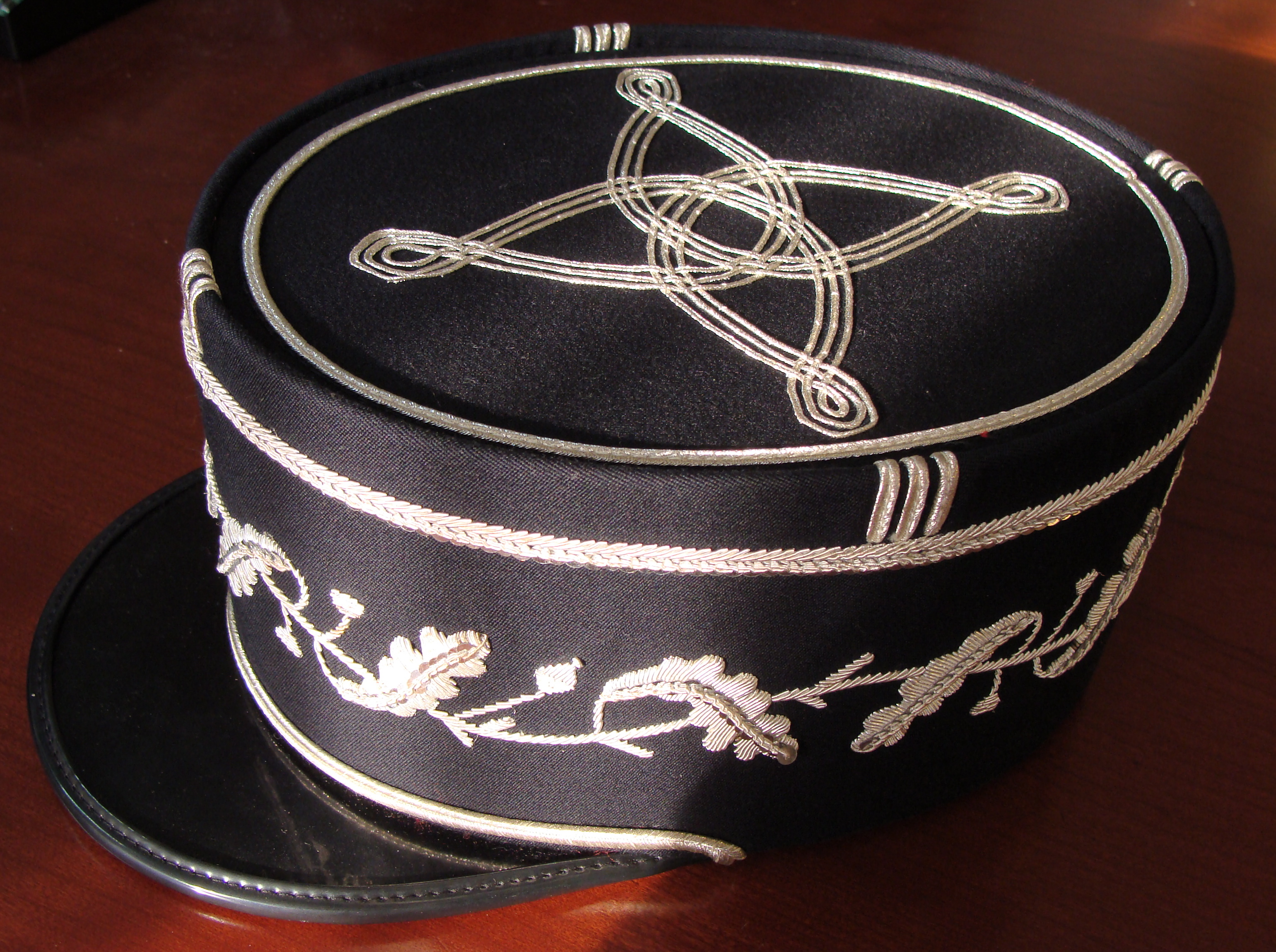
kepi (no longer in use) of a French commissaire de police, with the cruciform pattern nœud hongrois on the top. 1986

An Austrian knot (or Hungarian knot), alternatively warrior's knot or vitézkötés, is an elaborate design of twisted cord or lace worn as part of a dress uniform, usually on the lower sleeve. It is usually a distinction worn by officers; the major exception is the hussars, in which Austrian knots are worn by all ranks. British cadet under officers wear Austrian knots as part of their rank insignia.

== History ==
Of Hungarian origin, the vitézkötés (in English "warrior's knot") evolved as an indicator of rank among hussars of the Hungarian army, and became part of the Hungarian noble attire since the 16th century. Later, as other nations added hussars to their armies, they started to use the knot as well. The reason for this was that hussar regiments were often established by Hungarian nobles and some retained the name of their founder; for example the Ladislas Ignace de Bercheny.

In the Austrian (later Austro-Hungarian) army of the 18th century epaulettes were widely perceived as foreign (due to their French origin) and thus unacceptable. In the hussar regiments ranks came to be denoted by braided gold cords on the sleeve, with the number of gold cords representing the seniority of the officer. Other branches of the Austrian Army used a system of waist-sashes and collar stars to distinguish commissioned rank.

Austrian knots soon appeared as part of the distinctive uniform of hussar regiments in the armies of other European nations but did not gain wider popularity until the last decades of the nineteenth century. First the French army, then the Dutch, Romanian, Japanese, Turkish and several Latin American armies adopted this insignia to distinguish officer ranks. British officers of most regiments wore Austrian knots of a simplified pattern in gold braid on the cuffs of their full-dress tunics until this order of uniform ceased to be generally worn after 1914.

Along with most other elaborate and conspicuous indicators of rank, Austrian knots fell into disuse during the First World War and were not revived in everyday wear. An exception was the French Army where the kepis still worn by most officers have Austrian knots in cruciform pattern on the top crown. French officers of North African regiments such as the zouaves and the Algerian tirailleurs continued to wear Austrian knots in gold braid on the sleeves of their colourful full-dress uniforms until 1939. They are still worn on some parade uniforms in France, where they are called nœuds hongrois ("Hungarian knots").

== United States usage ==
During the American Civil War, Confederate officers often wore gold Austrian knots on their uniforms. More elaborate braiding indicated higher rank. This type of insignia was worn by officers of the US Army on the sleeves of the blue full-dress uniforms authorised until 1917. It is a feature of the blue mess-dress uniform adopted as optional wear for officers in 1937 and still worn for formal social or evening functions.

== See also ==
- Frog (fastening) – decorative fastener which originated from China and was adopted in the military clothing of Western countries.
