= Under officer =

Commonwealth military rank

Under officer is an appointment held by the most senior Officer cadets at some Commonwealth officer training establishments such as the Royal Military Academy Sandhurst and in University Officers' Training Corps in the United Kingdom.

It is also a cadet rank used in some Commonwealth youth cadet forces, where it is typically the most senior rank a cadet can hold. In cadet forces it is commonly styled cadet under officer.

== Australia ==
The Royal Military College, Duntroon uses the appointments of senior under officer and under officer for senior staff cadets.

In the Australian Army Cadets and Australian Air Force Cadets, the rank of cadet under officer is the highest cadet rank. They are saluted and addressed as "Sir" or "Ma'am" by their cadet subordinates, but not by adult officers or instructors or members of the Australian Defence Force.

AAC cadet under officers may be assigned as national, regional, or battalion under officer, as quartermaster, or as the commander of a company or platoon. The rank badge is a lozenge, which contains 26 3/2 chevrons. The national cadet under officer has red in the centre of the lozenge. Regional cadet under officers have blue in the centre of the lozenge. AAFC cadet under officers can only be assigned squadron-level appointments, such as squadron warrant officer, or chief instructor.

To become a cadet under officer, a cadet must have completed the senior leaders course module two, otherwise known as the CUO/WO course, often held either at a mid or end of year session. The course runs for one week on a military base, and during this course a prospective cadet under officer will learn platoon and company level command. To gain entry to the course the cadet must have successfully completed the senior leaders course module one or the sergeant course, which entitles them to bear ranks up to staff sergeant.

The insignia for an Australian Air Force Cadets (AAFC) cadet under officer is a thick white stripe.

To achieve the rank of cadet under officer, an AAFC cadet sergeant, cadet flight sergeant or cadet warrant officer must complete the cadet under officer course, which typically takes three weeks at a Royal Australian Air Force base in their home state. Upon successful completion of the cadet under officer course, cadet under officers are given full officer privileges, which includes the right to use the officers' mess on military establishments.

Under officer rank slides
Australian Air Force Cadets cadet under officer

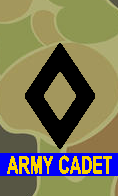
Australian Army Cadets cadet under officer

== India ==
The Indian National Cadet Corps appoints one senior under officer and three junior under officers in every company. The Indian Military Academy and Officers Training Academy gentlemen cadets have similar appointments.

Ranks and Insignias of the National Cadet Corps
Army wing		
Army wing	Cadet Senior Under Officer (CSUO)	Cadet Junior Under Officer (CJUO)
Air force wing		
Air force wing	Cadet Senior Under Officer (CSUO)	Cadet Under Officer (CUO)

== New Zealand ==
Under officer (UO) was also a rank in the New Zealand Air Training Corps and the New Zealand Cadet Corps. In 2012, the rank was also introduced into the New Zealand Sea Cadet Corps, replacing master cadet. It ranked between cadet warrant officer and ensign NZCF, pilot officer NZCF or second lieutenant NZCF, thus making it the highest rank a cadet could reach, although not actually itself a cadet rank. Under officers were normally aged between 17 and 21, and to be eligible for a commission one had to be at least 20 years of age. Under officers were cadets who had received the necessary training and had the desire to become NZCF officers. Hence, under officers were treated as understudy officers. There were two under officers' courses run each year. They performed roles similar to commissioned officers, but did not have the same legal responsibilities and were not saluted, but were addressed as "Sir" or "Ma'am". Cadet under officers wore insignia similar to that worn by officer cadets, except that the thin blue braid was replaced by a piece of NCO chevron cloth. This emphasised their official status as cadets rather than adult leaders.

To become an under officer, cadets were required to:

- Spend 6 months at the minimum rank of staff sergeant/flight sergeant
- Have completed at least three years of cadet Forces training
- Have successfully completed the senior NCO course
- Be at least 17 years of age
- Have the desire, commitment and potential to become an NZCF officer
- Be recommended by their unit commander and have the approval of AC CFTSU.

One of the more commonly used locations for the under officer course was the Royal New Zealand Police College, located in Porirua. This location presented the opportunity for NZCF students and staff to interact with the New Zealand Police and use their equipment. The last RNZPC course was held on 20–29 January 2017. The last under officer course was held at RNZAF Woodbourne on 6–15 July 2018.

Consultation for the potential removal of the rank began in 2018 with the area warrant officers talking to under officers and warrant officers around the country to seek opinions regarding how under officers were utilised on a local level. NZCF officers who had recently been UOs were also polled for an opinion. The result of that was that, in 2019, HQ NZCF announced their intention to remove the rank completely from service, to be replaced by the officer cadet rank. The officer cadet rank had traditionally been used solely on commissioning courses to give personnel a shared rank and equalise personnel from the two different methods of commissioned (serving cadets and direct entry personnel).

In 2020, the rank of under officer was disestablished and its responsibilities passed on to the rank of officer cadet, which changed the purpose of officer cadet from being an intermediate rank given to those on NZCF commissioning courses. In April 2021, the last under officer graduated from the NZCF Officer Commissioning Course. The rank of officer cadet is now given to all personnel who are intending to commission into the NZCF, giving direct entry candidates the opportunity to practise being in uniform before attending the course.

Under officer rank slides
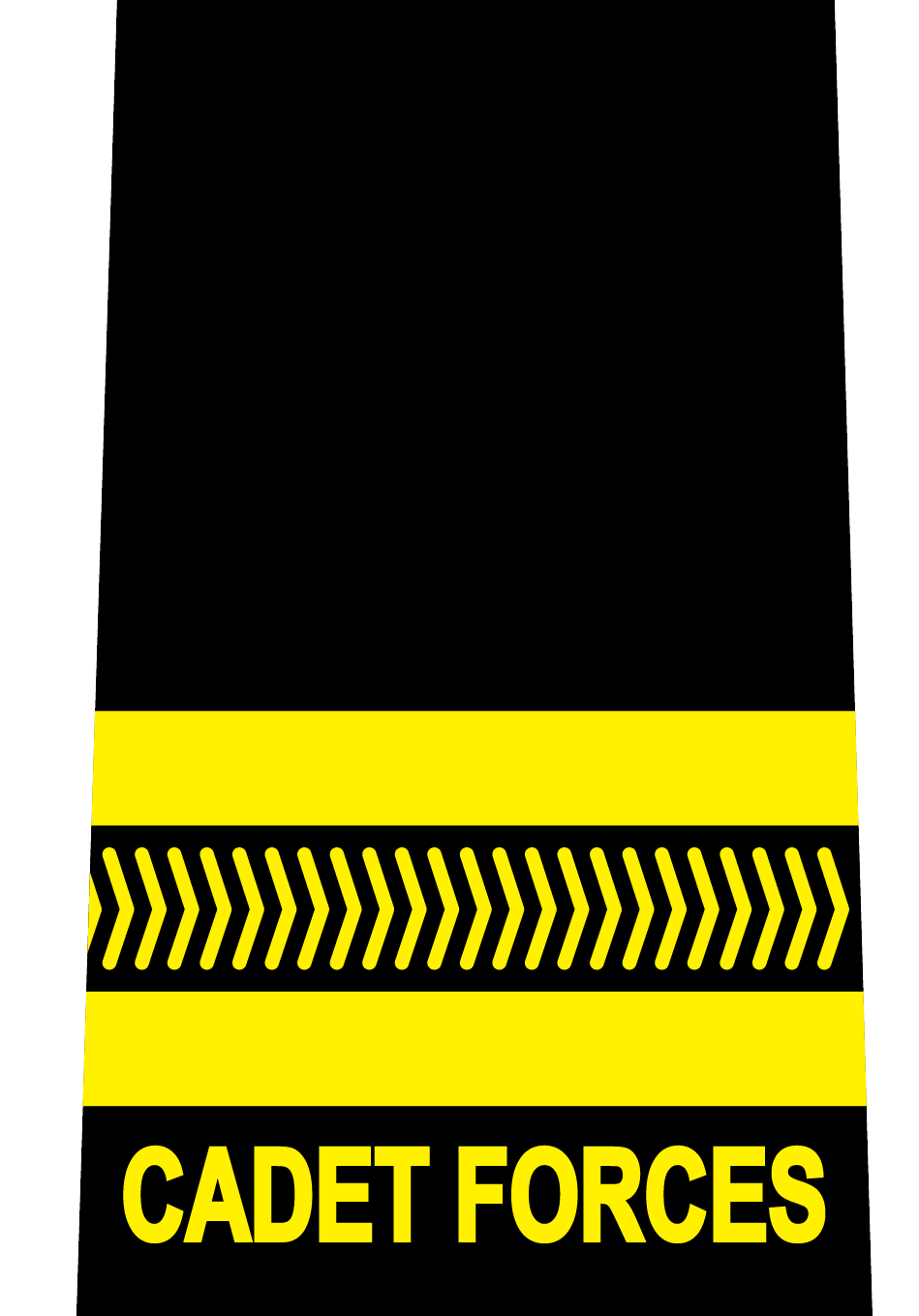
New Zealand Sea Cadet Corps under officer

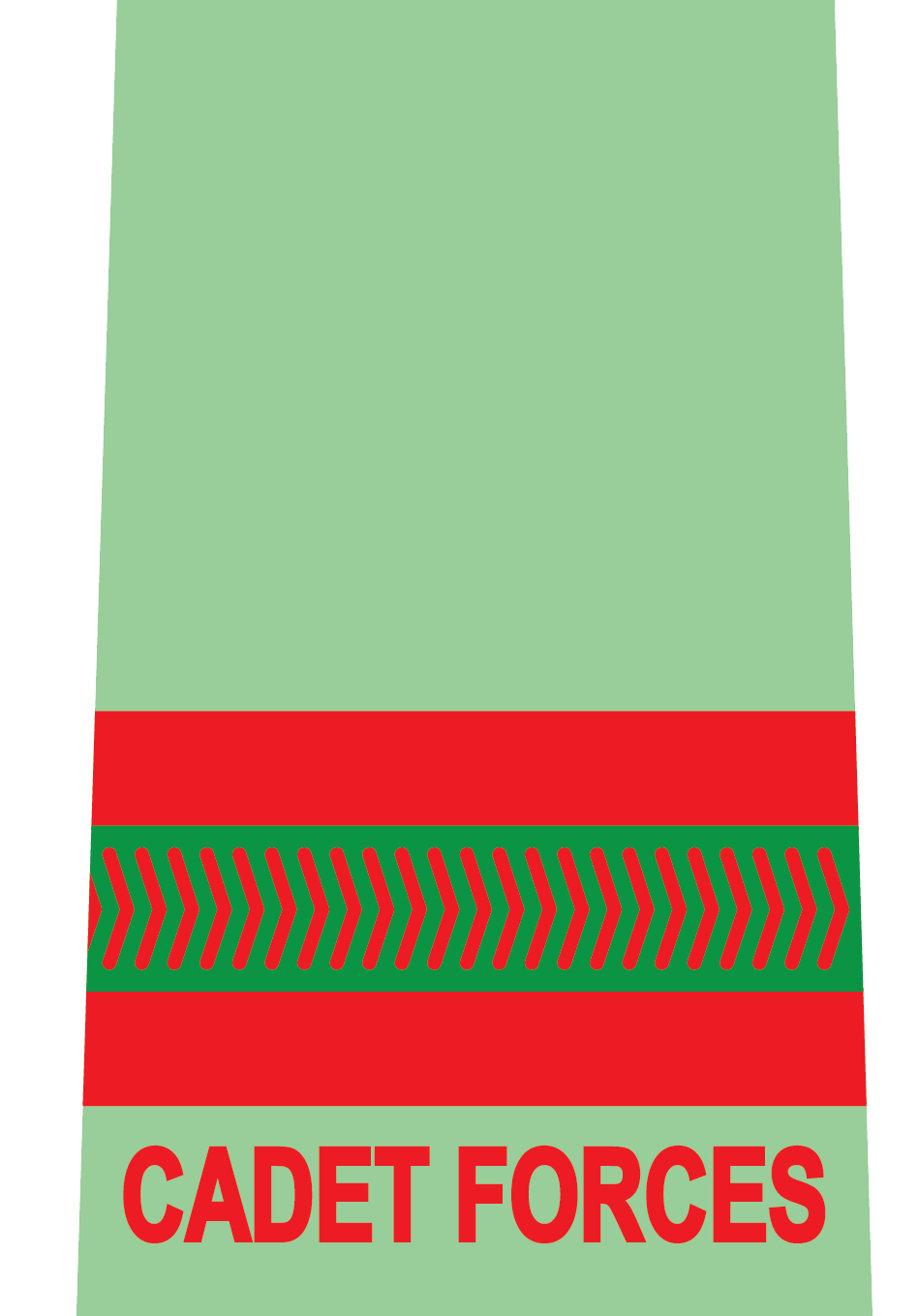
New Zealand Cadet Corps under officer

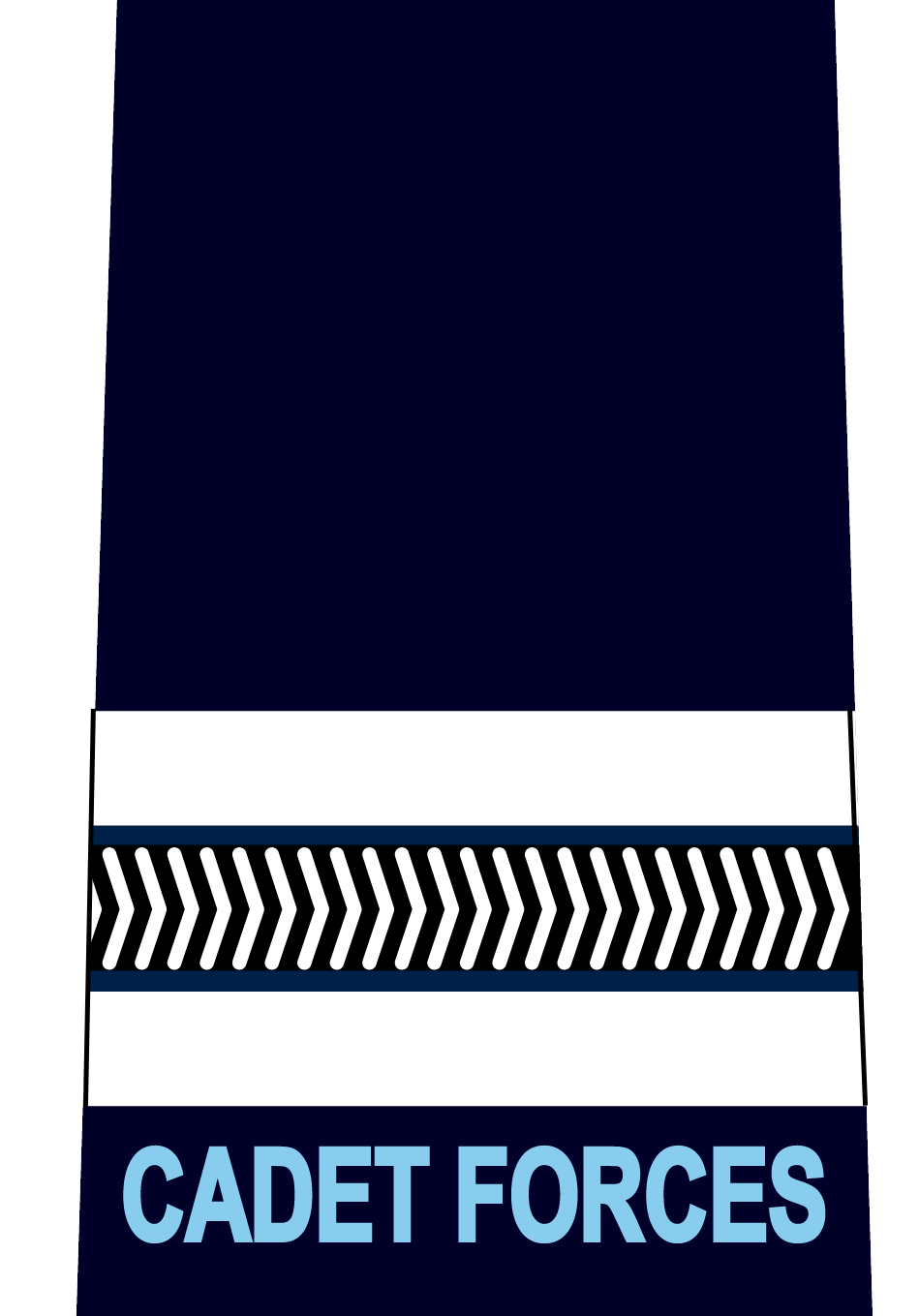
New Zealand Air Training Corps under officer

== Pakistan ==
The Army Medical College uses the appointments of company senior under officer and company junior under officer for senior cadets of each of the six companies, and two appointments of battalion senior under officer and battalion junior under officer.

== United Kingdom ==
Under officer is an appointment in the British Army, held by senior Officer Cadets at the Royal Military Academy Sandhurst (RMAS) and in the University Officers' Training Corps (UOTC). There are usually two separate appointments: junior under officer (JUO) and senior under officer (SUO). The appointment of company under officer (CUO) sits between these two appointments, but is only used at some larger UOTC units. They are usually addressed as "JUO" or "SUO" as appropriate, but are not saluted as they do not hold the King's commission and their rank formally remains officer cadet. RMAS typically appoints two JUOs per platoon in the final term of the commissioning course. At RMAS and in the UOTCs, under officers wear an Austrian knot above a varying number of bars on their rank slide to denote seniority.

=== MOD Sponsored Cadet Forces ===
Cadet under officer is the highest rank that can be held by cadets in the Combined Cadet Force and Army Cadet Force. Unlike in the British Army, cadet under officer is a rank in the cadet forces rather than an appointment. The use of the term in CCF contingents is inconsistent. The ACF has the single appointment of cadet under officer. The rank badge is a white bar on the rank slide.

=== Under officer insignia ===
Under officer rank insignia
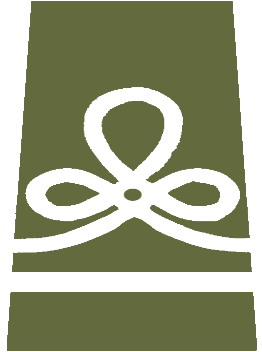
Royal Military Academy Sandhurst junior under officer

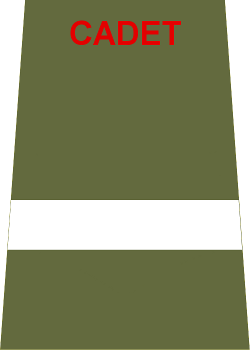
Army Cadet Force cadet under officer

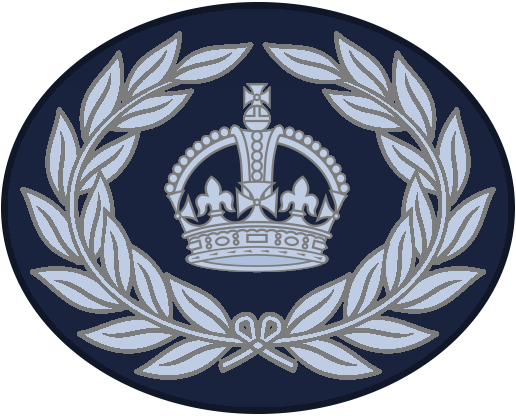
Women's Auxiliary Air Force under officer
