= South African Sea Cadets =

South African youth organization

- Active: 1969 — present
- Country: South Africa
- Type: Non-profit organization
- Role: Youth cadet program Sea cadets
- Size: 300+ members 11 land-based training ships
- Mottos: Honour and Skill
- Website: https://seacadets.za.org

Commanders
- Current commander: Captain (SCC) Paul Jacobs

The South African Sea Cadets is a nonprofit, non-governmental youth organization which comprises sea cadets, aged 12–18, and adult volunteer officers. The organization was known as the South African Sea Cadet Corps from 1969 to 1997. The SASC has been fully integrated in race and gender since the end of Apartheid, and despite its demilitarization is authorized access to South African Navy bases and facilities for training purposes. Cadet membership requires active participation in school, and the mission statement of the organization is primarily to provide maritime training, job experience, and discipline to the youth of South Africa.

The SASC is composed of eleven units as of 2025, which are called training ships. Despite the prenominal lettering ‘TS’ and subsequent naming, these locations are not seagoing vessels, but rather replica facilities created to teach maritime concepts on land. Each unit follows a military-style chain of command, complete with rank structures and insignia, and has an adult officer responsible.

The SASC represents South Africa in the International Sea Cadet Association, alongside similar national organizations like the USNSCC, Sea Cadets (UK), and Australian Navy Cadets.

== History ==
In 1894 the Marist Brothers boys’ school in Johannesburg established a naval cadet group, which would serve once as an honorary color guard for Paul Kruger, then State President of the Transvaal Republic, before disbanding at the onset of the Second Boer War.

A different youth club, the “Woodstock Boys Naval Brigade,” educated in sailing from an ex-mariner, was formed in 1904. In 1905 the unit would expand and be renamed the “Cape Town Naval Cadet Corps”, to encompass all of the city. On June 8th, 1905, the Corps conducted a public parade, and was subsequently allocated a training base and uniforms by Admiral Sir John Durnford; from that day forward the sea cadet movement in South Africa was considered ‘official’.

In 1969, changes in defense policy required out-of-school units to dissolve or integrate with school-based ones. As such, six non-academic cadet formations from around the nation were amalgamated with the pre-existing ‘Navy League’ to finally form a centralized service– the South African Sea Cadet Corps. This name would survive until 1997, when the word ‘corps’ was removed, making the organization the South African Sea Cadets.

== Operations ==
=== Mid-year training camp ===
During school break, cadets of the SASC have the option to participate in a two-week long summer camp. The curriculum typically includes military drill, physical fitness, communications, seamanship, first aid and firefighting. The 2023 iteration had 86 youth participants and was hosted at navy base SAS Saldanha, with a visit to the Castle of Good Hope.

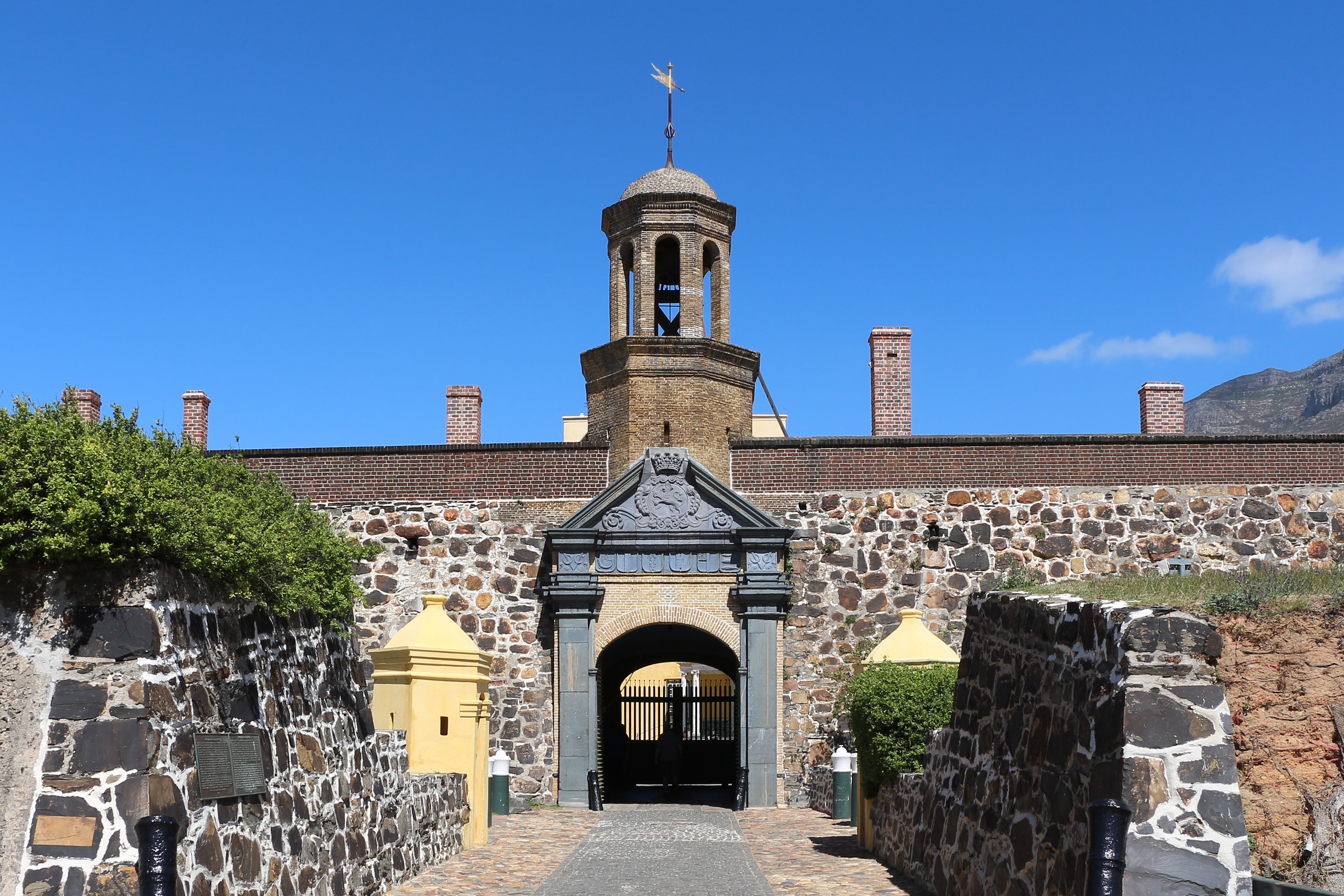
The gates to the Castle of Good Hope, which the sea cadets marched through during their 2023 summer camp.

=== Land activities ===
Training ships of the SASC meet weekly, every Friday or Saturday evening, and teach the same core concepts of seamanship, character and discipline, among others. In 2018, students from the University of Cape Town learned rowing and participated in an obstacle course hosted by members of TS Woltemade; members of the TS Tiburon practiced maritime survival skills.

Sea cadets may also participate in public drill performances and parades – for events like Armed Forces Day – with equipment such as drill rifles and drums. In 2017 cadets participated in a wreath-laying ceremony to commemorate the 100th anniversary of the sinking of the SS Mendi and other South African vessels.

=== Awards and decorations ===
The SASC recognizes select exemplary cadets with annual awards. The Sea Cadet Ambassador award is given for community outreach and accomplishments, and the Overall Cadet of the Year award is given for general commitment and success. The organization’s highest decoration is the ‘Meritorious award’, which is bestowed by the Chairman of the Board of Directors. The award features a military-styled medal with a tricolor ribbon of red, white, and blue.

== Adult leadership ==
The SASC’s youth operations are run by adult volunteers with honorary officer ranks, parallel to those of the navy, which are on average only as high as Commander. As such, the ranks available for most adult officers are Ensign, Sub-lieutenant, Lieutenant, and Lieutenant Commander, in order of least to greatest authority. Officers are to be instructed in drill, ceremonies, etiquette, and professionalism, like their cadet counterparts, and may attend weekend training courses to improve upon the aforementioned.

Nationally, the organization is led by a 'ceremonial warrant officer,' and one ‘Senior Officer Sea Cadets,’ (SOSC), ranking Captain. The incumbent SOSC was Captain (SCC) Paul Jacobs as of 2022.

== List of active training ships ==
As of 2025, the following land-based units were active within the SASC:

Name	Location	Established	Commander	Notes
TS Woltemade	Cape Town	1905	Lieutenant G. Jacobs	Formed from a school’s disbanded naval cadet program, the unit reportedly had over 150 cadets as of 2018.
TS Tiburon	Durban	1916	Ensign K. Govender	
TS Springs	Springs and Brakpan	1916	Lieutenant Commander C. Hand	
TS Lanherne	Port Elizabeth	1935	Lieutenant G. van Staden	Largest unit, with over 150 cadets
TS Bounty	Vereeniging	1949	Sub-lieutenant W. Cooke	Possesses a boathouse on the Vaal River and a swimming pool
TS Outeniqua	Mossel Bay	1985	Unknown	
TS Knysna	Knysna	1989	Lieutenant C. Lamini	
TS Rook	Krugersdorp	2015	Lieutenant L. Spencer	Unit of the Year for 2022
TS Birkenhead	Hawston	Unknown	Lieutenant N.M. Dreyer	
TS Saldanha	Saldanha	Unknown	Sub-lieutenant R. Arends	
TS Prince Alfred	Port Alfred	Unknown	Ensign C. Nelson	
