= List of Training Ships in the New Zealand Sea Cadet Corps =

This is a list of units in the New Zealand Sea Cadet Corps.

As of 2025 there are 15 Sea Cadet Corps Training Ships in New Zealand.

== Map of New Zealand Training Ships Units ==

Training Ships of the New Zealand Sea Cadet Corps

== List of New Zealand Sea Cadet Corps Training Ships ==
Abbrv.	Ship	Town / City	Region	Area	Coordinates	Unit Colours	Unit Recognition Patch	HMNZS Sponsor	Commissioned	Website and Notes
DIO	TS Diomede	Whangārei	Northland	Northern Area	35°43′45″S 174°20′06″E	Green		HMNZS Taupo	Unknown	
BEL	TS Bellona	Hobsonville	Auckland	Northern Area	36°47′16″S 174°39′59″E	Red			5 August 1983 (42 years ago)	
LEA	TS Leander	North Shore	Auckland	Northern Area	36°48′59″S 174°48′21″E	Blue and Gold			18 August 1960 (65 years ago)	
	Hibiscus Coast Sea Cadets	Hibiscus Coast	Auckland	Northern Area	36°39′27″S 174°39′10″E				Formed December 2023 (2 years ago)	Currently a part of 5SQN ATC (Rodney District) as this unit has not been recognised.
ACH	TS Achilles	Auckland City	Auckland	Northern Area	36°50′55″S 174°49′06″E	Red		HMNZS Te Kaha	11 April 1964 (61 years ago)	
GBA	TS Gambia	Otahuhu	Auckland	Northern Area	36°56′03″S 74°51′46″E			HMNZS Te Kaha	May 1967 (58 years ago)	
WKO	TS Waikato	Hamilton	Waikato	Northern Area	37°46′50″S 175°16′26″E	Yellow and black		HMNZS Te Kaha	Unknown	Formerly TS Rangiriri
CHA	TS Chatham	Tauranga	Bay of Plenty	Northern Area	37°39′35″S 176°10′08″E	Purple		HMNZS Te Kaha	Unknown	
AHU	TS Ahuriri	Napier	Hawke's Bay	Central Area	39°29′02″S 176°55′11″E				2 September 2020 (5 years ago)	
CAL	TS Calliope	Wanganui	Manawatū-Whanganui	Central Area	39°56′13″S 175°02′49″E			HMNZS Aotearoa	Unknown	
TAM	TS Tamatoa	Petone	Wellington	Central Area	41°13′39″S 74°52′26″E			HMNZS Wellington	1945 (80 years ago)	
AMO	TS Amokura	Wellington	Wellington	Central Area	41°18′17″S 174°48′05″E			HMNZS Wellington	1963 (62 years ago)	Archived
TAL	TS Talisman	Nelson	Nelson	Southern Area	41°16′25″S 173°17′16″E			HMNZS Pukaki	9 May 1961 (64 years ago)	Archived
GOD	TS Godley	Christchurch	Canterbury	Southern Area	43°31′20″S 172°37′49″E			HMNZS Canterbury	2015 (10 years ago)	Formerly TS Cornwell and TS Steadfast. These units were merged in the aftermath of the 2011 Christchurch Earthquake
	TS Royalist	Timaru	Canterbury	Southern Area	44°20′58″S 171°13′51″E				nil	Currently a part of 15SQN District of Timaru as this unit has not been recognised.
NEP	TS Neptune	Dunedin	Otago	Southern Area	45°52′24″S 170°30′38″E				December 2024 (1 year ago)	

== Former Training Ships ==
Ship	Town / City	Area	Coordinates	Unit Recognition Patch	Commissioned	Date of Disbandment	Website and Notes
TS Waireka	Dunedin	Southern Area	45°52′24″S 170°30′38″E		Unknown	2024	Amalgamated to create TS Neptune
TS Nimrod	Port Chalmers	Southern Area	45°49′09″S 170°37′27″E		1966	2024 (58 years)	Archived Amalgamated to create TS Neptune
TS Endeavour	Gisborne	Central Area	38°40′54″S 178°01′49″E			2007	
TS Tutira	Levin	Central Area	45°49′09″S 170°37′27″E		July 23, 1963	2020 (58 years)	Archived
TS Steadfast	Christchurch	Southern Area	43°36′08″S 172°41′34″E		21 October 1929	2012 (83 years)	First Sea Cadet Unit; Amalgamated to Create TS Godley
TS Cornwell	Christchurch	Southern Area	43°36′08″S 172°41′34″E		1958	2012 (54 years)	Amalgamated to Create TS Godley
TS Taupo	Mana	Central Area	41°05′57″S 174°51′57″E			2025	Assimilated into TS Amokura
St. Patrick's College Unit Sea Cadet Corps	Wellington	Central Area					
Wanganui Unit Sea Cadet Corps	Wanganui	Central Area					
Nelson College Unit, Sea Cadet Corps	Nelson	Southern Area					
Tauranga Unit Sea Cadet Corps	Tauranga	Northern Area					
Rotorua Boys' High School Sea Cadet Corps	Rotorua	Northern Area					

== See also ==
- New Zealand Sea Cadet Corps
- New Zealand Cadet Forces
