= Sea Cadet Association of New Zealand =

The Sea Cadet Association of New Zealand traces its roots back to 1929 when the first open Sea Cadet unit was formed in Christchurch, by the Canterbury Navy League. Units formed in the four main centres and were controlled nationally by the Canterbury branch of the League. The Navy League continued to manage these open community Sea Cadet units even when they came under the control of the Royal New Zealand Navy (RNZN).

Since then the New Zealand Sea Cadet Corps has come under the joint control of the government, represented by the RNZN and the community, represented by the Sea Cadet Association of New Zealand. Each of the three areas (Northern, Central and Southern) have their own SCANZ board and advisers from the Navy. The Sea Cadets also come under the ultimate control of the Commandant of Cadet Forces.

Sea Cadets in New Zealand have recently become more involved with their sister corps, the New Zealand Cadet Corps (Army Flavour) and the Air Training Corps (Air Force Flavour) and now run joint promotion courses held at Defence Force bases around the country. Only the annual Sailing Course and Sailing Regattas have remained Sea Cadet Only.

Each of the three areas have their own annual Sailing Regatta and every four years the entire country comes together for National Regatta. All 17 units come together to compete for the ribbon which will show that they are the number one unit in the country. This title currently belongs to TS Steadfast, Christchurch (winners of the 2010 National Regatta). TS Amokura, despite their unit burning down late 2005, competed in the Central Area Regatta 2006 and almost clean swept all the prizes.

== See also ==
- New Zealand Sea Cadet Corps
- Sea Cadets (national Sea Cadet organisations)
- International Sea Cadet Association
- New Zealand Cadet Forces
