= Navy League of New Zealand =

Navy League of New Zealand is a maritime organisation established in 1896 in New Zealand.

== Navy League of New Zealand Branches ==
As of 2012 there are five constituent branches of Navy League of New Zealand:

- Navy League Northland
- Navy League Auckland
- Navy League Wellington
- Navy League Nelson
- Navy League Canterbury

== Purpose & Objects ==
The Navy League in New Zealand has a number of general goals or objectives. The primary one is the support and development of the Sea Cadet Corps.

== Activities ==
=== Navy League Auckland ===
The Auckland Navy League branch supports and funds a regatta (known as The Navy League Regatta) for the four Auckland Sea Cadet Units (TS Achilles (Central City), TS Bellona (Hobsonville), TS Gambia (Otahuhu), and TS Leander (Devonport)).

=== Navy League Canterbury ===
- The John Pallot Memorial Scholarship was established to recognise a sea cadet in the Christchurch/Canterbury area between 16 and 18 years who has made a significant contribution to their unit and demonstrates leadership potential.
- The Navy League Canterbury Prize in Diplomacy & International Relations is an award to the top student in the BA (Hons) programme in Diplomacy & International Relations at the University of Canterbury.

== Navy League of New Zealand Special Service Medal ==
The Navy League Special Service Medal is awarded by the National Executive for long or exceptional service to the Navy League movement in New Zealand.

== Notable Navy League of New Zealand Members ==
=== Navy League Canterbury ===
- George Laurenson
- Phineas Selig

== See also ==
=== Sea Cadet Corps ===
- New Zealand Sea Cadet Corps
- Sea Cadet Association of New Zealand

=== Navy Leagues ===
- Navy League of Australia
- Navy League of the United States
- Navy League of Canada

=== Events ===
- Trafalgar Day
