= International Sea Cadet Association =

The International Sea Cadet Association (ISCA) is a voluntary association of independent Sea Cadet Corps or corresponding organizations, committed to common concepts and goals, and wishing to share ideas and information, and, to the best of their ability, to engage in cadet exchanges and to provide mutual support in order to promote the benefits of Sea Cadet training worldwide.

== Role ==
The ISCA promotes international co-operation and exchanges between national Sea Cadet Corps and the organisations that support them.

== Constituent Sea Cadet Corps and organisations ==
- Australian Navy Cadets
- Bermuda Sea Cadet Corps
- Deutsche Marine-Jugend e.V. (Sea Cadet Corps of Germany)
- Hong Kong Sea Cadets Corps
- Junior Sea Friends' Federation of Japan
- Sea Cadet Corps of Portugal
- Royal Belgian Sea Cadet Corps
- Sea Cadet Association of New Zealand
- Sea Cadet Corps of India
- Sea Cadet Corps of the United Kingdom
- Sea Explorers of Korea
- Singapore National Cadet Corps (Sea)
- Swedish Sea Cadet Corps
- South African Sea Cadets
- The Navy League of Canada
- Royal Canadian Sea Cadet Corps
- United States Naval Sea Cadet Corps
- Young Mariners League of Russia
- Zeekadetkorps Nederland (Sea Cadet Corps of the Netherlands)
- Zimbabwe Sea Cadet Corps

== See also ==
- Sea Cadets (national Sea Cadet organisations)
