= United States Navy torpedo retrievers =

Naval vessels that retrieve training munitions

Ships of the United States Navy

Ships in current service
- Current ships

Ships grouped alphabetically
- A–B; C; D–F; G–H; I–K; L; M; N–O; P; Q–R; S; T–V; W–Z

Ships grouped by type
- Aircraft carriers; Airships; Amphibious warfare ships; Auxiliaries; Battlecruisers; Battleships; Cruisers; Destroyers; Destroyer escorts; Destroyer leaders; Escort carriers; Frigates; Hospital ships; Littoral combat ships; Mine warfare vessels; Monitors; Oilers; Patrol vessels; Registered civilian vessels; Sailing frigates; Steam frigates; Steam gunboats; Ships of the line; Sloops of war; Submarines; Torpedo boats; Torpedo retrievers; Unclassified miscellaneous; Yard and district craft

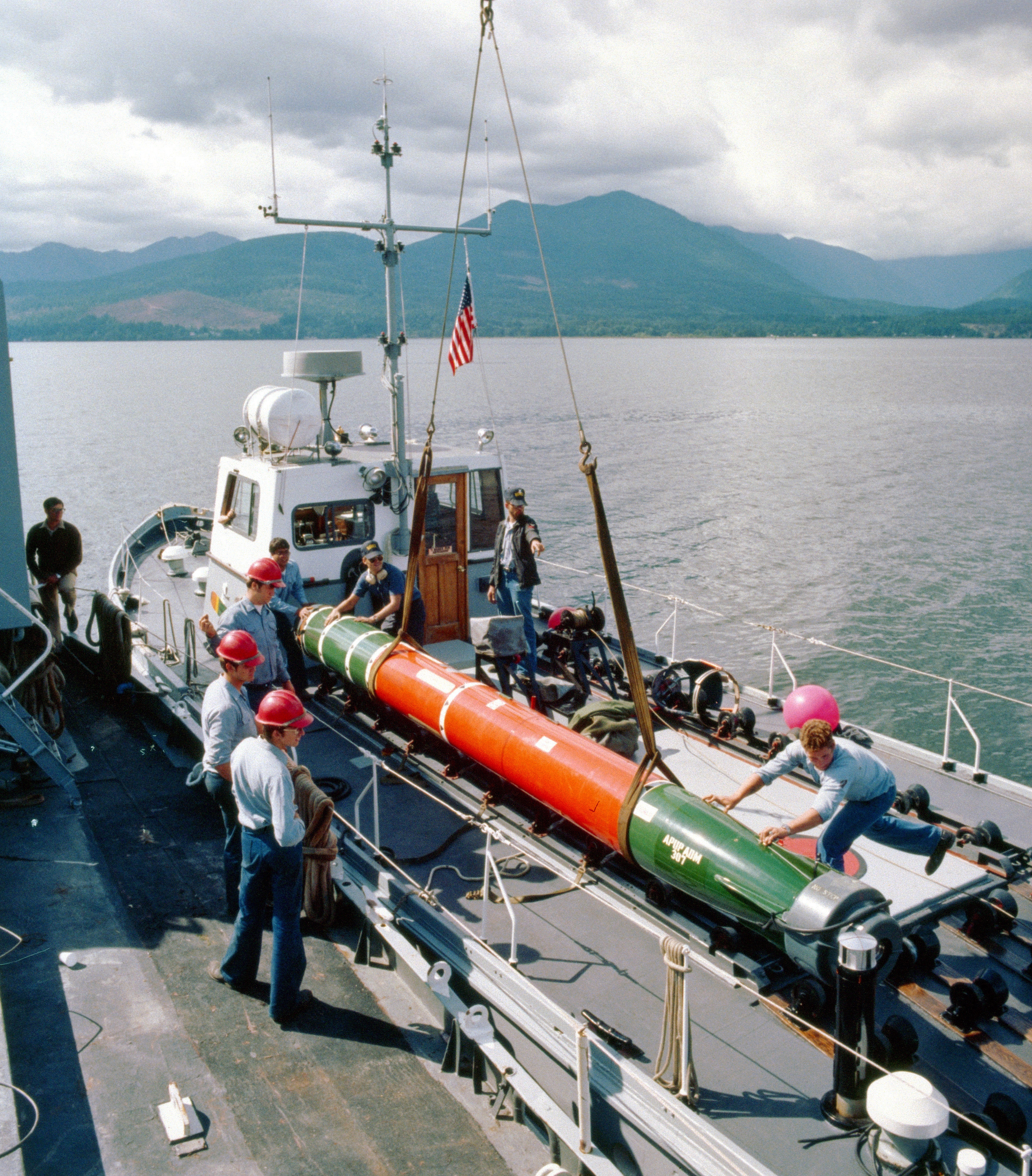
A Mark 48 exercise torpedo is hoisted off a Mark II 72' torpedo recovery boat in 1982.

United States Navy submarines, surface ships, and aircraft launch torpedoes, missiles, and autonomous undersea vehicles as part of training exercises. Typically, these training munitions have no warhead and are recovered from the sea and reused. Similarly, new naval weapons under development are launched at sea in performance trials. These experimental units also need to be recovered, in their case to obtain evaluation data. At various points in history, newly manufactured torpedoes were fired as a quality control measure and these, too, had to be recovered before issuing them to the fleet. The U.S. Navy has used a variety of boats to accomplish the retrieval of these test and training munitions. As their missions evolved over the last century they have been variously known as torpedo retrievers, torpedo weapon retrievers, torpedo recovery boats, range support craft, and multi-purpose craft.

These vessels have usually been confined to firing ranges close to port and have not engaged in combat. The individual service histories of these boats are consequently modest, undramatic, and frequently undocumented. While their individual histories may be lost, as a class they have been part of the Navy for a century and have served around the world. Their modern types remain in service with the Navy today, continuing to provide an essential function.

== History and operation ==
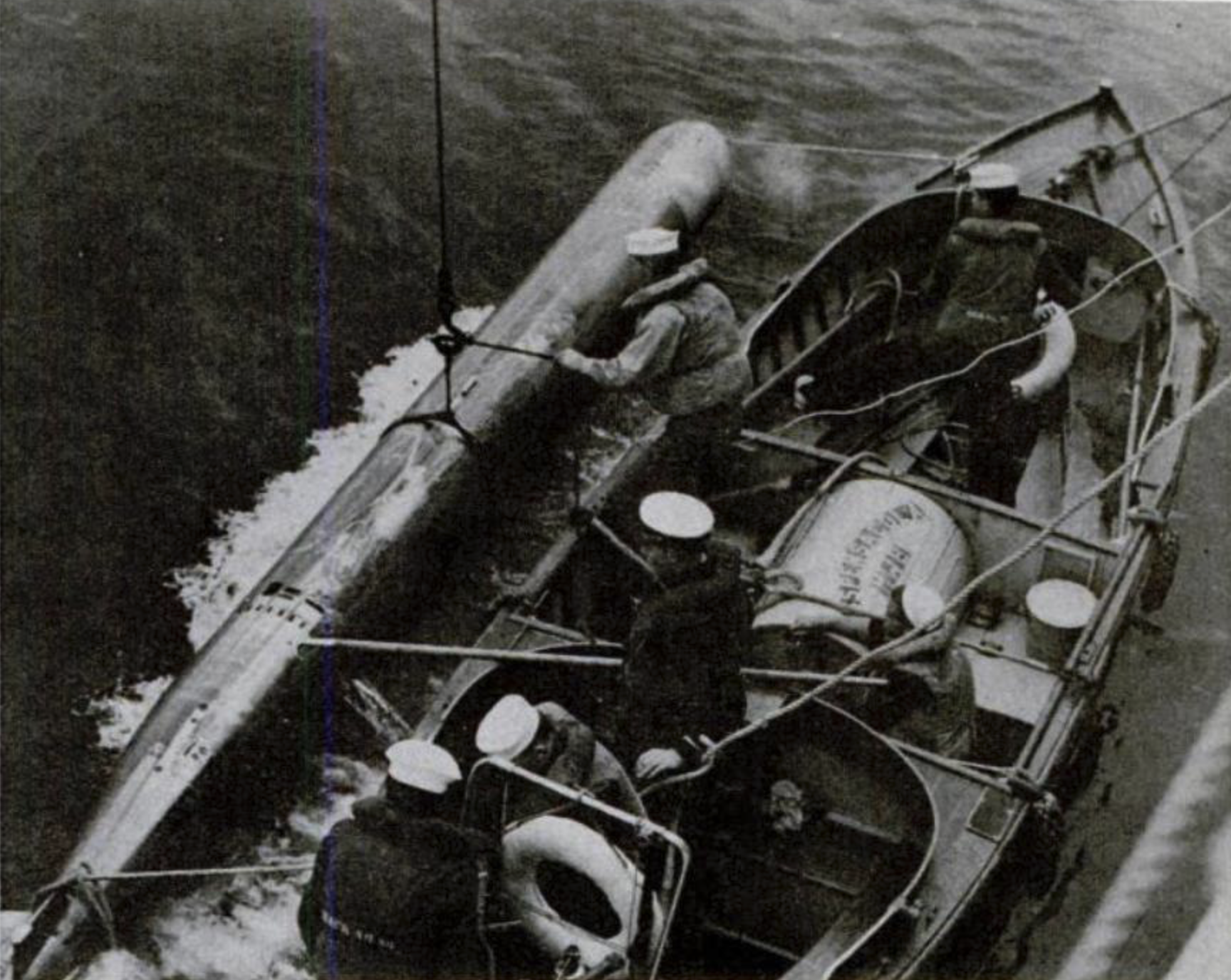
Whaleboat recovering an exercise torpedo. In the absence of torpedo retrievers a wide variety of small boats were pressed into recovery service.

The first sinking of a ship by a self-propelled torpedo occurred in 1878, and by World War I, torpedoes played a pivotal role in naval warfare as German U-boats sought to close the North Atlantic to allied shipping. While the United States had experimented with early torpedoes, the U-boat threat in World War I focused undersea warfare efforts on anti-submarine technologies rather than torpedoes. At the close of World War I, U.S. defense spending was reduced, further curtailing the development of torpedo systems. Consequently, U.S. Navy experience with torpedoes was quite limited prior to World War II. At the start of the conflict there was no one in the Navy who had ever seen or heard a torpedo detonate either in test or war. No U.S. submarine sank a vessel using a torpedo until 1941. In this environment of economy, testing and trainining were limited. Only two types of small purpose-built torpedo retrievers, 40' and 42' boats, were built. There were few enough of these that it was common for unspecialized motorboats to recover exercise torpedoes.

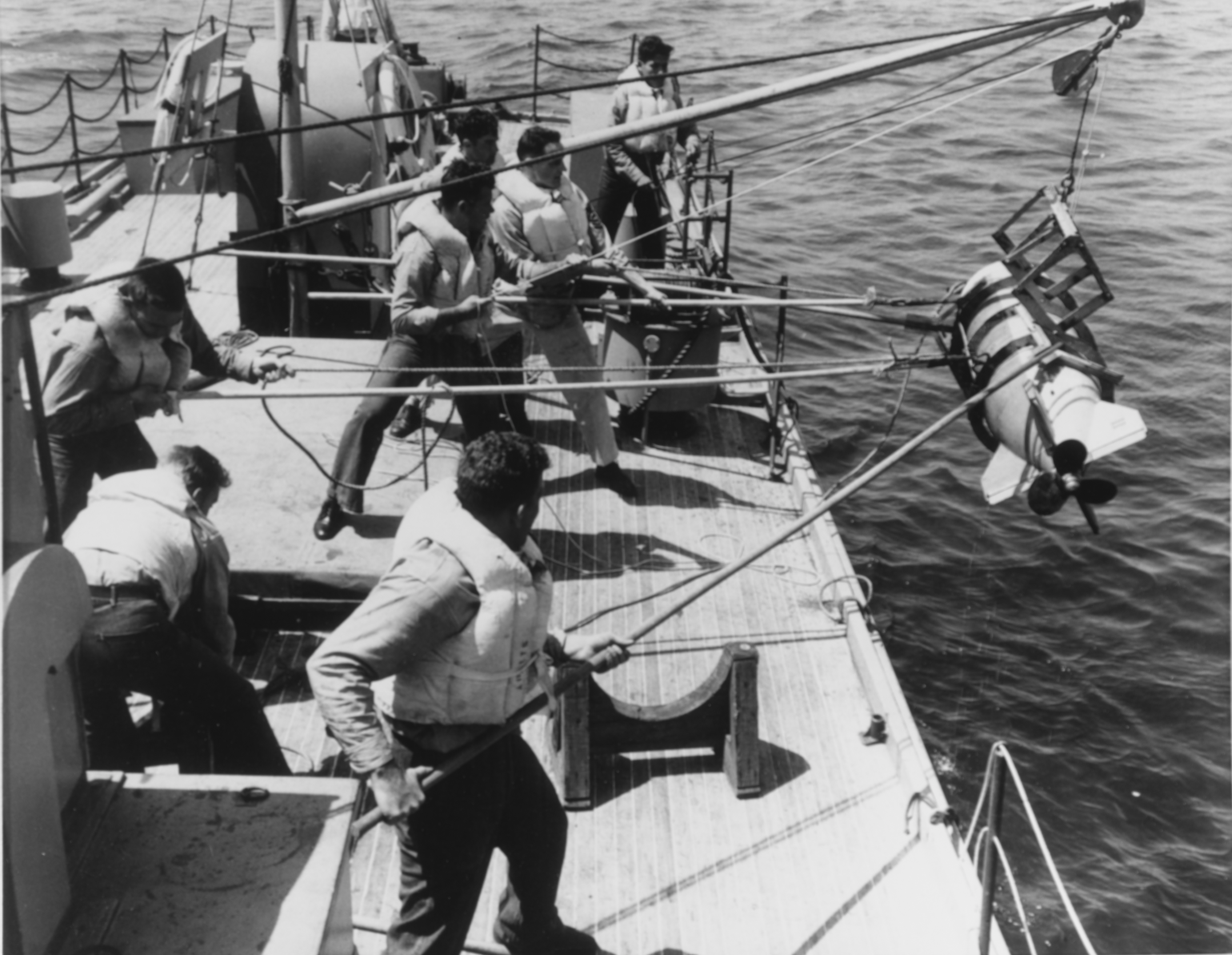
Torpedo retriever crew cranes aboard a Mark 24 "Fido" torpedo in 1950

World War II brought about a large increase in U.S. Navy use of torpedoes. Prior to the war, about 60 torpedoes per month were manufactured. Over the next four years nearly 50,000 were produced. Training and testing capabilities expanded significantly, including new, more capable torpedo retrievers, notably the 63' vessels converted from aviation crash boats. Even so, other small vessels continued to be pressed into service as retrievers. For example, during March 1945 the rescue tug ATR-63 was detailed to retrieve exercise torpedoes off Pearl Harbor five times. Two exercises were aborted due to high winds and seas, and in the other three exercises she recovered 25 torpedoes, including some dropped by aircraft and others fired by submarines USS Cod and USS Cero.

The most recent generations of torpedo retrievers are much more than that, as their designations suggest. They are now categorized as range support craft, and multi-purpose craft. They not only retrieve torpedoes, but new classes of weapons including missiles, and autonomous undersea vehicles. They launch drones and other targets. They tow various targets and lower sound transducers into the sea to simulate enemy vessels. They are capable of extended operation away from port, sailing independently, and have capacity to retrieve many exercise weapons without having to return to base.

For most of their history, torpedo retrievers have been manned by Navy enlisted personnel. A recent development is the outsourcing of operation and maintenance of these vessels. While the Navy continues to own the boats, civilian contractors and crew will run many of them. The Pacific Missile Range Facility, the Southern California Offshore Range, and the Naval Submarine Support Command at Pearl Harbor have all moved toward placing civilian crews aboard their range support craft.

=== Torpedo retrieval techniques ===
Exercise torpedoes are intended to float on the surface when they reach the end of their runs. Various techniques have been used to achieve this. For example, the submarine-launched Mark 14 torpedo of World War II replaced its warhead with an exercise head filled with water. At the end of the torpedo's run, compressed air would expel the water, lightening the weapon sufficiently to float.

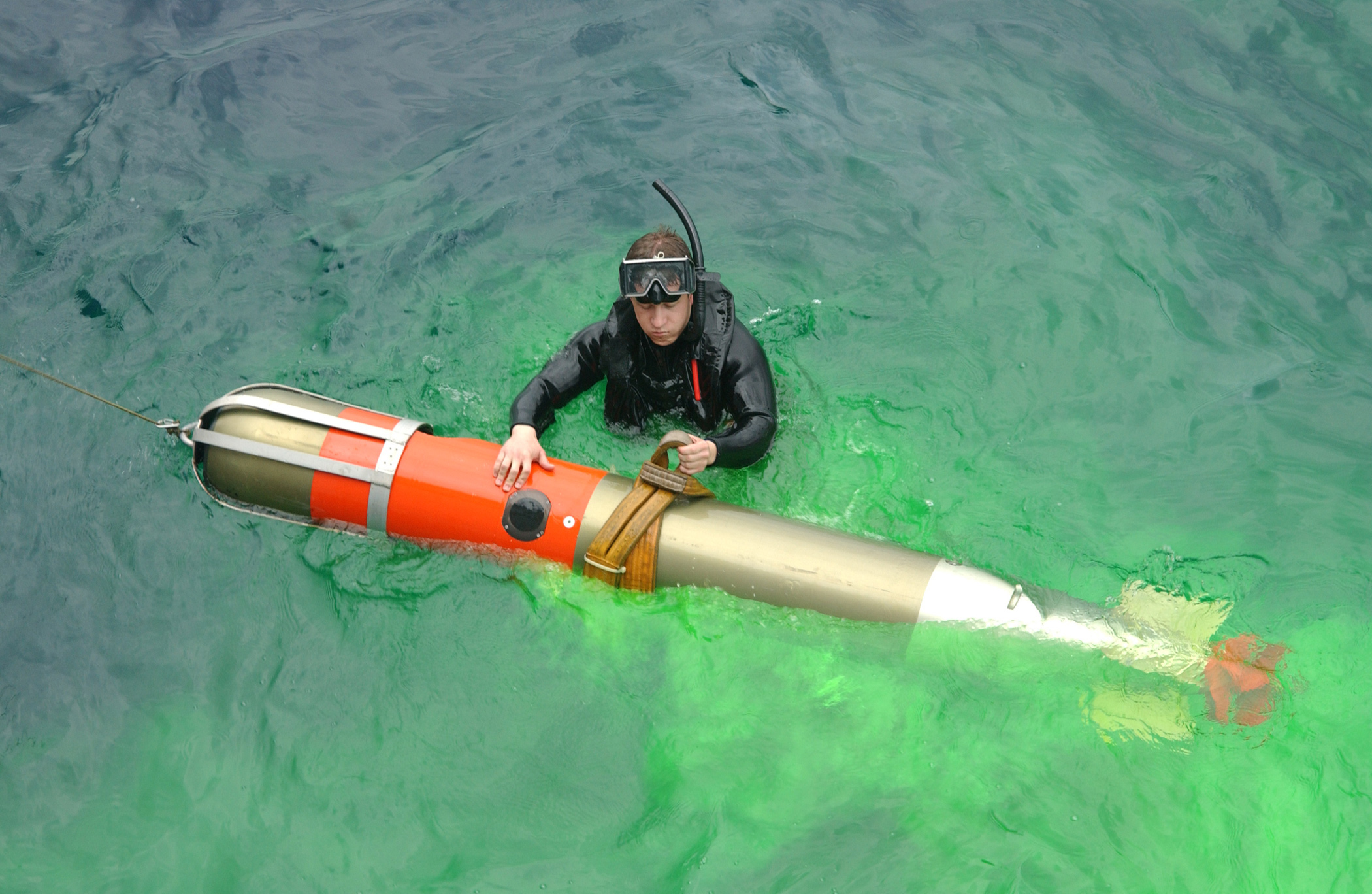
Retrieval of a Mark 46 exercise torpedo. Note the dye, used to locate the weapon, and the wire rope attached to the nose cage to bring the weapon aboard.

In order to recover a floating torpedo it is first necessary to find it. Prior to the advent of electric torpedoes, which first reached the U.S. fleet in September 1943, torpedo recovery boats could follow the stream of bubbles generated by the weapon's propulsion system. Also aiding the retrievers was that early torpedoes were primarily used against surface ships, so they ran at a set, shallow depth. They ran straight, with no ability to change course once fired, making their ultimate destination somewhat predictable. Exercise torpedoes have typically been painted in bright colors, often international orange, to stand out in the water.

Modern torpedoes have electric propulsion systems that leave no trail of bubbles for a retriever to follow. They also rely on homing and other technologies that can change a weapon's course once fired. Further complicating location is that torpedoes are more likely to be used against deep-diving submarines, rather than surface ships, so not only is their course less predictable, but also the depth at which they run. Today, finding spent torpedoes is aided by dye packets that vividly color the sea where they complete their run. Some torpedoes have also been equipped with an electronic end-of-run locator, a "pinger" producing a high-frequency sound that can be detected by hydrophone equipment.

Once a torpedo has been located, the next step in retrieval is to attach a line to it. A variety of snares and slings that encircle the body of the weapon, and various nosepieces have been used to attach lines to the otherwise smooth object. Slings and nose cages have been attached to the weapons either by swimmers, by sailors working from a small boat, or by sailors operating from the torpedo retriever itself.

Having located and captured a spent torpedo, it could now be recovered. The early 40' and 42' torpedo retrievers had no ability to bring a weapon on board. Their crews would snare a floating torpedo, tie a line to it, and tow it to a dock or ship where it could be craned out of the water. In the absence of purpose-built torpedo retrievers, a wide variety of small boats performed similarly. Disadvantages of these early vessels included their inability to operate in difficult sea conditions, to stay on station overnight, to navigate on their own, and to recover more than one torpedo per trip. These early retrievers had no radios. They would communicate by raising a "bravo" signal flag to indicate they were recovering a torpedo. Beginning with the 63' boats and continuing to the present day, all U.S. Navy torpedo retrievers have an inclined aft deck or ramp equipped with rollers that allow torpedoes to be winched aboard directly from the sea. These larger vessels could recover multiple torpedoes before off-loading to a shore facility or ship.

=== Torpedo retriever alternatives ===
Torpedo retriever boats are but one of the ways spent exercise and test weapons have been recovered by the Navy. Malfunctioning torpedoes that sink require different approaches. Divers, nets, grapples, and magnetic detectors have been used to search for lost weapons starting as early as 1919. A descendant of these early methods, recovering munitions as deep as 20,000 feet (6,100 m), were a series of increasingly sophisticated cable-controlled robots called CURV. Beginning in the 1950s, the Navy experimented with training a variety of marine mammals to recover sunken torpedoes. Orca, beluga whales, pilot whales, and bottle-nosed dolphins were all trained with some level of success. As robots became more capable and cheaper, this program was discontinued.

Helicopters are also capable of recovering floating torpedoes using specialized nets, but they suffer from a number of disadvantages compared to torpedo recovery boats. They are in short supply, have limited flight times, are expensive, have limited lifting capacity, and can pick up just a single torpedo per trip.

The United States Air Force has also operated drone and missile retriever boats to support its own training and development requirements and continues to do so to the present day.

== U.S. Navy torpedo retrievers ==
The Navy's rules regarding these non-commissioned vessels have varied over the decades, but for much of their history they were not entitled to an official name or even a pennant number painted on their bow. These nameless vessels have simply been known by their hull number. Unofficial pennant numbers and names have been assigned from time to time at their bases. This has led to historical confusion since vessels with the same unofficial name or pennant number have been in service simultaneously. The vessels described below are listed in order of their introduction to the fleet.

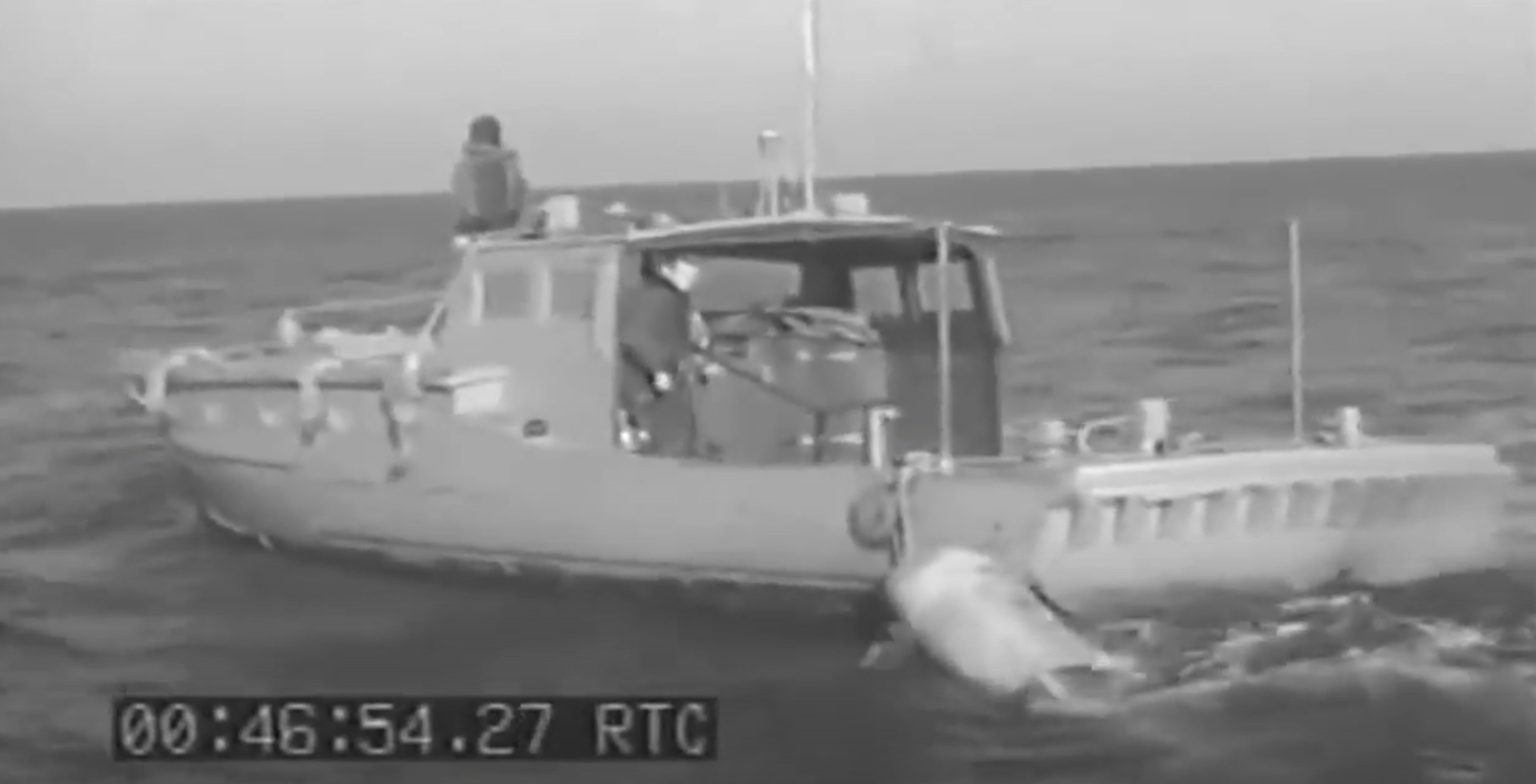
42' torpedo retriever towing an exercise torpedo at the Montauk, New York Naval Torpedo Testing Range in 1944

=== 40' Torpedo retriever ===
The navy built a number of these small, wooden torpedo retrievers as early as 1924. They were driven by twin 150 horsepower Palmer Marine gasoline engines. Many were declared surplus after World War II and sold to the public for prices as low as $250.

=== 42' Torpedo retriever ===
These boats had white cedar hulls framed with oak. After World War II many of these vessels were declared surplus and sold to the public for prices as low as $750. Nonetheless, a few of them served into the 1950s.

=== 63' Torpedo retriever ===
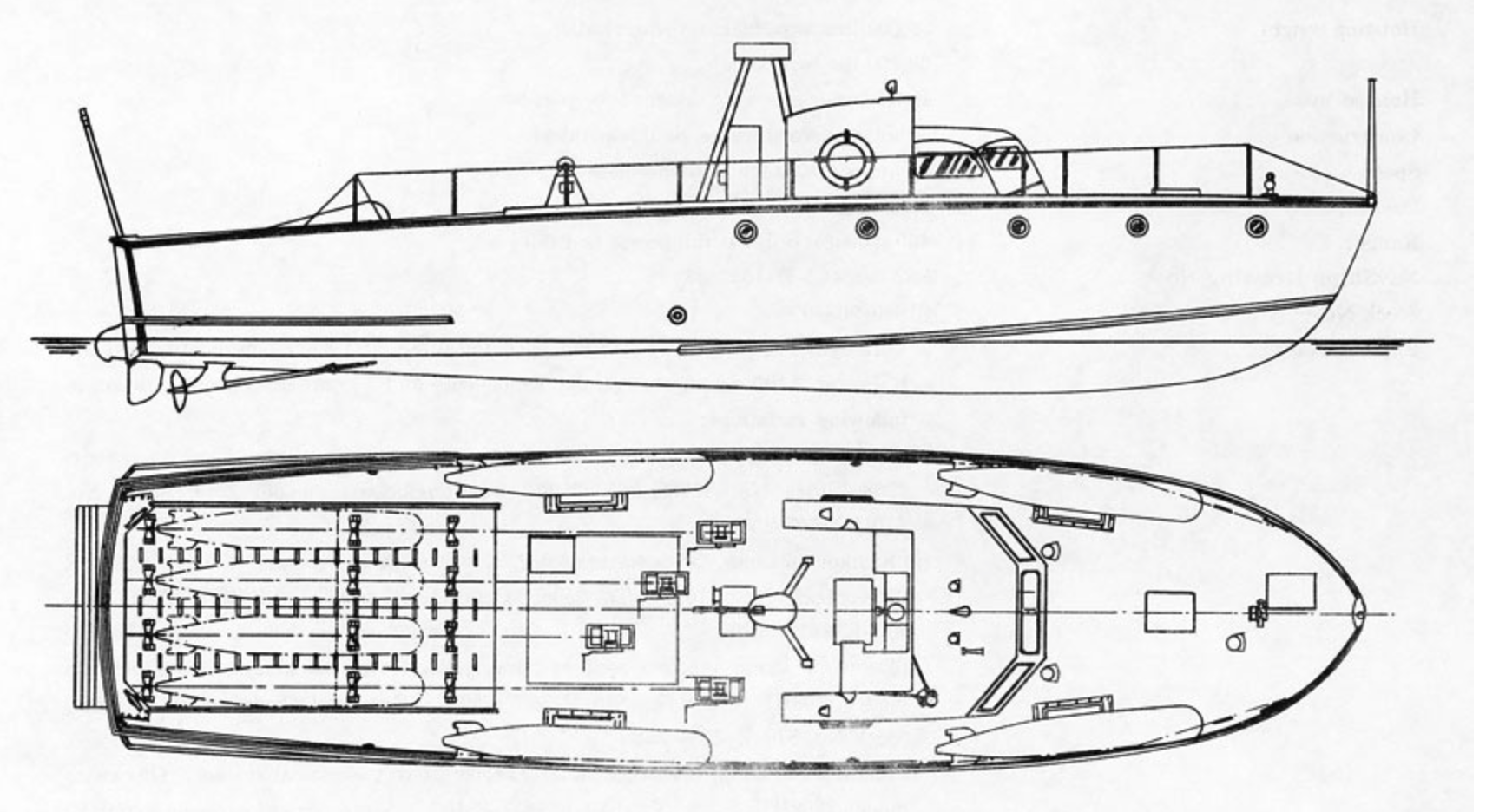
63' Torpedo retriever

This class of torpedo retrievers began as conversions from 63' aviation crash boats, designated auxiliary vessel - rescue (AVR) by the Navy. Their aft cockpits were modified with a ramp down to the water. Hand-cranked winches were installed on deck to haul torpedoes out of the water and onto the ramps. The configuration of these boats varied based on the model of AVR from which they were converted. Some gasoline powered boats could reach 20 knots, while others powered by twin Gray Marine 165 diesel engines, reached a speed of 11 knots. They sailed with a crew of six.

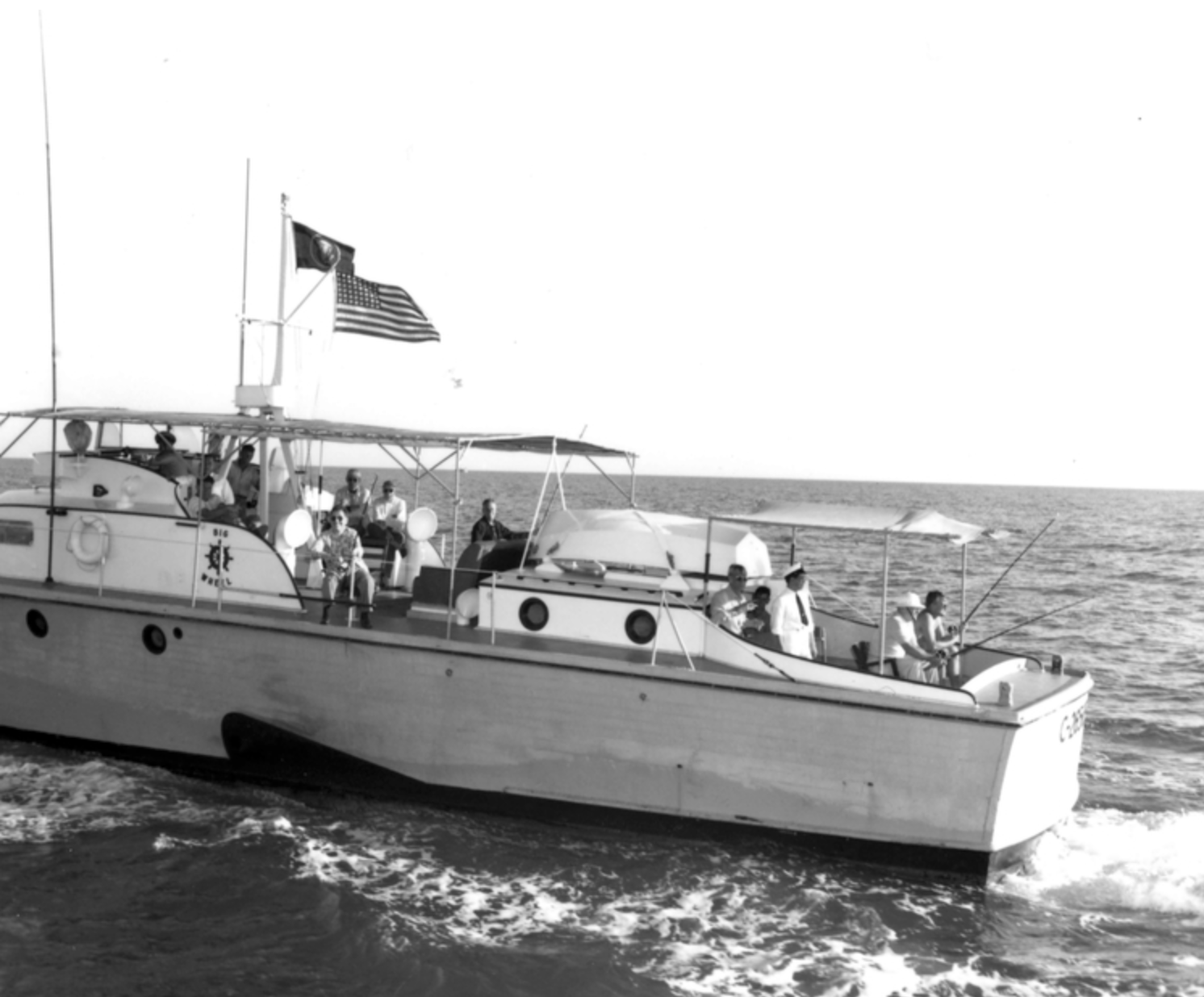
President Truman fishing off Key West on Big Wheel, a converted 63' torpedo retriever in 1949.

One of these vessels was converted into the base fishing boat, Big Wheel, at Naval Station Key West. This former torpedo retriever hosted President Harry S. Truman on fishing trips in 1949 and 1951.

63' Torpedo retrievers
Pennant #	Notes
	One assigned to Naval Station Key West
	Three assigned to Submarine Base Pearl Harbor
	Four were assigned to the Montauk Naval Torpedo Testing Range. In November 1956, one of them, "22", sank in heavy seas between Montauk and Block Island while exercising with USS Becuna, which rescued the torpedo retriever's crew.
TRB-8	Assigned to the Long Beach Sea Range, a detachment of the Naval Ordnance Test Station.
TRB-9	Assigned to the Long Beach Sea Range, a detachment of the Naval Ordnance Test Station.
TRB-11	Assigned to the Long Beach Sea Range, a detachment of the Naval Ordnance Test Station.

=== 72' Torpedo recovery boat ===
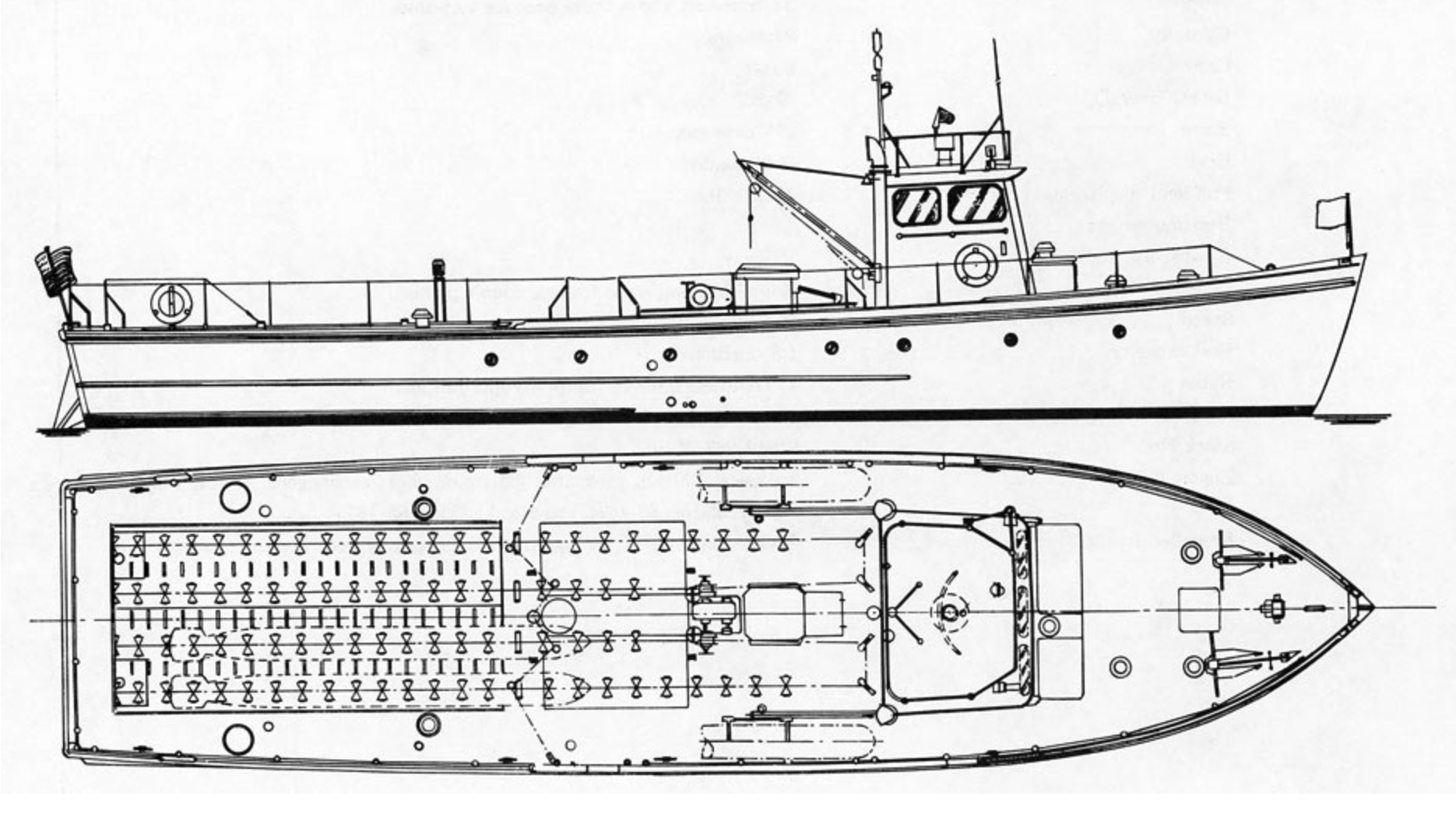
72' Torpedo Recovery Boat, Mark II

These vessels were built with two different pilot house configurations. The Mark I boat had an open pilot house, while the Mark II boat enclosed the helm station to protect it from the weather and seas. They were built by several companies. Harbor Boat Building Co. of San Pedro, California built a single 72' torpedo retriever as did National Steel and Shipbuilding Company. Tacoma Boatbuilding Company in Tacoma, Washington was awarded a contract for three boats in May 1960. The total contract award was $394,300. Between 1954 and 1956, Berg Shipbuilding Corp. in Blaine, Washington built six of the boats. J. M. Martinac Shipbuilding of Tacoma, Washington received a contract for $294,723 in 1957. That same year, Elizabeth City Shipyard in Elizabeth City, North Carolina received a contract to build three boats for $583,000.

These boats were 72.66 feet (22.15 m) long, with a beam of 17 feet (5.2 m). At full load they displaced 116,300 pounds (52,800 kg). Their hulls were constructed of double-planked wood. They could reach a speed of 18 knots driven by twin Detroit Diesel 12V71T1 engines or two, twin Detroit Diesel 6-71 modified rail car power units. Their fuel tanks could hold approximately 900 US gallons (3,400 L) giving them a range of 112 miles (180 km). These boats could carry 24,000 pounds (11,000 kg) of torpedoes on deck. They were crewed by seven enlisted men.

72' Torpedo recovery boats
Photo	Pennant# Hull #	Launched	Notes
	TRB-7		Assigned to the Long Beach Sea Range, a detachment of the Naval Ordnance Test Station.
	72C3210	1958	Built by J. M. Martinac Shipbuilding in Tacoma, Washington. Assigned to Keyport, Washington.
	TRB-31 72C3211	October 1958	Mark II type. Built by J. M. Martinac Shipbuilding in Tacoma, Washington. Assigned to Keyport, Washington. This boat was stolen by two enlisted men who took her out for a joy ride and ran her aground near Bainbridge Island. The boat sustained minor damage and was refloated. The men were court-martialed. This boat was stricken in 1995.
	TRB-32 72TR645	March 1966	Mark II type. Assigned to Keyport, Washington.
	TRB-33 72TR652	August 1966	Mark II type. Built by Tacoma Boatbuilding. Assigned to Keyport, Washington. Listed for sale in 2012.
	TRB-10 72TR653		This boat was stricken in 1996.
	TRB-36 72C4560	February 1961	Mark II type. Assigned to Keyport, Washington. This boat was stricken in 2001.
	TRB-37 72C9426	October 1961	Mark II type. Assigned to Keyport, Washington. This boat was stricken in 1999.
	AVR-4		Mark II type. Assigned to Submarine Base Pearl Harbor. She arrived there in July 1960.
	TRB-81		Mark II type. Assigned to Naval Underwater Weapons Research and Engineering Station, Newport, Rhode Island. Broke loose from moorings in storm, beached, and subsequently scrapped, 1988.
	TRB-83		Mark II type. Assigned to Naval Underwater Weapons Research and Engineering Station, Newport, Rhode Island. Ran aground and subsequently scrapped, 1991.

=== 85' Torpedo retriever ===
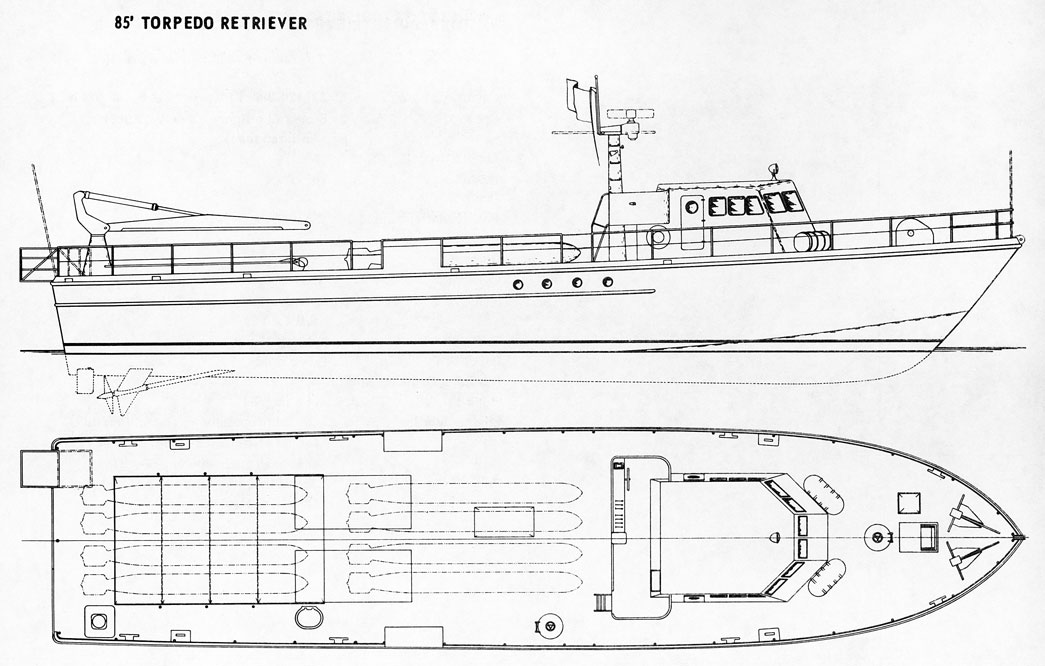
85' torpedo retriever.

These vessels were built by Sewart Seacraft. They were a derivative of an oilfield services crew boat which Sewart sold to support offshore oil installations in the Gulf of Mexico. They were constructed of welded aluminum plates. They were 85 feet (26 m) long, with a beam of 18.7 feet (5.7 m), and a draft of 5.67 feet (1.73 m). They displaced 61 tons at full load. They could reach a speed of 21 knots. They had two propellers driven by two General Motors 16V-71 Diesel engines that produced 1,160 horsepower. They had deck space to recover as many as eight torpedoes. These boats sailed with a crew of five men. Although their hull registration numbers remained in the torpedo retriever sequence, they were referred to as "weapon retriever boats" at the Pacific Missile Range Facility where two were based.

85' Torpedo retrievers
Photo	Pennant # Hull #	Name	Completed	Notes
	TRB-3 85TR651		July 1965	Assigned to the Atlantic Fleet Weapons Training Facility at Roosevelt Roads, Puerto Rico.
	TRB-4 85TR652			Assigned to the Atlantic Fleet Weapons Training Facility at Roosevelt Roads, Puerto Rico.
	WRB-101 85TR653		December 1966	Assigned to the Pacific Missile Range Facility, in Kauai, Hawaii. This vessel was sold to Sea Engineering, Inc. and renamed, Kupaa. Her US Coast Guard official number is 1266230.
	WRB-102 85TR654	Red Baron	January 1967	Assigned to the Pacific Missile Range Facility, in Kauai, Hawaii. She was active until at least 2014. This vessel was listed for auction and replaced by a 95' multipurpose craft.

=== 65' Torpedo recovery boat ===
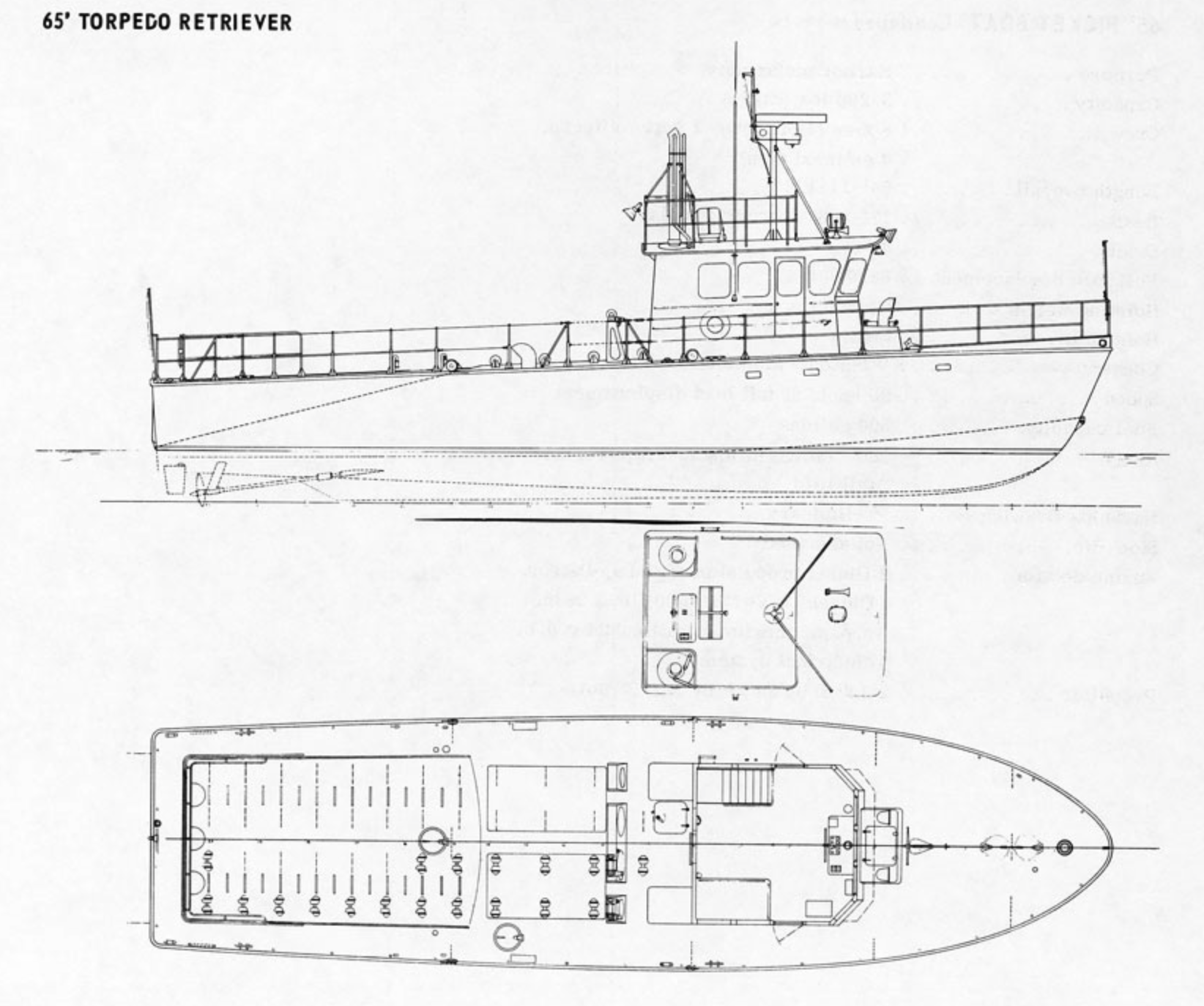
65' Torpedo recovery boat

Peterson Builders, Inc. built six of these vessels at its shipyard in Sturgeon Bay, Wisconsin between 1967 and 1968. They were constructed of welded aluminum plates. The boats were 65 feet (20 m) long with a beam of 17 feet (5.2 m). They weighed 69,000 pounds (31,000 kg). These boats cruised at 19 knots driven by two propellers 32 inches (81 cm) in diameter. Each was driven by a 12V171 Detroit Diesel engines which produced 400 horsepower. Their fuel tanks had a capacity of 800 gallons, which gave them an unrefueled range of 280 miles. These boats could carry as many as four torpedoes at a time. They had a crew of six. Their original cost was reported as $250,000.

65' Torpedo retrievers
Photo	Pennant # Hull #	Completed	Name	Notes
	TR-671 65TR671	October 1967		Assigned to the Atlantic Fleet Weapons Training facility at Roosevelt Roads, Puerto Rico.
	TR-2 65TR672			Assigned to Naval Base Subic Bay, Philippines
	TR-10 65TR673	1968	Sea Hawk	Assigned to San Diego. This boat was stricken in 1995. She was acquired by the Petaluma Council of the Sea Scouts in 1995 and renamed the SSS Compass Rose.
	TR-4 65TR674	1968	Albatross	This boat was stricken in 1995. She was acquired by the Alameda Council of the Sea Scouts in 2013 and renamed the SSS Makai.
	TRB-5 65TR675	July 1968	Harrier	Assigned to Naval Station Pearl Harbor
	TR-6 65TR676	July 1968	Peregrine	Assigned to Naval Base Guam. Offered for sale in 2009.
	TR-73			Assigned to the Pacific Missile Range Facility. This vessel was used as a torpedo retriever, but appears to have been a utility boat built on the basic 65' hull design. Rather than a sloping aft deck, she had a flat deck and used a crane to bring torpedoes aboard. During a windstorm on 14 January 2004, TR-73's mooring lines parted and the boat was driven ashore at Port Allen, Hawaii. Navy salvors managed to refloat the vessel, but damage was so extensive that she could not be repaired. She was hauled ashore and sold for scrap.

=== 100' Torpedo weapons retriever ===
Eight vessels of this class were built. Three were built by Western Boat Building at Tacoma, Washington, one by Dorchester Shipbuilding Corporation at Dorchester, New Jersey, and three by Peterson Builders, Inc. at Sturgeon Bay, Wisconsin. Their design was based on the PGM-39-class gunboat. These boats were 102 feet (31 m) long with a beam of 21 feet (6.4 m). They displaced 165 tons at full load. Their hulls were constructed of welded steel plates, while their deck and house structure was built of aluminum plate. Their top speed was 18 knots and normal cruising speed was 15 knots. They had two propellers powered by four General Motors 12V-149 Diesel engines. These boats had a single ramp through the transom to recover weapons. They were crewed by 15 enlisted men led by a chief quartermaster. They could remain at sea for 5 days and had an unrefueled range of 2,000 nautical miles. Their large size allowed them to carry 17 tons of torpedoes on deck.

100' Torpedo weapon retrievers
Photo	Pennant # Hull #	Name	Launched	Notes
	TWR-1 100C13728	Diamond	1965	Built by Dorchester Shipbuilding Corporation. Assigned to Submarine Squadron Six, Norfolk, Virginia. As part of Operation Springboard in 1969, Diamond recovered 75 exercise torpedoes in just over a month. This boat was stricken in 1994.
	TWR-3 100C13729	Condor	September 1963	Built by Western Boat Building. Assigned to Submarine Base San Diego. Reported to have cost $440,000. This boat was stricken in 2000.
	TWR-2 100C14250	Keystone	January 1965	Built by Western Boat Building at a cost $450,000. She sailed from Tacoma through the Panama Canal to Charleston, South Carolina under her own power. She was assigned to Submarine Squadron Four.
	TWR-6 100C14251	Ferret	March 1966	Built by Western Boat Building. Assigned to Submarine Base Pearl Harbor. This boat was stricken in 2001.
	TWR-681 100TR681	Labrador	1969	Built by Peterson Builders. Assigned to Submarine Squadron Ten, New London, Connecticut. She was transferred from the Navy to the New York City Police Department in 1995.
	TWR-682 100TR682	Crayfish	1969	Built by Peterson Builders. Assigned to Submarine Squadron Eighteen, Charleston, South Carolina. This boat was stricken in 1991.
	TWR-711 100TR711	(none)	1973	Built by Peterson Builders. Assigned to AUTEC, Andros Island, Bahamas. Reassigned to Naval Underwater Weapons Research and Engineering Station, Newport, Rhode Island in 1989. She was reported to have cost $732,553. She was stricken in 1994.
	TWR-771 100TR771	Phoenix	December 1978	Assigned to Submarine Base Bangor. Now operated by the Sea Scouts as the S.S.S. Northland.

=== 85' Torpedo weapons retriever ===
Tacoma Boatbuilding was awarded a $1.9 million contract for these two vessels in September 1976. They were 85 feet (26 m) long, with a beam of 18.83 feet (5.74 m), and a draft of 5 feet (1.5 m). They displaced 66 tons. They were constructed of welded aluminum plates. Their maximum speed was 14 knots, driven by two Detroit Diesel 12V149 engines. They could carry up to eight torpedoes on deck. They had an unrefueled range of 680 miles.

85' Torpedo weapons retrievers
Photo	Pennant # Hull #	Name	Launched	Notes
	TWR-7 85TR762	Chaparral	1975	Built by Tacoma Boatbuilding. She was assigned to Submarine Base Pearl Harbor. TWR-7 was laid up in San Diego from 1992 to 1997 before returning to active duty at Pearl Harbor. The vessel was sold at auction for $17,300 in March 2020.
	TWR-8 85TR761	Iliwai	1975	Built by Tacoma Boat Building. She is assigned to Submarine Base Pearl Harbor and in service as of October 2021.

=== 120' Torpedo weapons retriever ===
Ten vessels of this class were produced. Marinette Marine designed these boats in response to a Navy bid request. In July 1983 the company was awarded a firm contract for five torpedo weapons retrievers. The contract price on the initial five boats was $12 million. An option for three additional vessels under this contract was exercised in October 1983. Marinette Marine was awarded a contract for the last two boats in January 1985 for delivery in 1986. The contract price for these last two was $7.1 million.

These boats were built of welded steel plates. They were 120 feet (37 m) long, with a beam of 25 feet (7.6 m). They displaced 213 tons at full load. They could cruise at 16 knots, driven by two fixed-pitch propellers powered by two Caterpillar D 3512 2,350 horsepower diesel engines. They had an unrefueled range of 1,700 nautical miles. These boats had a single ramp through the transom to recover weapons. They were large enough to carry 14 Mark 48 torpedoes on deck. There was berthing aboard for 18 crew. This class of vessels represented a significant performance improvement over smaller torpedo retrievers, in that they could remain on station continuously for a week, operate in heavier seas, carry more spent torpedoes, and had improved navigation equipment.

120' Torpedo weapon retrievers
Photo	Pennant # Hull #	Name	Launched	Notes
	TWR-821 120TR821	Swamp Fox	17 October 1984	Originally stationed in Panama City, Florida, she was declared excess in 2000. She was reassigned to Naval Base Point Loma as a component of Submarine Squadron 11, and sailed to her new assignment through the Panama Canal. She won a Battle "E" award in 2009 and 2012. The vessel was sold at auction in 2019.
	TWR-822 120TR822	(none)	18 October 1984	Assigned to Naval Undersea Warfare Engineering Station in Keyport, Washington. Stricken in 1997.
	TWR-823 120TR823	Porpoise	4 May 1985	Originally home-ported at Naval Station Pearl Harbor. She won a battle "E" award in 2007.
	TWR-824 120TR824	(none)		Assigned to Submarine Squadron Four in Charleston, South Carolina. Irreparably damaged by Hurricane Hugo in September 1989.
	TWR-825 120TR825	Swamp Fox	8 August 1985	Originally assigned to the Atlantic Undersea Test and Evaluation Center. She was deactivated in 1995 and transferred to the US Naval Sea Cadet Corps in 1997. She was refit and recommissioned as USNSCS Grayfox in 1998. During the refit, her house was extended aft to provide additional berthing for cadets.
	TWR-831 120TR831	(none)		Assigned to Kings Bay Naval Submarine Base. Irreparably damaged by Hurricane Hugo in 1989.
	TWR-832 120TR832	(none)	22 March 1986	Originally assigned to Naval Base Point Loma.
	TWR-833 120TR833	(none)	4 April 1986	Assigned to the Pacific Missile Range Facility at Kauai, Hawaii. She was replaced there in 2014 by MPC-2, a 97' range training support vessel. This boat was acquired by Paramount Builders of American Samoa and renamed M/V Pago Pago. It was, in turn, acquired by the government of American Samoa for $1.2 million in 2020. Her Coast Guard Number is CG1429691.
	TWR-841 120TR841	(none)	15 August 1996	Assigned to the Naval Undersea Warfare Center in Newport, Rhode Island. Sold at auction in March 2021 for $81,600, now called HAZAR. Stuck in mud and abandoned in South Carolina.
	TWR-842 120TR842	Narwhal	22 September 1996	Assigned to Naval Base Point Loma as a component of Submarine Squadron 11. The ship was deactivated on 19 October 2012 and offered for sale at auction.

=== 85' Torpedo weapons retriever ===
These vessels were built by SWATH Ocean Systems at Chula Vista, California. These boats are 85 feet (26 m) long with a beam of 22 feet (6.7 m). They are constructed of welded aluminum plates. They are powered by twin Caterpillar C32 Diesel engines. Their maximum speed in 20 knots, while cruising speed is 16 knots.

85' Torpedo weapons retrievers
Photo	Pennant # Hull #	Name	Notes
	TWR-7 85SC0501	President Point	Assigned to Navy Undersea Warfare Center at Keyport, WA
	TWR-8 85SC0502	Deception Pass	Assigned to Navy Undersea Warfare Center at Keyport, WA

=== 95' Multi-purpose craft ===
These boats were designed by Hockema & Whalen Associates. In 2012 the Navy awarded a firm contract for three of these vessels, with an option for a fourth, to Modutech Marine Inc., of Tacoma, Washington. The original price for the three was $24.4 million. They are 97 feet (30 m) long, with a beam of 28 feet (8.5 m), and a draft of 7 feet (2.1 m), and displace 130 tons. They are constructed of welded aluminum plate. They can reach a speed of 21 knots driven by twin 5-bladed propellers which are 4 feet (1.2 m) in diameter. These, in turn are powered by two Caterpillar C32 Diesel engines which each develop 1,450 horsepower each. These boats are equipped with a Key Power 18 inches (46 cm) bow thruster to improve maneuverability. They have an unrefueled range of 1,200 miles.

They have four double-bunk staterooms, and the ability to berth another four people on a temporary basis. Their at-sea endurance is seven to ten days.

95' Multi-purpose craft
Photo	Pennant # Hull #	Name	Delivered	Notes
	MPC-1		2012	Assigned to the Pacific Missile Range Facility and berthed at Naval Base Guam.
	MPC-2 95SC1201	Ku'uipo o ke Kai	2014	Assigned to the Pacific Missile Range Facility at Kauai, Hawaii.
	MPC-3 95SC1202	Keiki o ke Kai		Assigned to the Pacific Missile Range Facility at Kauai, Hawaii.
	MPC-4 95SC1203	Uhini	2015	Assigned to Naval Station Pearl Harbor.

=== 114' Range Support Craft ===
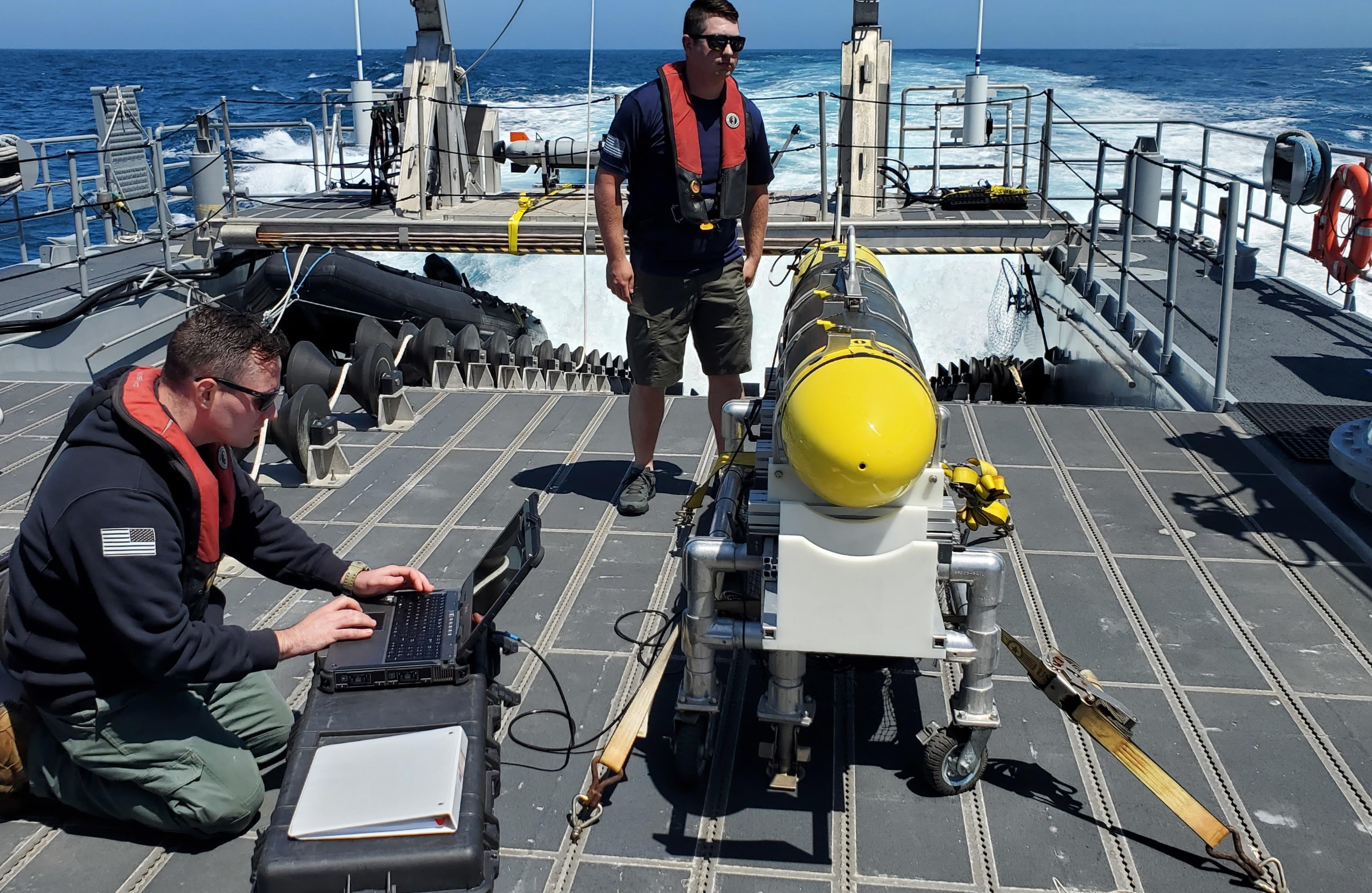
A CARINA undersea glider is prepared for launch off San Diego on board a range training support craft in 2021.

Marine Group Boat Works built four vessels of this class at its Chula Vista, California shipyard. The initial contract for three boats was awarded in 2009. The four are reported to have cost $42 million. The vessels are 114 feet (35 m) long. They are constructed of welded aluminum plates. They are powered by twin Caterpillar 3512 Diesel engines which produce 1,800 horsepower each. Among the technical innovations in their design, is the ability to run on B100 biodiesel and the use of Seakeeper gyroscopic stabilization to allow them to operate in heavier seas.

114' Range training support craft
Photo	Pennant # Hull #	Delivered	Notes
	RSC-1 114SC0901	2010	Assigned to Southern California Offshore Range.
	RSC-2 114SC0902	2011	
	RSC-3 114SC0903	2012	
	RSC-4 114SC0904	2014	Assigned to Southern California Offshore Range.

=== Other Torpedo retrievers ===
The Navy has employed a variety of boats as torpedo retrievers that were not produced as part of a class. Several were purchased from oil-field supply companies, and several were transferred from the U.S. Air Force. Their configurations were unique, but they were characterized by a large, open aft deck on which to carry spent munitions.

Other Torpedo retrievers
Photo	Pennant # Hull #	Name	Notes
	100NS8702	Retriever	She was built by Swiftships in its Morgan City, Louisiana shipyard in 1978 as the oil-field support vessel Seaco Traveller. The Navy acquired the vessel in 1989. She is 100 feet (30 m) long with a beam of 20 feet (6.1 m), and a draft of 7 feet (2.1 m). She has three propellers each driven by a General Motors 12V-71 T1 engine. She can reach 20 knots and has an unrefueled range of 800 miles at 18 knots. She was assigned to Fleet Composite Squadron (VC) 6 at Norfolk, Virginia. She is now operated by the Atlantic Targets and Marine Operations (ATMO) Division in Key West, Florida.
	180NS8201	Hugo	She was built by McDermott Shipyard in New Iberia, Louisiana as the oil-field support vessel Crystal Pelham. She was completed in 1982. She was acquired by the Navy and placed in service on 3 July 1991. She is a replacement for TWR-824 which was irreparably damaged by Hurricane Hugo in 1989. This boat was initially assigned to the Atlantic Fleet Weapons Training facility at Roosevelt Roads, Puerto Rico. She is 165 feet (50 m) long with a beam of 40 feet (12 m), and a draft of 11 feet (3.4 m). She was more recently classified as a training support vessel and retitled USNS Hugo (TSV-2). She is currently assigned to Carrier Strike Group 4, based in Norfolk, Virginia. On 12 April 2021 the Navy contracted with Great Eastern Group, Inc. to crew and manage the vessel. On January 18, 2024 she was listed for sale at auction to the public. She was sold to The Spaceport Company, a startup aiming to convert her into a mobile launch pad, and renamed Once in a Lifetime.
	180NS8202	Hunter	She was built by Quality Shipbuilders in Moss Point, Louisiana as the oil-field support vessel Nola Pelham. She was completed in June 1991. She was acquired by the Navy and placed into service on 3 July 1991. This boat was initially assigned to the Atlantic Fleet Weapons Training facility at Roosevelt Roads, Puerto Rico. She is 180 feet (55 m) long with a beam of 38 feet (12 m), and a draft of 13 feet (4.0 m). She has more recently classified as a training support vessel and retitled USNS Hunter (TSV-3). She is currently assigned to Carrier Strike Group 4, based in Norfolk, Virginia. On 12 April 2021 the Navy contracted with Great Eastern Group, Inc. to crew and manage the vessel.
	SL-120 120NS8004	(none)	She was built by Swiftships in its Morgan City, Louisiana shipyard in 1988 as a missile retriever for the U.S. Air Force which gave her the hull registration number MR-120-8004. She was 117.5 feet (35.8 m) long, with a beam of 24.7 feet (7.5 m), and a draft of 6.75 feet (2.06 m). Her full-load displacement was 133 tons. She was capable of reaching 30 knots driven by four propellers, each powered by a Detroit Diesel 16V92 MTA engine. She was transferred to the Navy in 1996 and assigned to Port Hueneme, California.
	TWR-6 25MTR0501	Devil Ray	Assigned to Naval Base Point Loma as a component of Submarine Squadron 11. She was part of the squadron as early as 2010. The boat won a Battle "E" award in 2011 and 2014. In 2021 Devil Ray was reassigned from Point Loma to the Chesapeake Bay Detachment of the Naval Research Laboratory. She made the trip from West Coast to East aboard a barge rather than on her own bottom.

== Retired torpedo retrievers ==
A number of surplus torpedo retrievers have been given to the Sea Scouts and other public organizations, and some are still afloat today.

Type	Name	Organization	Notes
40' torpedo retriever	S.S.S. Whitfield	Snohomish, Washington Sea Scouts	
40' torpedo retriever	S.S.S. Bradley	Honolulu, Hawaii Sea Scouts	Commissioned into the Sea Scouts in 1934
40' torpedo retriever	(unknown)	Junior Midshipman of America, New London, Connecticut	
42' torpedo retriever	S.S.S. Storm King	Hartford, Connecticut Sea Scouts	
42' torpedo retriever	(unknown)	Sea Scout posts 151 and 154	This boat was obtained from the Navy in 1962, refit, and launched on Navajo Lake, Utah by the Sea Scouts in 1967. Later that year the boat ran over a buoy cable. This wrenched a propeller shaft and the vessel flooded and sank.
42' torpedo retriever		Douglas County Fairgrounds	The Navy surplussed this boat, "9", from Navy Torpedo Station Keystone and donated it to the Fairgrounds in 1961.
63' torpedo retriever	(unknown)	Transferred from Navy Torpedo Station Keyport to the Job Corps center at Tongue Point, Oregon.	Transferred in 1965.
63' torpedo retriever	S.S.S. Compass Rose	Petaluma, California Sea Scouts	Commissioned into the Sea Scouts in 1959. This boat was condemned and scrapped in 1990.
65' torpedo retriever	S.S.S. Makai	Alameda, California Sea Scouts	ex-TRB-4 Albatross (65TR674). She was the 2013 Sea Scout national flagship.
65' torpedo retriever	S.S.S. Compass Rose	Petaluma, California Sea Scouts	ex-TR-10 Sea Hawk (65TR673). Acquired in 1995.
72' torpedo recovery boat	S.S.S. Active	San Rafael, California Sea Scouts	
72' torpedo recovery boat	S.S.S. Retriever	Grays Harbor, Washington Sea Scouts	Acquired in 2010, scrapped in 2017
100' torpedo weapons retriever	S.S.S. Northland	Richmond, California Sea Scouts	ex-TWR-771 Phoenix
120' torpedo weapons retriever	USNSCS Grayfox	US Naval Sea Cadet Corps	ex-TWR-825 Swamp Fox. Transferred from the Navy in 1997, refit, and commissioned into USNCS in 1998.

== See also ==
- Cape Flattery-class torpedo trials craft
- Torpedo trials craft
- List of United States Navy ships
- List of yard and district craft of the United States Navy § Torpedo Trials Craft (YTT)
