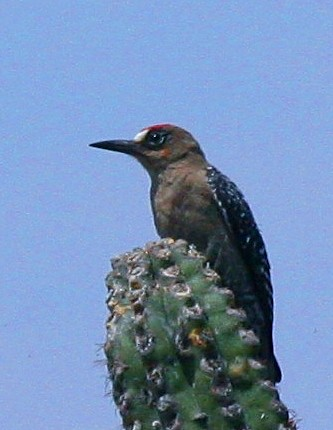

Conservation status
- Least Concern (IUCN 3.1)

Scientific classification
- Kingdom: Animalia
- Phylum: Chordata
- Class: Aves
- Order: Piciformes
- Family: Picidae
- Genus: Melanerpes
- Species: M. hypopolius

Binomial name
- Melanerpes hypopolius (Wagler, 1829)

= Grey-breasted woodpecker =

Species of bird

The grey-breasted woodpecker (Melanerpes hypopolius) is a species of bird in the family Picidae. It is endemic to the interior of southwestern Mexico.

== Distribution and habitat ==
Areas of domain in Mexico include Guerrero, Morelos, and Puebla. Knowledge of the behavior of this bird was widely unknown before a 1990 study out of the Cooper Ornithological Society which observed six of the birds. The study confirmed the communal roosting habits of the birds, specifically on cacti. Its natural habitats are subtropical or tropical moist lowland forests and subtropical or tropical high-altitude shrubland.

== Description ==
Like Gila woodpecker (male has round red crown patch), but pale red on cheek; short black line over eye; much darker and grayer below and on head. It is also similar to the zebra-backed birds of the same genus.

== Population ==
The population is slightly less than 50,000 in its native Mexico, classifying it as a species of least concern for extinction.

== Eating habits ==
Its food source is the fruit of the cactus, similar to that of the grey fox, cactus wren, house finch and lesser long-nosed bat, but cactus fruit is not its only main food source, groups of 3–10 forage for various insects of the region, like cicadas and termites, and sometimes, they even catch flies. The birds work together to scan for food, and they do so in an amiable fashion, never showing outward aggression for food.

== Fledglings ==
The grey-breasted woodpecker behave slightly differently to some other species in their genus, Melanerpes. They don't beg for their parent's attention or for food, but this observable behavior only references when they are not hidden. Fledglings spend most of their time hidden inside cacti, and outwardly do not appear to eat often. The plumage of a fledging differs from that of the adult, featuring darker necks and breasts, and the red crown patch is significantly darker than adults, enough that it is noticeable.

== Vocalization ==
David observed three types of vocalization from the grey-breasted woodpecker, including a loud and aggressive sounding rattle, a "chuck" sound by females when the observer approached nests, and a "yak" sound with a heavy inflection.
