= Grey fox (disambiguation) =

The gray fox is a species of fox found in North, Central, and northern South America.

Grey fox or gray fox may also refer to:

== Animals ==
- South American gray fox, a species of zorro ("false foxes") found in southern South America

== Other ==
- Gray Fox (military), the codename used by the Intelligence Support Activity at the beginning of the War in Afghanistan
- "Gray Fox", a nickname for college basketball coach Everett Case
- The Gray Fox, a character from The Elder Scrolls IV: Oblivion
- USNSCS Grayfox, a United States Naval Sea Cadet Corps training vessel for cadets
- The Grey Fox, a 1982 film
- Gray Fox (Metal Gear), a character in the Metal Gear videogame franchise
- The Grey Fox, a fictional character in Red Panda Adventures

== See also ==
- Grey (disambiguation)
- Fox (disambiguation)
- Silver fox (disambiguation)
