= Andrew Burcher =

U.S. Navy admiral

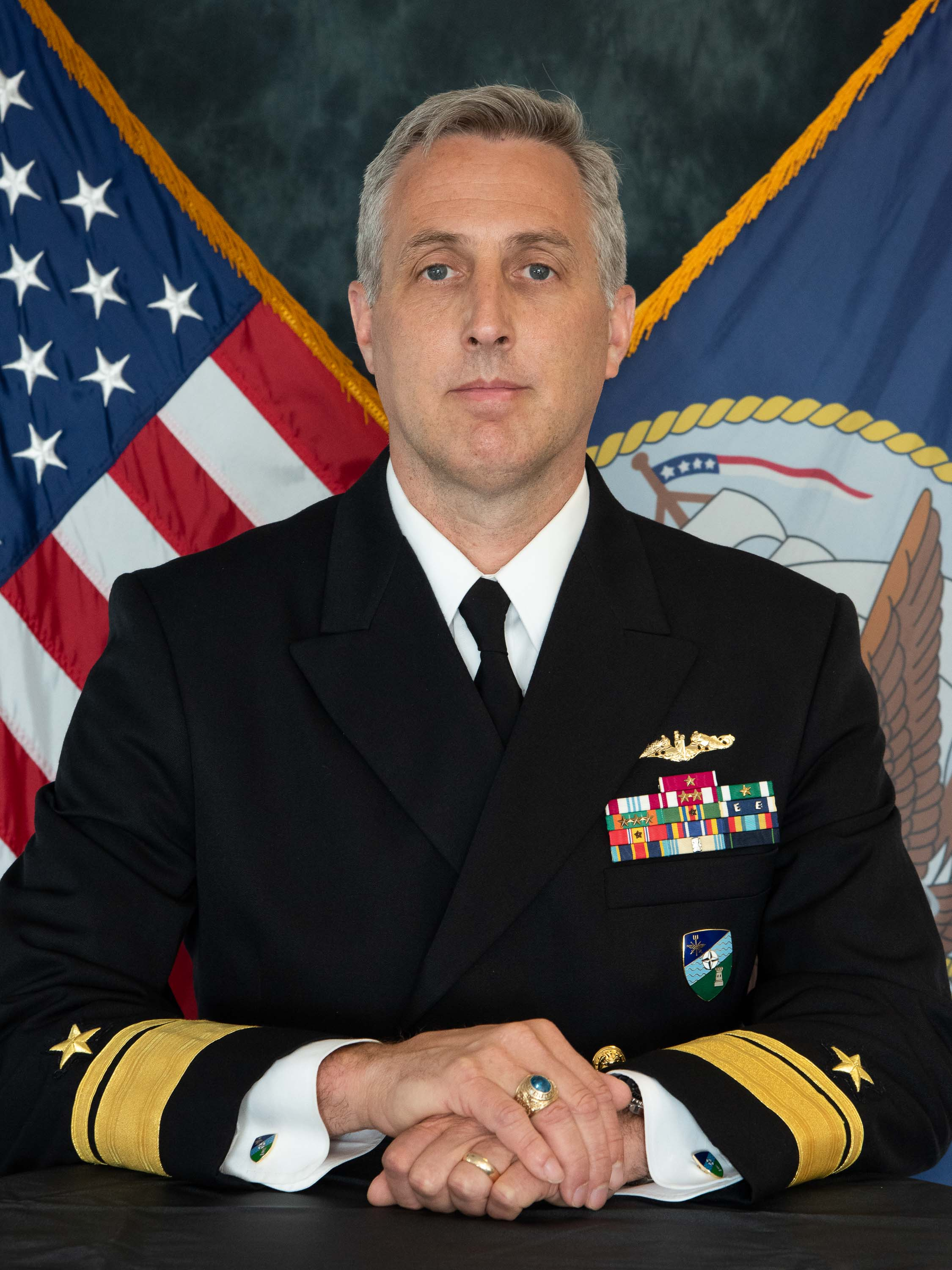
- Official portrait, 2020
- Born: Eugene Andrew Burcher; April 10, 1966 (age 60); Alexandria, Virginia
- Military career
- Allegiance: United States
- Branch: United States Navy
- Service years: 1988–2023
- Rank: Rear Admiral
- Nickname: Andy
- Commands: Submarines, North Atlantic Treaty Organization

Eugene Andrew Burcher (born April 10, 1966) is a retired United States Navy rear admiral who last served as the director of Reserve Expeditionary Force Generation of the United States Navy, with additional duty as vice commander of the United States Fleet Forces Command from October 1, 2021 to September 2023. He most recently served as the Deputy Chief of Staff for Submarines of the NATO Maritime Command and Commander of Submarines of the North Atlantic Treaty Organization from July 19, 2019 to July 2021. Previously, he served as the Reserve Deputy Commander of Submarine Force Atlantic.

Born and raised in Alexandria, Virginia, Burcher earned a B.S. degree in mechanical engineering from the United States Naval Academy in 1988. He later received an M.B.A. degree from the Rensselaer Polytechnic Institute in 1995 and a J.D. degree from the University of Richmond in 1997. Burcher transitioned to the Navy Reserve in 1999.

Burcher married fellow University of Richmond law student Julia Burke Riley on August 9, 1997 in Alexandria, Virginia. They have a daughter and two sons. In 2021, their daughter was commissioned as a Navy ensign by her father before reporting to flight school.

Military offices
Preceded by Andrew C. Lennon	Reserve Deputy Commander of Submarine Force Atlantic; 2017–2019	Succeeded by Thomas Wall
Preceded by Andrew C. Lennon	Deputy Chief of Staff for Submarines of the NATO Maritime Command and Commander of Submarines NATO; 2019–2021	Succeeded by Stephen G. Mack
Preceded by A. Douglas Beal	Director of Reserve Expeditionary Force Generation of the United States Navy; 2021–2023	Succeeded by Kenneth R. Blackmon
Preceded by A. Douglas Beal	Vice Commander of the United States Fleet Forces Command; 2021–2023	Succeeded by Kenneth R. Blackmon
