= Navy League Cadet Corps =

Naval sea cadets

United States Navy League Cadet Corps
- Country: United States
- Role: Youth Development Program
- Website: navyleague.org

The United States Navy League Cadet Corps (USNLCC or NSCC) is a non-profit organization for ages 10-13 and is the junior version of the United States Naval Sea Cadet Corps (USNSCC or NSCC) the program is aimed at development for younger cadets, aged 10 through 13, under the auspices of the Navy League of the United States. The organization provides opportunities for children to learn about the seagoing military services, community service, citizenship, and an understanding of discipline and teamwork so that they are prepared for membership in the NSCC if they decide to. While NLCC cadets can go into the NSCC when they turn 13, they may also elect to remain in the NLCC until age 14, when they must either transfer into the NSCC, or leave the program.

NLCC cadets can be seen wearing Uniforms of the United States Navy with the insignia of NLCC membership. NSCC officers administer the program and supervise the cadets. NLCC units are grouped with NSCC units under the supervision of regional and senior regional directors. However, those who have achieved a high training status can operate semi-independently from their attached NSCC Units. NLCC units that are of independent status are called "Training Ships" NLCC units who do not have enough cadets to warrant independent status are attached to NSCC units as called companies.

== Medals ==
NLCC Cadets can earn most of the same type of medals and awards as Sea Cadets, and can wear all earned ribbons except annual service ribbon when transferring into the NSCC program.The rank system for cadets proceeds as follows: Recruit (LC-1), Apprentice Cadet (LC-2), Able Cadet (LC-3), Petty Officer 3rd Class (LC-4), Petty Officer 2nd Class (LC-5), Petty Officer 1st Class (LC-6), Ship's Leading Petty Officer (LC-7). Promotions are made by time-in requirement and passing of examinations. The minimum time in rate requirements are four months for lower rates and six months for petty officers and a 75% correct score on coursework and advancement examinations. The last rank, Ship's Leading Petty Officer (LC-7), is almost never attained. A cadet who has successfully completed NLCC Orientation, is advanced to NLCC petty officer third class and serves a minimum of one year of service in the NLCC will go into the NSCC at a higher grade. For the first three ranks, LC-1 through LC-3, you add additional chevrons to the uniform (E2-T).

== Ranks ==
The USNLCC follows the same ranking as the USNSCC, with chevrons instead of being silver unlike gold, seen in USNSCC ranks.

Rank	Insignia
LC-1 Recruit Cadet	No insignia worn
LC-2 Apprentice Cadet	LC-2 Apprentice Cadet Sleeve Insignia
LC-3 Able Cadet	LC-3 Able Cadet Sleeve Insignia
LC-4 Petty Officer Third Class	LC-4 Petty Officer Third Class Sleeve Insignia
LC-5 Petty Officer Second Class	LC-5 Petty Officer Second Class Sleeve Insignia
LC-6 Petty Officer First Class	LC-6 Petty Officer First Class Sleeve Insignia
LC-7 Ship's Leading Petty Officer	LC-7 Ship's Leading Petty Officer Sleeve Insignia

== See also ==
- Navy League
- Sea Cadets
