= Sea cadets =

International maritime program for youth

Sea cadet
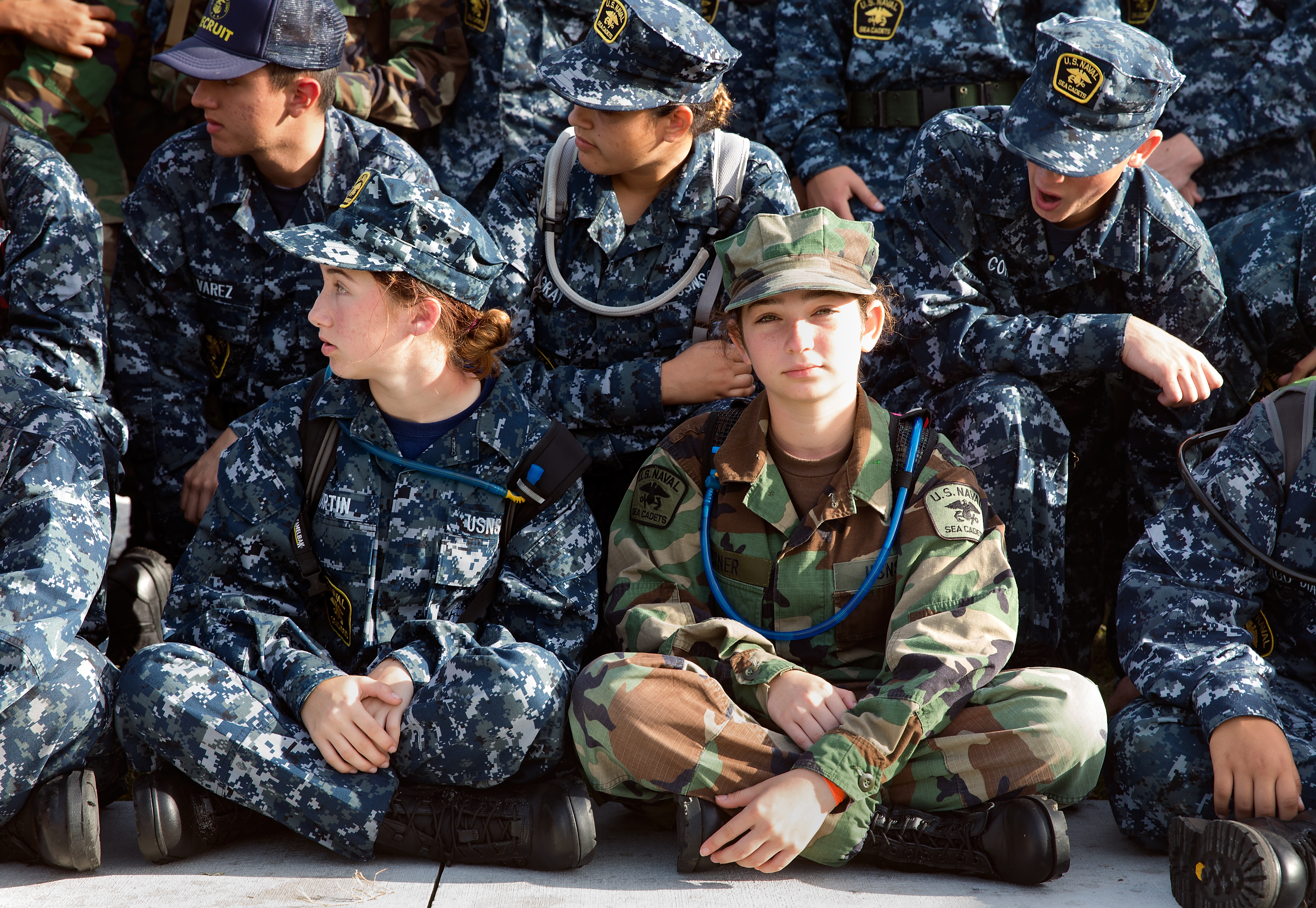
- Sea cadet recruits from Palm Beach, Florida, United States (2016)

Occupation
- Names: sea cadets • sea cadet corps
- Pronunciation: (/ˈsiː kəˌdɛt/) • (/ˈsiː kəˌdɛt ˌkɔːrz/)
- Activity sectors: voluntary • communal • non-military

A sea cadet pronounced in English (/ˈsiː kəˌdɛt/), also known as "sea cadet corps", pronounced in English (/ˈsiː kəˌdɛt ˌkɔːrz/), is defined as the non-government voluntary youth service sponsored by one's naval force for youth interested in the maritime services. Annually, sea cadets will commonly learn maritime traditions and the history associated with their maritime force.

The phrase sea cadet corps can be applied for more prominent sea cadet programs, while smaller less prominent ones may commonly refer to the service as "sea cadets". Although not all countries may use the terminology "sea cadet corps" it is officially used in countries and territories of Australia, Barbados, Belgium, Bermuda, Canada, Germany, Hong Kong, India, Netherlands, New Zealand, Portugal, Russia, Sweden, Singapore, South Africa, United States, United Kingdom and Zimbabwe.

Participation in community service may be prominent; related activities can include community outreach, public projects, food drives and first aid. In general, sea cadet organizations are voluntary and do not require a service obligation, however, some organizations may provide advanced pay and ranks in the armed forces when recruited. Some individuals receive medals and ranks depending on their organization's official structure, which are commonly inspired by an armed force relating to the maritime services.

== Etymology ==
The terminology sea cadet combines sea, from Old English sǣ, meaning "large body of water," and cadet, from the French from Gascon dialect capdet, a diminutive based on the Latin caput ‘head’. The conception of ‘little head’ or "inferior head" gave rise to that of "younger", "junior". Together, the full term refers to youth engaged in naval training programs. The usual of the term cadet in a naval context dates to at least the early 17th century, when it was adopted into English to refer to officer trainees in the armed forces.

== History ==
=== 19th century ===
The first publicised children sea cadet corps, for young people dubbed the "Yeovil Sea Cadet Corps", was established in 1854, in Whitstable, Kent, England, formed by local communities seeking to provide maritime opportunities for young sailors. Local fishermen from the community helped the young sailors meet the requirements and funded all equipment with the exception being the funding and help received from businessmen and businesswomen seeking the same goal. The end of the Crimean War in 1856 sought the establishment of the second largest youth sea cadet congregation, addressed as the "Naval Lads' Brigade" in London, England due to orphans that were described as "sleeping in the back streets", and funded by local communities in England. In 1894 the Imperial Navy League was formed in London, England. From 1889 to 1914, the country of England, was of victim to wide−spread imperialism, and significant propaganda implemented widely by the Imperial Navy League and often was challenged, from the public. The institution was described by the agitated public by Mark W. Hamilton as a "Sea Power" in one of the most well−renowned academic journals known as The Mariner's Mirror. Canada, in 1895, founded the Navy League of Canada to promote maritime issues to the public, identifying as a non-government organization for youth. Commencing towards the end of the 19th century in 1899, Queen Victoria (r. 1837–1901), donated £10 (worth £1,000 in today's money) to the Windsor Unit to fund their uniforms.

=== 20th century ===
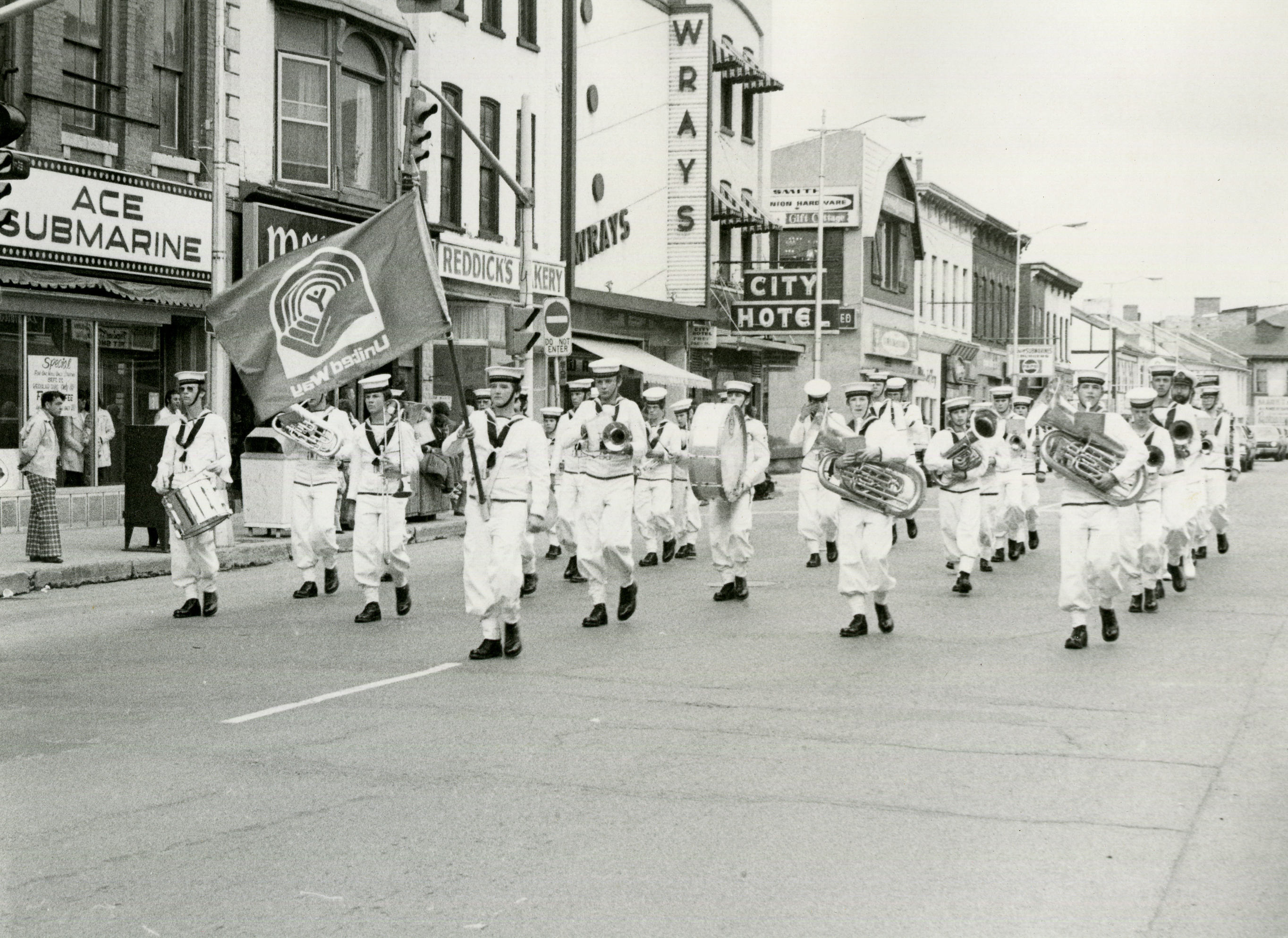
Ontario, Canada sea cadet band waving a United Way of Canada flag, on a street (1977)

By the introduction of 20th century the Imperial Navy League had adopted the Windsor Unit and later sought recognition from the admiralty. Established in 1900, Navy League of Australia introduced the Australian Navy Cadets under the Naval Defence Act developed by the later sponsor, the Australian Navy in 1910. In 1929, the first Sea Cadet Unit was established in New Zealand dubbed the Boys' Naval Brigade, although training would later be disbanded a year later, other Sea Cadet Units continued their training after the 1930s. Subsequently, in World War ᛁᛁ, multiple sea cadet organizations assembled around the world, accompanied by large expansion with an estimated 200 units in the United Kingdom being established, with an estimated sheer total of 10,000 cadets. The Royal Marines Volunteer Cadet Corps was created in 1955, and in 1957 the Indian Sea Cadet Corps was formed. Coincidentally, a year later the United States Naval Sea Cadet Corps would be federally chartered by the United States Navy. Progressing later, sea cadet programs continued to expand to other countries. From the late 1970s and early 1980s, sea cadet organizations became informed of the need for young girls to be allowed to participate. The United States Navy League allowed young girls to join in 1974 from the introduction of United States Public Law 67−855. Later in England in 1980, the Girl's Nautical Training Corps was officially administered in coordination with the Imperial Navy League. Gradually by the year 1995 the International Sea Cadet Association (ISCA) was formed which prohibited an organization's disqualification of a sea cadet based on an individual's gender, race, or religion and convictions for all sea cadet organizations with an active and non-active membership internationally.

== International Sea Cadet Association ==
The International Sea Cadet Association (ISCA) carries a significant role in policy, regulations and the international right to be called a sea cadet organization. The broad fundamental goal is to inspire young individuals in the maritime sector and educate young individuals in international culture through its International Exchange Programs (IEP). There are a total of twenty-one countries in the International Sea Cadet Association, each country participates voluntarily, and can leave at any time although permanently in delegations.

=== Statement ===
"A sea cadet corps or corresponding organization is a voluntary, non-political and non-militant youth organisation, with membership unrestricted by race, sex or philosophical or religious convictions, which offers practical and theoretical training in nautical and maritime subjects within the context based on naval traditions." —International Sea Cadet Association

==== Active members ====
- Australia:
  - Australian Navy Cadets (Formed from the Australian Naval Reserve Cadet Corps and the Navy League Sea Cadet Corps)
  - Navy League Sea Cadet Corps
- Barbados: Barbados Cadet Corps
- Belgium: Royal Belgian Sea Cadet Corps
- Bermuda: Bermuda Sea Cadet Corps
- Canada:
  - Royal Canadian Sea Cadets
  - Navy League Cadet Corps (Canada)
- Germany: Deutsche Marine Jugend e.V. (Sea cadet corps of Germany)
- Hong Kong: Hong Kong Sea Cadet Corps
- India: Sea Cadet Corps (India)
- Japan:
- Japan Sea Cadet Federation
- Junior Sea Friends' Federation of Japan (established in 1951 to train youth in maritime skills and water safety)
- South Korea: Sea Explorers of Korea
- Lithuania: Sea Cadets of Lithuania
- Netherlands: Sea Cadet Corps The Netherlands (Zeekadetkorps Nederland)
- New Zealand:
  - New Zealand Sea Cadet Corps
  - Sea Cadet Association of New Zealand (supporters group for the Supreme Court of New Zealand)
- Portugal: Portugal Sea Cadet Corps (Corpo de Cadetes do Mar de Portugal)
- Russia: Young mariners league of Russia
- Singapore: Singapore National Cadet Corps (Sea)
- South Africa: South African Sea Cadets
- Sweden: Swedish Sea Cadet Corps
- United Kingdom:
  - Girls' Nautical Training Corps
  - Sea Cadets (Formally known as the "Sea Cadet Corps" in the UK, the first such named organisation in the world. Renamed and re-branded to "Sea Cadets" in 2011)
  - Marine Society & Sea Cadets (Parent charity of the Sea Cadet Corps, following the merger of the Sea Cadet Association and the Marine Society for seafarers)
- United States:
  - United States Naval Sea Cadet Corps
  - Navy League Cadet Corps
- Zimbabwe
  - Zimbabwe Sea Cadet Corps

== See also ==
- International Sea Cadet Corps
- Cadet corps
- Cadets (youth program)
- Reserve Forces and Cadets Association
- Sea scouts
