= USNSCS Grayfox =

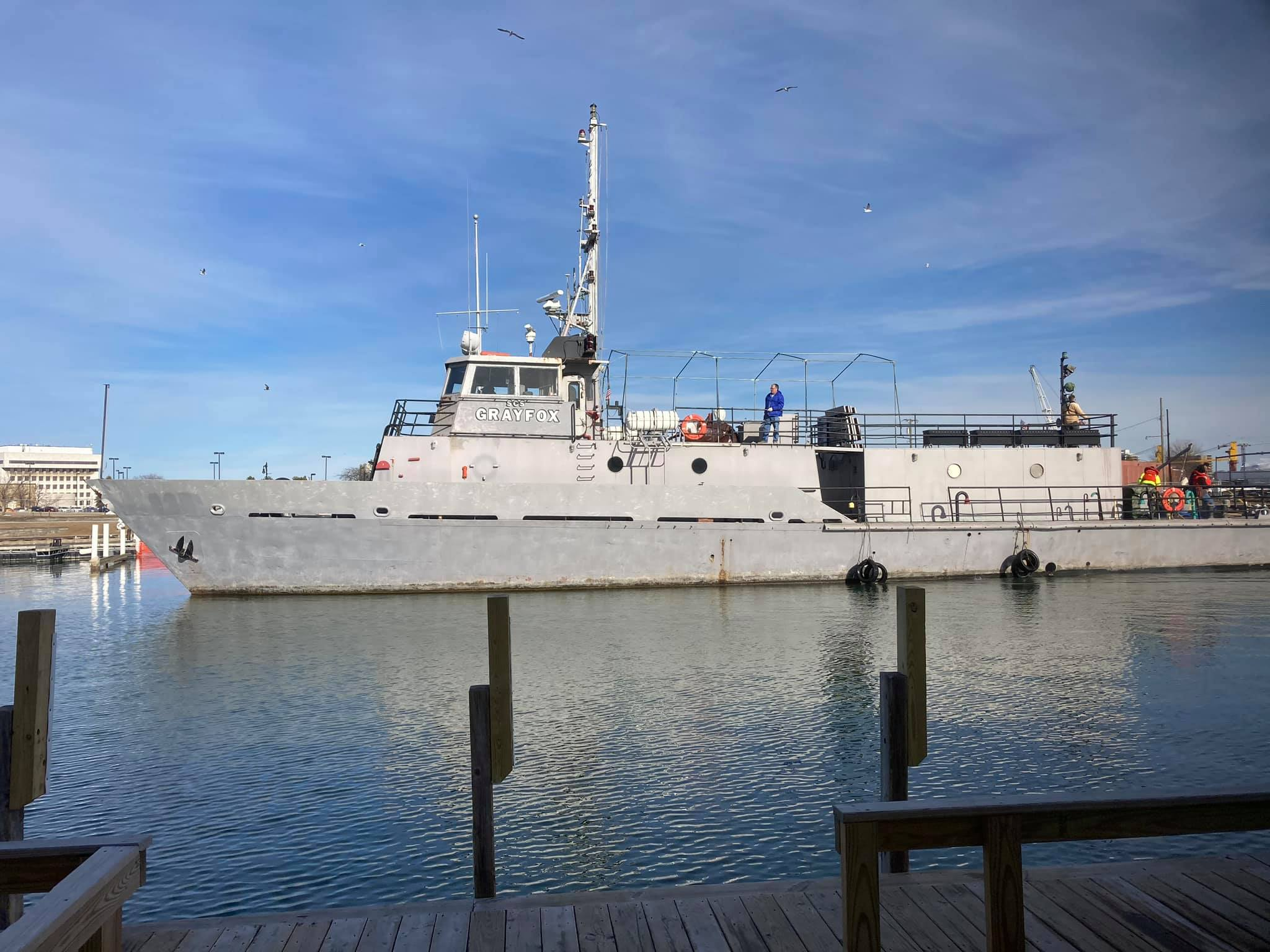
- Grayfox under power, Port Huron, Michigan, 2021

History
- Name: USNSCS Grayfox
- Builder: Marinette Marine, Marinette, Wisconsin
- Acquired: 15 August 1997
- Commissioned: 26 April 1998
- Home port: Port Huron, Michigan
- Identification: MMSI number: 367333289; Callsign: WDD3042
- Status: Moored

General characteristics
- Type: USNSCC training ship
- Displacement: 213 long tons (216 t) full load
- Length: 120 ft (37 m) o/a
- Beam: 25 ft (7.6 m)
- Draft: 7 ft 6 in (2.29 m)
- Propulsion: 2 × Caterpillar 3512 TAC 1,175 hp (876 kW) diesel engines, 2 shafts
- Speed: 12–16 knots (22–30 km/h; 14–18 mph) cruising; 18 knots (33 km/h; 21 mph) maximum
- Range: 1,700 nmi (3,100 km)
- Endurance: 1 week at sea
- Complement: 30 Sea Cadets, 6 Sea Cadet Officers

The United States Naval Sea Cadet Ship (USNSCS) Grayfox (TWR-825) is a training ship, the largest owned by the United States Naval Sea Cadet Corps. It is homeported in Port Huron, Michigan and is used by the USNSCC for shipboard training.

== History ==
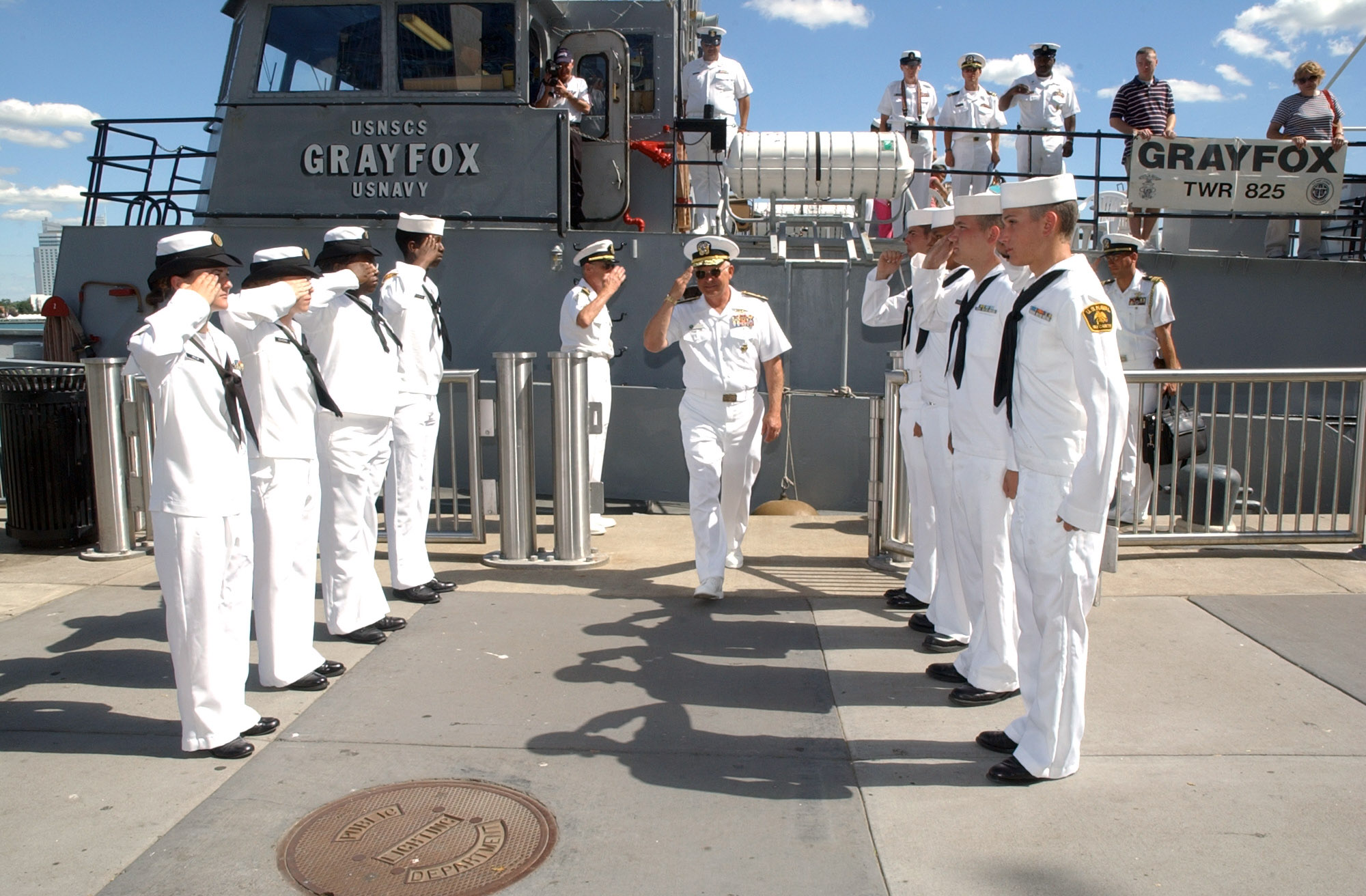
Vice Admiral Terrance Etnyre, commander of Naval Surface Force, U.S. Pacific Fleet, salutes the Sea Cadets performing as sideboys of the U.S. Naval Sea Cadet training ship Grayfox (TWR 825), Detroit Navy Week, 2007

=== United States Navy, 1985–1995 ===
The Grayfox began its service in 1985 as one of ten 120-foot Torpedo Weapons Retriever. It was assigned to the United States Navy's Atlantic Undersea Testing and Evaluation Center (AUTEC) on Andros Island, Bahamas. Due to the decreasing threat of torpedoes, the Navy put it out of use in 1995 and transferred it to the USNSCC on August 15, 1997.

=== U.S. Naval Sea Cadet Corps, 1997–present ===
All of the torpedo rollers were removed from the after deck and returned to AUTEC. The ramp was welded, with most of the renovations and upkeep handled by cadets and volunteers.

The ship was commissioned in the U.S. Naval Sea Cadet Corps on April 26, 1998 as the USNSCS Grayfox by Mrs. Jack Kennedy, wife of the former National President of the Navy League of the United States.

The ship has berthing for 30 cadets and six officers. The large berthing capacity is due to the extension of the main cabin that was constructed by F.C. Sherman Division and other volunteers.

== See also ==
- United States Naval Sea Cadet Corps
- Sea Cadet
- Training ship
