= United States Naval Sea Cadet Corps =

Non-profit founded 10 September, 1962

Coordinates: 38.8905774°N 77.0866975°W

- Emblem of the United States Naval Sea Cadet Corps
- Founded: September 10, 1962
- Country: United States
- Branch: Navy, Coast Guard
- Type: Non-profit, charitable 501(c)(3)
- Role: Youth development program
- Size: 325 units
- Part of: Navy League of the United States Navy League Cadet Corps
- Nicknames: "Naval Sea Cadet Corps", "Sea Cadets"
- Mottos: "Honor, Respect, Commitment, and Service"
- Colors: Navy blue, gold
- Anniversaries: 10 September
- Former ship: USNSCS Grayfox
- Headquarters: Arlington, Virginia
- Website: seacadets.org

Commanders
- Executive Director: RADM Andrew Lennon, USN (Retired)
- Chief of Staff: Vicki Powell
- National chairman: CDR Sarah Higgins
- Strategic Growth Director: Capt Thurraya S.Kent, USN (Retired)
- Information Technology Director: Sunitha Thazethe

The United States Naval Sea Cadet Corps (USNSCC) is a non-profit charitable youth program developed by the United States Navy and the Navy League of the United States. It was first conceptualized by Arleigh Burke, a Navy Admiral who observed the success of other countries' naval organizations for youth in 1958. The organization comprises 5,600 Sea Cadets and a total of 8,000 volunteers, with cadets aged ten to the end of twelfth grade. Some Sea Cadets who participate are eligible for advanced enlistment pay grades in the United States Navy upon recruitment. Although participation in the United States Naval Sea Cadet Corps does not necessitate a member commit to the armed services, it is encouraged.

The United States Naval Sea Cadet Corps is a non-profit, meaning the organization relies on military support for uniforms, equipment, and funding. Sea Cadets receive their equipment through the United States Navy and the United States Coast Guard and through other branches installations and facilities. Historically, the USNSCC operated a vessel known as the USNSCS Grayfox, and she was maintained by the Navy Reserve. The vessel herself is undeployable and made its last trip to sea on 26 April 1998. She is not in active service and is ported at Port Huron, Michigan. The United States Naval Sea Cadet Corps is chartered by US Congress to expand its presence both within the United States and internationally, and offers a selective amount of foreign youth to be able to participate in the program.

The United States Naval Sea Cadet Corps was established by the Navy League of the United States, at the request of the Secretary of the Navy in 1958. In 1962 it was recognized federally to foster interest in the Navy among young men. In 1974, young women were first permitted to join. With parental approval, Roosevelt Sea Cadet Division provides aviation courses for eligible Sea Cadets in Jacksonville, Florida. Participants are unofficially nicknamed "Airmen" instead of the legal name of "Sea Cadet". Upon the completion of the advanced flight courses, the Airmen will be evaluated for promotion. Participation in the aviation courses is not mandatory.

== Mission ==
The mission of the United States Naval Sea Cadet Corps is to build leaders of character by imbuing in our cadets the highest ideals of honor, respect, commitment, and service. — 2025 Mission statement of the United States Naval Sea Cadet Corps

The United States Naval Sea Cadet Corps' three primary areas of responsibility include:

- The development of leadership skills and character among cadets through structured training and mentorship.
- The provision of hands-on training in various disciplines, including field operations and specialized military techniques.
- The preservation and education of naval history and heritage.

Sea Cadet training manuals state: "the primary tools to be used to train cadets and develop their character, military bearing, and self control are leadership (by perfect example, inspiration, and motivation) and mentorship (by instruction and concern for personal development)."

== History ==
=== Origins ===
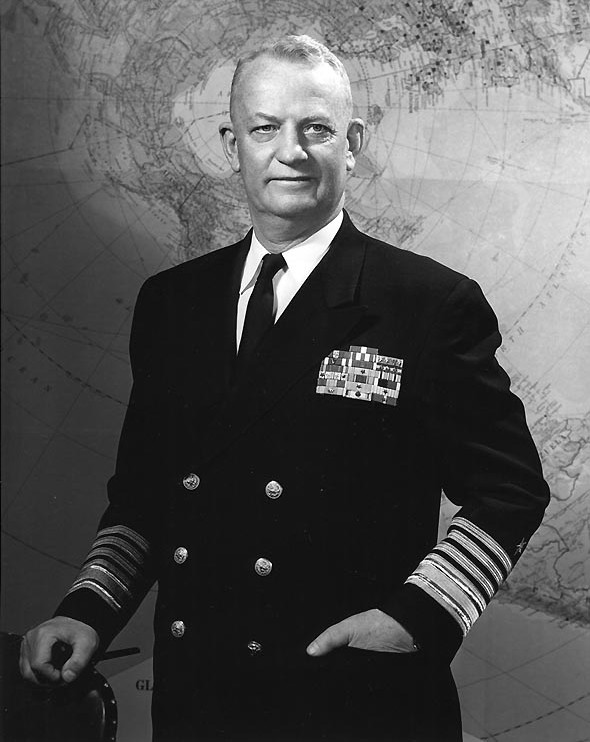
Navy Admiral Arleigh Burke, the founder of the non-profit charitable organization

The United States Naval Sea Cadet Corps was established in 1958 by the Navy League of the United States at the request of the Department of the Navy. It was first vocalized to the Department of the Navy by Admiral Arleigh Burke. The Admiral was inspired after witnessing the formation of sea cadet organizations within other countries. Seeking to establish a strong interest in the United States Navy, the organization received a balanced level of growth in both the number of local units and in active youth participants. In 1962, the organization received recognition from United States Congress through the passage of Public Law 87–655, which signified the organization as a non-profit charitable entity. The legislation delineated the Sea Cadet Corps financial structure and leadership positions, and entitled it by law to the Navy League of the United States and gave it legal rights to the name. The proclaimed goal would be to educate youth about the Navy and would be fully supported by the US Navy. The role of the organization described by United States Congress states: "to encourage and aid American youth to develop an interest and skill in basic seamanship and in its naval adaptations, to train them in seagoing skills, and to teach them patriotism, courage, self-reliance and kindred virtues."

=== 20th century ===
The Sea Cadets operated with shipboard training and received operational and educational experiences in collaboration with active-duty personnel. The USNSCC worked to instill a sense of patriotism and service in youth, aligning its training efforts with 21st century naval operations and exercises. The Sea Cadets served as a tool in fostering early interest in naval careers, allowing a gateway into supplementing several dwindling recruitment pipelines, and building public support for the Navy's mission. One statement, in connection with the Naval Sea Corps mission, was to live a "gang free lifestyle". Instilled with support and the influence of the United States Justice Drug Enforcement Administration (DEA). The DEA's "controversial" late 20th century involvement in USNSCC training was described by US Congress as a "benefit", due to the rise of youth crime and its funding of multiple anti drug campaigns that amounted to an estimated total of over a billion dollars. The DEA's participation in training regimens consisted of education on drug reduction, and drug rehabilitation, still prominent in the 21st century.

=== 21st century ===
The United States Naval Sea Cadet Corps remained an active, Navy and Coast Guard, youth development program operating in the United States and its territories. It continued to be administered by the United States Navy League and remained divided into two organizations, the Navy League Cadet Corps for ages 10 to the end of eighth grade, and the United States Naval Sea Cadet Corps, for youth aged 13 to the end of high school. The USNSCC includes 325 units distributed across 48 states, Guam and Puerto Rico, involving approximately 5,600 Sea Cadets and over 2,600 adult volunteers that contribute to multiple voluntary service hours each year. The Executive director of the USNSCC is responsible for the management and funding of the entire organization. The United States Navy League have established different opportunities in the Great Lakes, and have instilled operating schedules for naval ships to permit a prospect for shipboard training, accompanied by an increase within its recruitment numbers.

== Organization ==
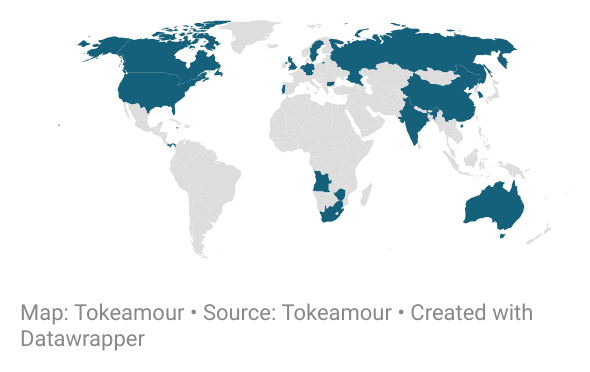
World map showcasing the 21 countries with sea cadet organizations, colored by membership status

The United States Sea Cadet Corps, being a non-profit charitable organization, relies on donations from other organizations. Most of the donations and support come from the Navy and Coast Guard, which provide educational assistance to Sea Cadets both abroad and at their facilities. In 2023, the organization had a reported revenue of 8.6 million dollars in its tax filings, and in 2025, additional grants were provided by the Navy League of the United States. Under international law, the organization identifies itself as a non-military corporation through the International Sea Cadet Association, an alliance of independent sea cadet organizations spanning 21 countries.

=== Local training ===
Each unit is in a classroom setting, with well-trained professional volunteers, and non-commissioned officers of the United States Armed Forces. Associated activities in the organization can include going on field trips and learning naval history and its traditions. All Sea Cadets must be present two weekends a month for field training and at least seventy five percent of all training. For Sea Cadets, their first three months of training is located at their local unit's facility. Later on, Sea Cadets can choose to go on educational tours and more relevant field trips. The organization has an operation known as "the first two weeks" and is a requirement for all Sea Cadets. It must be passed to continue further into training. The location where cadets are usually trained are Navy bases or recruitment centers, and can be other branches of the United States Armed Forces and their recruitment centers as well. After their first several months, the Sea Cadets will go on field trips on boats, and other activities that can include meeting active duty service members of the US armed forces.

=== Support and logistics ===
Several installations and facilities of the United States Armed Forces are located across the states and its territories. Mainly Coast Guard and Navy operated, the installations and facilities serve as to benefit the Sea Cadets on land and receive education away from home. The installations of the United States Naval Sea Cadet Corps are the administrative, recruiting and logistical framework that supports the organization. The Navy League of the United States headquarters, located in Arlington, Virginia manages the organizations financial proceedings, the following of international law and the management of youth safety regulations. Beyond their logistical roles, installations also serve as cultural and ceremonial centers for the Sea Cadets. Hosting events such as change of command ceremonies, promotion boards, and award presentations.

=== Relationship with the United States Coast Guard ===
United States Coast Guard support for the United States Naval Sea Cadet Corps went on to become more prominent over time, and established a more active presence in the 1960s. Whilst the Navy has long served as the primary supporting force, the Coast Guard serves a prominent role in funding as well as their education and is the largest ship provider for the non-profit. The crewmen of the Coast guard are often participants in the training of Sea Cadets among with several Navy personnel. Sea Cadets are strictly enforced to salute all Coast Guard and Navy officers as well as any officer within any other branch of the United States Armed Forces.

== Equipment ==
=== Training equipment ===
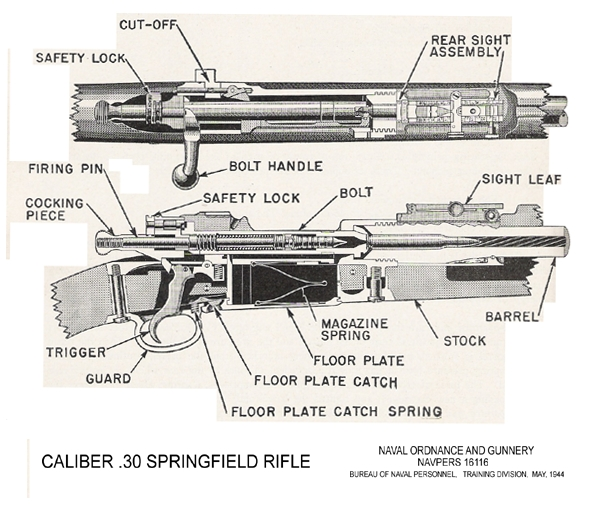
A manual on the internal structure of the M1903 Springfield rifle

The United States Naval Sea Cadet Corps trains on multiple different training vehicles operated by the United States Navy and US Coast Guard. The primary rifle used in training is the M1903 Springfield Bolt-Action, a marching rifle originating from the United States Army in the 20th century. Ships provided by the military include various patrol boats, cutters, rigid-hull inflatable boats, and historically decommissioned naval vessels repurposed for instructional use. The former USNSCS Grayfox was the largest ship operated by the USNSCC and was homeported in Port Huron, Michigan. Throughout, she served as a large platform for shipboard training and maritime education. Originally commissioned as a Torpedo Weapons Retriever by the US Navy in the 1980s, the Grayfox later transferred to the USNSCC where she then was demilitarized into a training ship.

=== Safety equipment ===
Sea Cadets have an assortment of safety equipment, including United States Coast Guard certified personal flotation devices compliant with Title 46 Code of Federal Regulations Part 160. Damage control and firefighting training within the United States Naval Sea Cadet Corps is executed safely by using fire resistant uniforms meeting NFPA 2112 certification, along with self-contained breathing apparatus (SCBA) and other protective gear. The ensemble replicates the protective equipment employed by active-duty service members, thus providing Sea Cadets with exposure to shipboard emergency protocols and maintaining safety standards established by the National Fire Protection Association. Such training occurs in controlled environments replicating naval vessel conditions, emphasizing proficiency in emergency containment, fire suppression, and flooding response.

== Ranks ==
United States Naval Sea Cadet Corps Ranks, organized in order.
Rank	Corresponding course	Training	Time in rate	Time in service	Exam	Approval authority
No Insignia, Must Reach SC-2. SC-1 Seaman Recruit	None	None	None	0 months	Basic Military Requirement Booklet	Recruiting officer
SC-2 Seaman Apprentice (SA)	Polaris advancement course: E-2: Seaman	NSCC recruit training	3 months in NSCC	3 months	Polaris advancement Test: E-2: Seaman	Commanding officer
SC-3 Seaman (SN)	Polaris advancement course: E-3: Seaman	Advanced training (Minimum 7 days)	6 months as SC-2	9 months	Polaris advancement Test: E-3: Seaman	Commanding officer
SC-4 Petty Officer 3rd Class (PO3)	Petty officer: 3rd and 2nd class	Advanced training (Minimum 7 days)	6 months as SC-3	15 months	PO3 exam	Commanding officer
SC-5 Petty Officer 2nd Class (PO2)	Petty officer 3rd and 2nd class NAVEDTRA-14504	Advanced training (minimum 7 days), must have graduated from POLA (Petty Officer Leadership Academy)	6 months as SC-4	21 months	PO2 exam	Commanding officer
SC-6 Petty Officer 1st Class (PO1)	Petty officer 1st class NAVEDTRA-14145	Advanced training (minimum 7 days)	6 months as SC-5	27 months	PO1 exam	NSCC Executive Director
SC-7 Chief Petty Officer (CPO)	Chief petty officer NAVEDTRA-14144	Advanced training (minimum 7 days); Staff RT (effective 1 September 2008); Be 16 years of age	6 months as SC-6	33 months	None	NSCC Executive Director

== Medals ==
List of medals used in the United States Naval Sea Cadet Corps.
Naval Sea Cadet Corps 50th Anniversary Ribbon	Naval Sea Cadet Corps Academic Achievement Ribbon	Naval Sea Cadet Corps Citation Ribbon.
Naval Sea Cadet Corps Outstanding Cadet Award	Naval Sea Cadet Corps Community Service Ribbon	Naval Sea Cadet Corps Color Guard Ribbon
Naval Sea Cadet Corps Drug Reduction Ribbon	Naval Sea Cadet Corps Fifth Year Ribbon	Naval Sea Cadet Corps First Year Ribbon
Naval Sea Cadet Corps International Ribbon	Naval Sea Cadet Corps Honor Ribbon	Fourth Year Ribbon
Naval Sea Cadet Corps Meritorious Recognition Ribbon	Naval Sea Cadet Corps Merit Ribbon	Naval Sea Cadet Corps Marksman Ribbon
Naval Sea Cadet Corps NSCC Escort Officer Ribbon.	Naval Sea Cadet Corps NLUS Youth Ribbon.	Naval Sea Cadet Corps NLCC Distinguished Service Ribbon
Naval Sea Cadet Corps NSCC IEP Ribbon	Naval Sea Cadet Corps NSCC NLCC Service Ribbon	Naval Sea Cadet Corps Physical Fitness Ribbon
Naval Sea Cadet Corps Science Achievement Ribbon	Naval Sea Cadet Corps SAR Citizenship Award	Naval Sea Cadet Corps Recruiting Incentive Ribbon
Naval Sea Cadet Corps Third Year Ribbon	Naval Sea Cadet Corps Staff Cadet Ribbon	Naval Sea Cadet Corps Second Year Ribbon
Naval Sea Cadet Corps Unit Commendation Ribbon	Naval Sea Cadet Corps USCG Bicentennial Unit Commendation Ribbon	Naval Sea Cadet Corps VFW NSCC Ribbon

== See also ==
- Navy League of the United States
- Navy Junior ROTC
- Combined Cadet Force
- Cadets (youth program)
- International Sea Cadet Association
- Sea Cadets (various nations' Sea Cadet organizations)
- Sea Scout
- U.S. Naval Academy
- U.S. Merchant Marine Academy
- U.S. Coast Guard Academy
- Civil Air Patrol
- Naval Reserve Officers Training Corps
