= Silver fox =

Silver fox or Silver Fox may refer to:

== Animals ==
- Silver fox (animal), a melanistic form of the red fox

== Arts and entertainment ==
=== Literature ===
- The Silver Fox, an 1897 novel by E. Œ. Somerville and Martin Ross
- The Silver Fox, a 1921 Broadway play by Cosmo Hamilton
- The Silver Fox, a 1983 novel by Barbara Delinsky, under the pen name Bonnie Drake
- The Silver Fox, a 1997 novel by Rosemary Hayes
- Piero Taruffi: The Silver-Fox, a 2006 book by Prisca Taruffi concerning Piero Taruffi
- The Silver Fox, a 2017 novel by Deborah Smith

=== Other ===
- The Silver Fox, a 1975 album by Charlie Rich
- Silver Fox (character), in Marvel Comics
- "Silver Fox", a song by RJD2 from the 2002 album Deadringer

== Military ==
- Operation Silver Fox, a German-Finnish World War II military campaign
- BAE Systems Silver Fox, an unmanned aerial vehicle
- Silver Fox, a suspected Chinese government-backed hacking group

== People with the nickname ==
- Ayaz Memon (born 1955), Indian sports writer
- Basdeo Panday (born 1933–2024), former actor and Prime Minister of Trinidad and Tobago
- Anderson Cooper (born 1967), CNN News anchor
- Barbara Bush (1925–2018), former first lady of the United States
- Peter Costa (poker player) (born 1956), British poker player
- Mel Judah (born 1947), Australian poker player
- Ed Kelly (soccer) (born 1948), Irish-American former soccer player
- Jim Northrup (baseball) (1939–2011), American Major League Baseball player
- Jesse Petty (1894–1971), American Major League Baseball pitcher
- Charlie Rich (1932–1995), American singer
- Ray Knight (born 1952), American baseball player, manager and broadcaster
- David Pearson (1934–2018), NASCAR racing driver
- Duke Snider (1926–2011), American baseball player
- Robert L. Stephens (1921–1984), United States Air Force test pilot
- David Taylor (snooker player) (born 1943), English snooker player
- Eduard Shevardnadze (1928–2014), Soviet politician and former president of Georgia
- Chase Utley (born 1978), American baseball player

== Other uses ==
- Silver Fox Island, Newfoundland, Canada
- Regina Silver Foxes, a former Canadian Junior "A" ice hockey team
- Silver Foxes, a former name of the Kent State Golden Flashes football team
- Silver Fox, an LNER Class A4 steam locomotive
- Silver Fox, in Miwok mythology
