= Andrew Lennon =

United States Navy admiral

Andrew C. Lennon
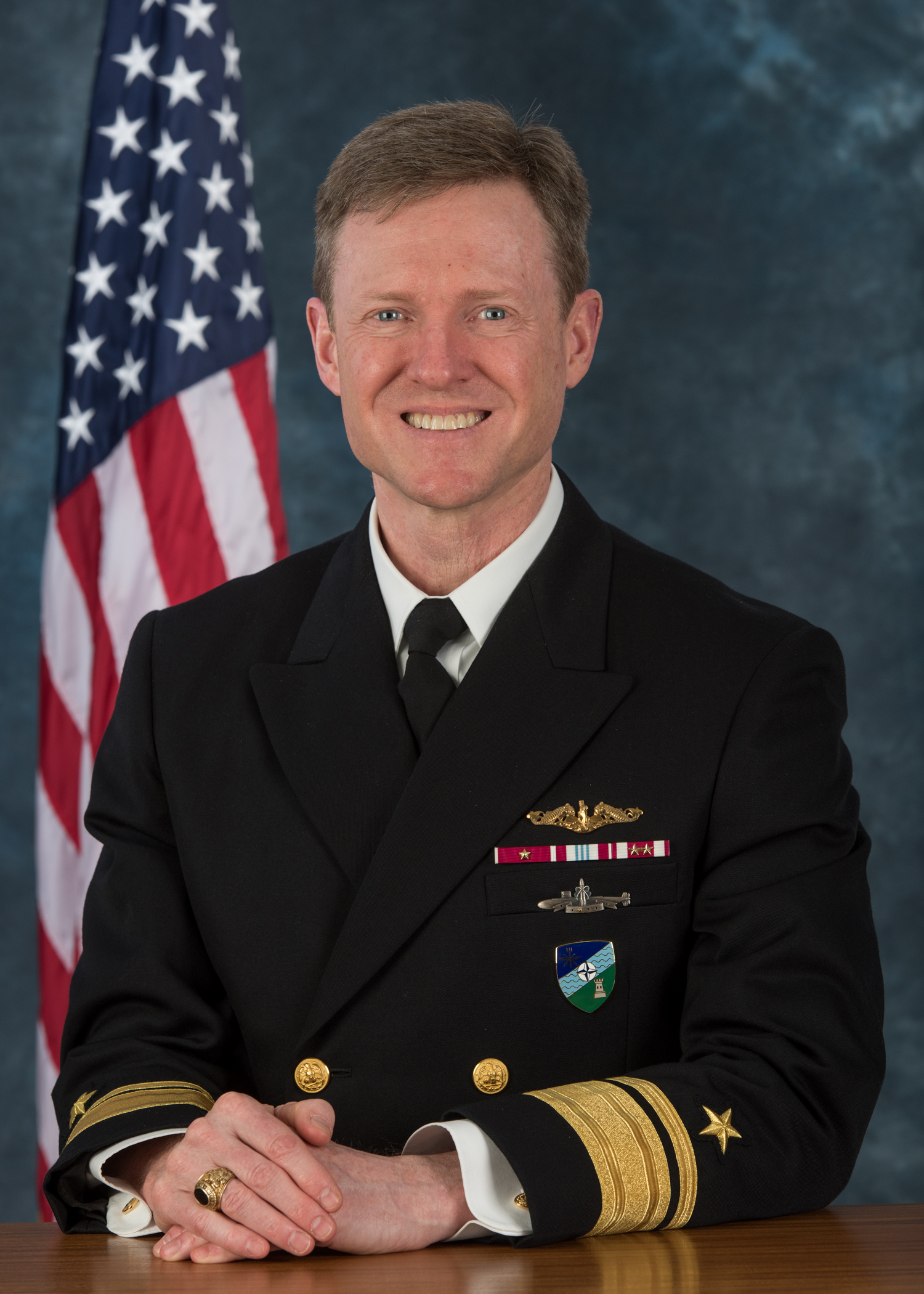
- Official portrait of RADM Lennon, 2019
- Born: Andrew Charles Lennon c. 1965; New York, U.S.
- Education: U.S. Naval Academy (BS); George Washington Univ. (MS); Johns Hopkins Univ. (MS)
- Military career
- Allegiance: United States
- Branch: United States Navy
- Service years: 1987–2021
- Rank: Rear admiral (upper half)
- Awards: Def. Superior Service Medal; Legion of Merit (2); Def. Meritorious Service Medal; Meritorious Service Medal (3)

Andrew Charles Lennon (born c. 1965) is a retired United States Navy rear admiral. He was NATO Commander of Submarines from 2017 to 2019. Since 2021, he has been executive director of the U.S. Naval Sea Cadet Corps.

Military offices
Preceded by Matthew Zirkle	NATO Commander of Submarines; 2017–2019	Succeeded by E. Andrew Burcher
