= Navy League of the United States =

American non-profit organization

- Seal of the Navy League
- Founded: 1902
- Founder: Theodore Roosevelt
- Type: Non-profit support organization
- Location: Arlington, Virginia
- Website: www.navyleague.org

The Navy League of the United States, commonly referred to as the Navy League, is a national association with nearly 50,000 members who advocate for a strong, credible United States Navy, United States Marine Corps, United States Coast Guard and U.S. Merchant Marine.

It was founded in 1902, at the suggestion of Theodore Roosevelt. The Navy League describes itself as "a civilian organization dedicated to the education of our citizens, including our elected officials, and the support of the men and women of the sea services and their families."

== Publications ==
Seapower magazine and the Almanac of Seapower are the official publications of the Navy League. Seapower is published monthly and focuses on maritime defense news. The Almanac of Seapower is published annually in January.

== Center for Maritime Strategy ==
The Center for Maritime Strategy was founded in January 2022 to be non-partisan think tank and research institution dedicated to studying maritime issues and their context within wider American national security policy. The think tank is housed inside the Navy League of the United States and conducts policy research and advocacy efforts across a broad spectrum of issues that impact the United States’ position as a maritime nation.

== See also ==
- Navy League Cadet Corps
- United States Naval Sea Cadet Corps
- National security of the United States
- National security directive (generally highly classified presidential directives issued for the National Security Council (NSC))
