= Royal Naval Dockyard, Bermuda =

Base of the Royal Navy in the Western Atlantic

- Bermuda
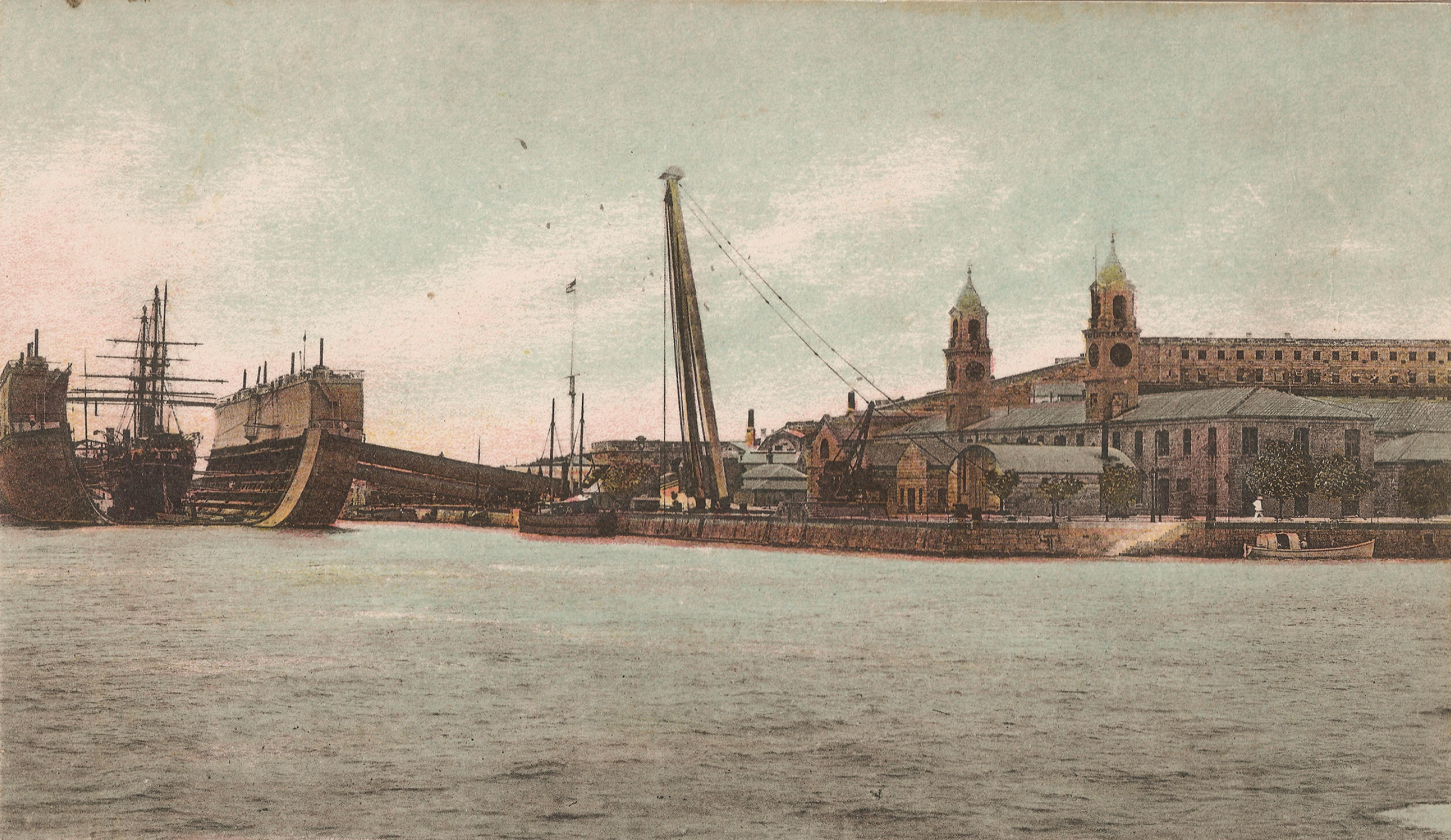
- 1869 view of the Royal Naval Dockyard, with the floating drydock Bermuda to the left

Site information
- Type: Royal Naval Dockyard
- Operator: Royal Navy
- Controlled by: Navy Board (1795–1832); Board of Admiralty (1832–1951); Board of Admiralty (1951–1964) and Navy Board (1964–1982) and Government of Bermuda 1951–1982; Navy Board and West End Development Corporation 1982–1995

Site history
- In use: 1795–1995
- Battles/wars: See list: American War of 1812; First World War; Second World War; Cold War

Garrison information
- Occupants: North America Squadron

HMD Bermuda (Her/His Majesty's Dockyard, Bermuda) was the principal base of the Royal Navy in the Western Atlantic between American independence and the Cold War. The Imperial fortress colony of Bermuda had occupied a useful position astride the homeward leg taken by many European vessels from the New World since before its settlement by England in 1609. French privateers may have used the islands as a staging place for operations against Spanish galleons in the 16th century. Bermudian privateers certainly played a role in many English and British wars following settlement, with its utility as a base for his privateers leading to the Earl of Warwick, the namesake of Warwick Parish, becoming the most important investor of the Somers Isles Company. Despite this, it was not until the loss of bases on most of the North American Atlantic seaboard (following US independence) threatened Britain's supremacy in the Western Atlantic that the island assumed great importance as a naval base (the attendant Bermuda Garrison of the British Army existed primarily to protect the naval base). In 1818 the Royal Naval Dockyard, Bermuda officially replaced the Royal Naval Dockyard, Halifax, as the British headquarters for the North America Station and its successors.

As prior to 1959, under section 87 of the Naval Discipline Act 1866 (29 & 30 Vict. c. 109), only sailors on the books of a commissioned naval vessel were subject to naval discipline, naval personnel assigned to shore duties were listed administratively as crew members of depot ships, originally usually hulks of old warships. In Bermuda, the depot ship was HMS Terror from 1857 to 1897, which was replaced by the former troopship HMS Malabar (renamed HMS Terror in 1901). The former HMS Malabar was sold in 1918, following which the name HMS Malabar was applied to the Casemates Naval Barracks in the dockyard as a stone frigate under command of the Captain in Charge to which the shore personnel at Bermuda, whether belonging to the dockyard, to outlying naval facilities (such as Admiralty House, Bermuda, Royal Naval Air Station Bermuda, or the Royal Naval wireless station (from 1961, NRS Bermuda) at Daniel's Head), or to minor vessels assigned to the dockyard for local use, were administratively assigned. As a consequence, HMS Malabar was often used interchangeably with HM Dockyard Bermuda or Royal Naval Dockyard Bermuda, and has been often mistaken as referring only to specific subordinate naval facilities in Bermuda, such as the wireless station at Daniel's Head or the Royal Naval Air Station. After the Bermuda dockyard was reduced to a base in the 1950s, the part that continued to operate as a naval base was commissioned as HMS Malabar until 1995.

== Post 1783 ==
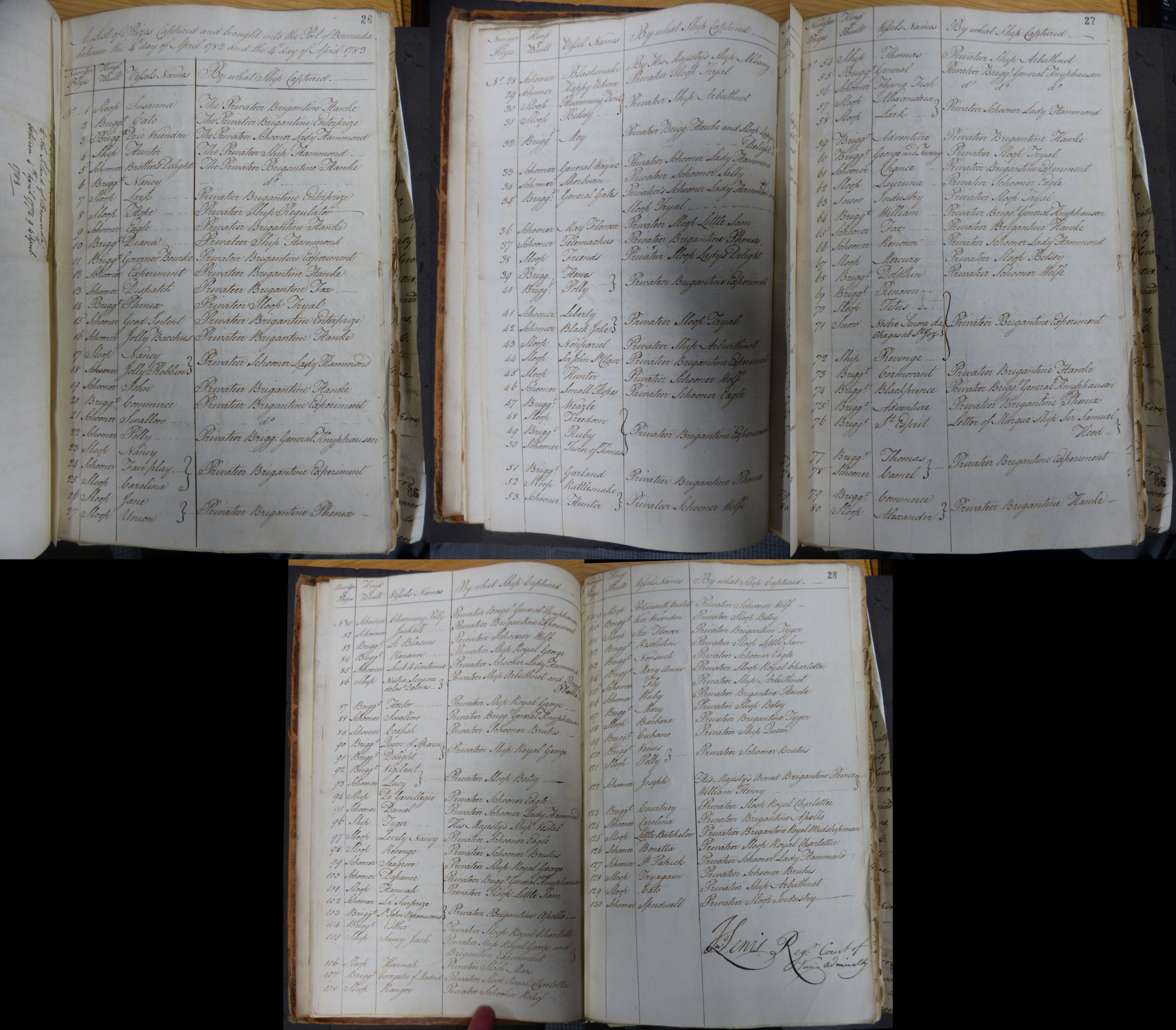
130 prizes captured and brought into Bermuda between 1782-04-04 and 1783-04-04

In the decades following American independence, Britain was faced with two threats to its maritime supremacy. The first was French, as Napoleon battled Britain for military, political, and economic supremacy in Europe, closing continental ports to British trade. He also unleashed a storm of privateers from the French West Indies in an attempt to cripple British trade in the New World. The Royal Navy was hard-pressed in Europe, and unable to release adequate forces to counter the menace of the privateers. In any case, multi-decked ships-of-the-line were designed to battle each other in slow-moving, opposing lines. However many guns they might have to bring to bear, they were not able to run down, or outmanoeuvre the small privateers.

The second threat was American. The first successful English colony in the North America, Jamestown, Virginia, which Bermuda was settled as an extension of, was intended to exploit the abundance of timber on that continent. This was at a time when Britain, and much of Europe, had long been stripped almost clear of trees. American timber had been one of the enablers of Britain's ascendancy to maritime supremacy, and, by 1776, a significant part of Britain's merchant fleet was made up of American ships. Despite its own, brief, naval dispute with Napoleon, the United States took full advantage of its neutral position in the wars between Britain and France in allowing its merchant fleet to trade with France and the countries under its influence, and the British Government was enraged by what it saw as America's failure to support it in combating a common threat. The British Admiralty was also enraged by the practice of American merchant and naval vessels to poach sailors from the Royal Navy at a time when its manpower was stretched to the limit. The US also had its own interest in breaking Britain's supremacy on maritime trade, and from the first days of the Republic it has often claimed to champion free trade.

== First naval establishment in East End ==
The Royal Navy sought to counter the threat of French privateers in the New World by commissioning its own light vessels, built along the lines of traditional Bermuda sloops. The first three vessels commissioned from Bermudian shipyards were 200 ton, 12-gun sloops-of-war, ordered in 1795, and commissioned as HMS Dasher, HMS Driver and HMS Hunter. Over the next fifteen years, the Admiralty would commission a great many more vessels from Bermudian builders, manned by locally recruited officers and crews. Although the first were intended to counter the privateer menace, Bermudian sloops ultimately became 'advice' vessels, using their speed and handling to evade enemies, and carrying communications and vital freight around the globe. They were also used for reconnaissance and maintaining pickets. In addition to ships commissioned by the Admiralty, Bermudian merchant vessels were also bought up and commissioned for this purpose. The most famous was undoubtedly HMS Pickle, which carried the news of British victory back from Trafalgar.

The Royal Navy began to invest into Bermudian real-estate in 1795. Very early, it began to buy islands at the West End of the chain, and in the Great Sound, with the view to building a naval base and dockyard. Unfortunately, at that time, there was no known channel wide and deep enough to allow large naval vessels to gain access to the Great Sound. A naval hydrographer, Thomas Hurd, spent a dozen years charting the waters around the Colony, and eventually found the Channel through the reefs, which is still used today by vessels travelling to the Great Sound and Hamilton Harbour.

Initially, the Royal Navy bought and developed property in and around the then capital of St. George's, at the East End. These included Convict Bay, which became a Royal Canadian Naval Base, HMCS Somers Isles, during the Second World War, and the brick building now housing the Carriage House Museum, and Restaurant. Once Hurd's Channel had been discovered, however, the Royal Navy soon relocated all of its facilities to the West End.

== Relocation to West End ==
In 1788 the Admiralty commissioned a nautical survey of Bermuda, with a view to establishing a new naval base there. Lt. Thomas Hannaford Hurd was ordered to undertake this, in the company of Lt. Andrew Fitzherbert Evans as his Assistant Surveyor. In 1794, Rear Admiral George Murray was appointed to command the North American squadron. He was sent a chart from Hurd's survey, and quickly saw the potential benefits of a base in Bermuda. The passage Hurd had surveyed through the reef into a new anchorage was named as "Murray's anchorage". On 18 May, Murray and his captains visited the town of St. George, where they were welcomed with a great reception. In the following week, Hurd and Murray explored the new anchorages, including other possible entrances, and also westwards to Grassy Bay and Ireland Island, which Murray regarded as an ideal location for a dockyard. Admiral St Vincent, First Lord of the Admiralty commented that Hurd's accurate survey had convinced him that the arsenal should be transferred from Halifax to Bermuda.

Captain Andrew Fitzherbert Evans was approached to be the first Commodore in March 1811. He accepted in April 1811. He sailed aboard the Guerriere in July 1811. Evans used the Tourterelle as his flagship, but later flew his pennant from Ruby. Evans was married to a Bermudian in 1794. His wife and children lived there from 1794 to 1808, hence his links to the island. Ruby was recommissioned in October 1810. From April to June 1811, she was fitted out at Chatham as depot ship for Bermuda. On 25 July 1811, she left Portsmouth and sailed to Bermuda. During 1812, HMS Ruby was used as the Receiving Ship at Bermuda. The ship remained in Bermuda and was broken up there in April 1821.

Numerous islands at the West End, and in the Great Sound were used for various purposes, but the core of the base, the Dockyard, began to take shape on Ireland Island, at the North West extremity of the archipelago. Initially, local labourers, free or enslaved, were sought to carry out the construction. With most working-age Bermudian men being skilled workers, involved in seafaring or shipbuilding, local labour proved scarce and expensive. (The Admiralty had acknowledged Bermuda's reliance on its merchant seamen by exempting them from impressment into the Royal Navy, to which all other British seamen were liable).

In view of attitudes found amongst the Bermudian population to manual labour, and the high cost of local labour, the labour force for the start of the work was, apart from specialist Bermudian artisans, built up from slaves and ex-slaves from various sources. The hired Bermudian slaves led unusually independent lives, finding their own work and bargaining with prospective employers for wages and conditions. Alongside them were ex-slaves taken off intercepted ships and who, by the Slave Trade Act 1807, should not have been treated as slaves but were considered still slaves by dockyard officials. Also, from 1813, refugees from American slavery of the War of 1812 who had opted for employment at Bermuda rather than armed service or resettlement in Canada, and who suffered similarly from the dockyard officials’ attitudes, finding their situation inferior to that of the hired Bermudan slaves, and who at the end of the War found themselves sent to Canada, despite their original choice of location, to make way for that part of the Corps of Colonial Marines that had been recruited on the Atlantic coast.

Service afloat in the Royal Navy was not generally popular amongst seamen from any part of the British Realm, forcing the navy to rely on impressment, especially in North America. HMS Whiting was notorious in the Maritimes in 1805 for impressing locals. Although she had been built in Bermuda and had a Bermudian officer, Bermudians were exempted from impressment.

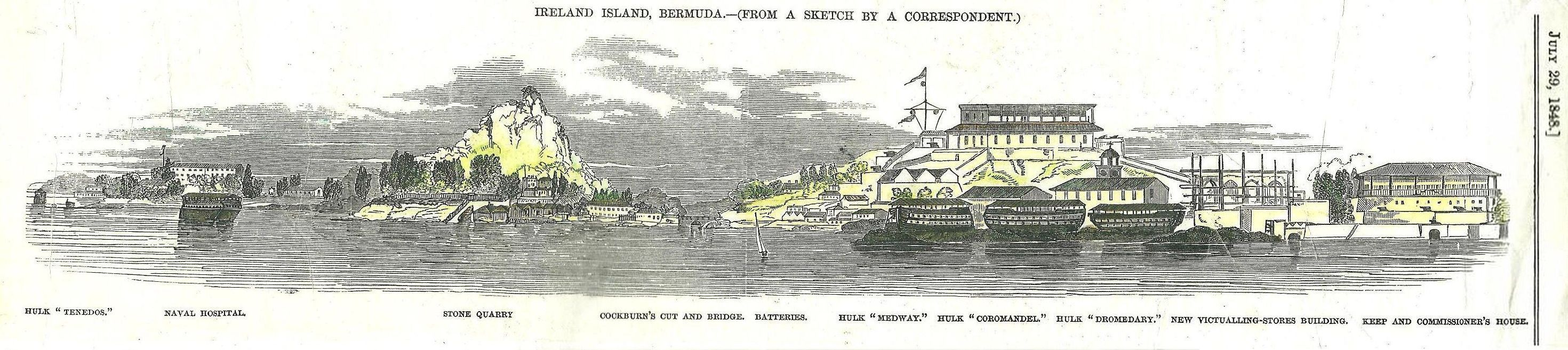
1848 Woodcut of HMD Bermuda, Ireland Island, Bermuda.

== American War of 1812 ==
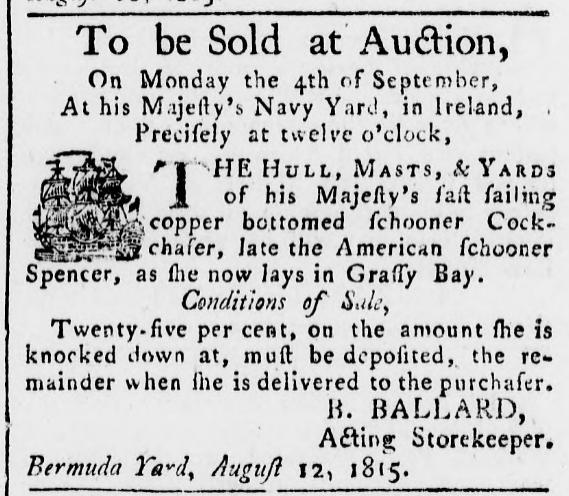
12 August 1815 advertisement by HM Dockyard Bermuda of auction of HMS Cockchafer published 19 August 1815 in The Bermuda Gazette

One of the first Naval actions of the War was the capture of the Bermuda-built, HMS Whiting, in a US port.

During the War, the British blockade of American ports was orchestrated from Bermuda, and a squadron based in Bermuda was active in the Chesapeake from February 1813 until the end of the War, British forces briefly occupying Kent Island in 1813 and establishing a base on Tangier Island in 1814, where the Royal Navy recruited from among refugee slaves a Corps of Colonial Marines. Other refugees were first brought to Bermuda in May 1813, where they were employed in the construction of the new Dockyard on Ireland Island in the company of hired artisans, both free and enslaved, and finally to Nova Scotia and New Brunswick for resettlement.

In August, 1814, British forces sailed from the Dockyard to carry out the Chesapeake campaign, including an attack on Washington, D. C., resulting in the Raid on Alexandria, the Battle of Bladensburg, the Burning of Washington, and an attempted assault on Baltimore, Maryland, in the Battle of Baltimore. When the forces returned to Bermuda, they brought with them two sets of portraits of King George III, and his wife, Queen Charlotte, taken from a public building in Washington; these portraits hang, today, in the House of Assembly of the Bermudian Parliament and the Cabinet Building, both in the City of Hamilton.

Bermudian privateers also played a notable part in the war, capturing 298 American vessels.

== 19th century ==
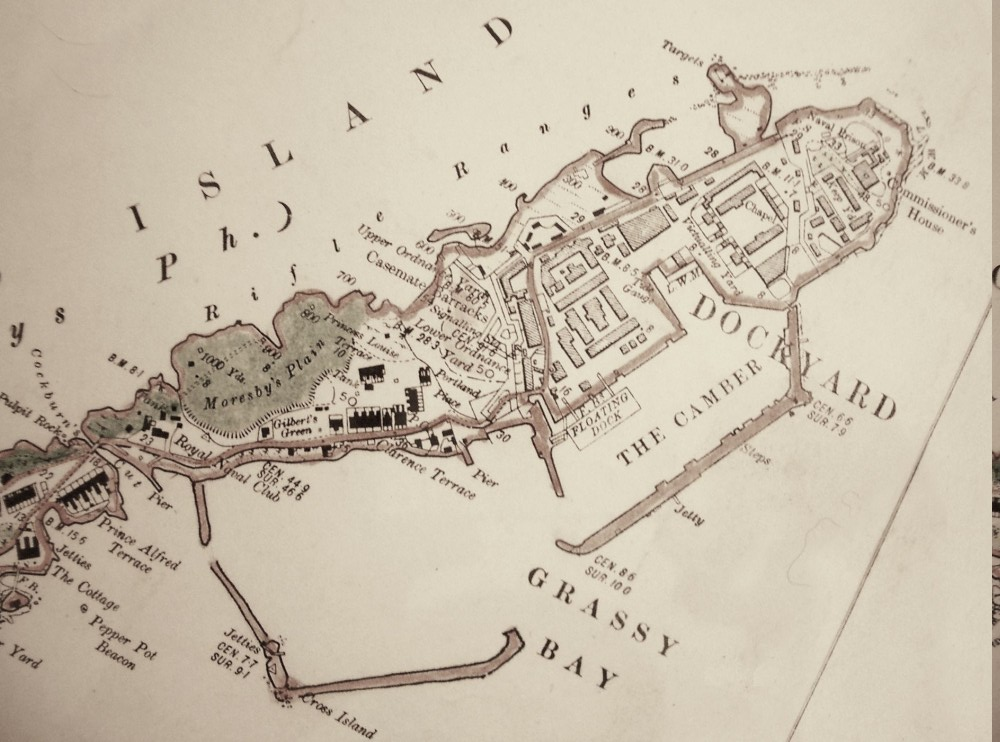
HMD Bermuda circa 1899, showing the new South Yard under construction (left) and the old fortified North Yard (right)

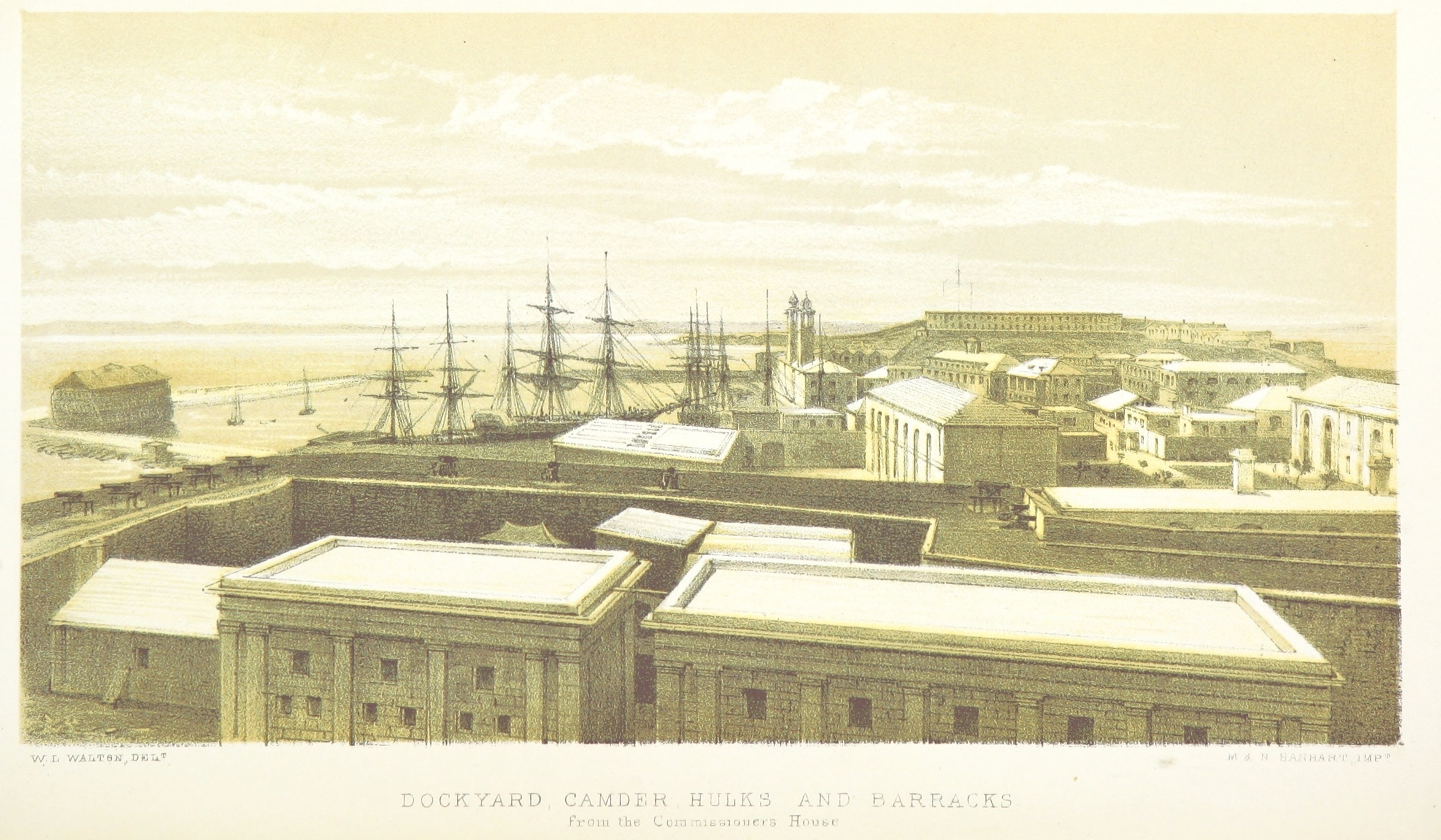
Keep, Dockyard, Camber, Hulks and Casemates Barracks, 1857

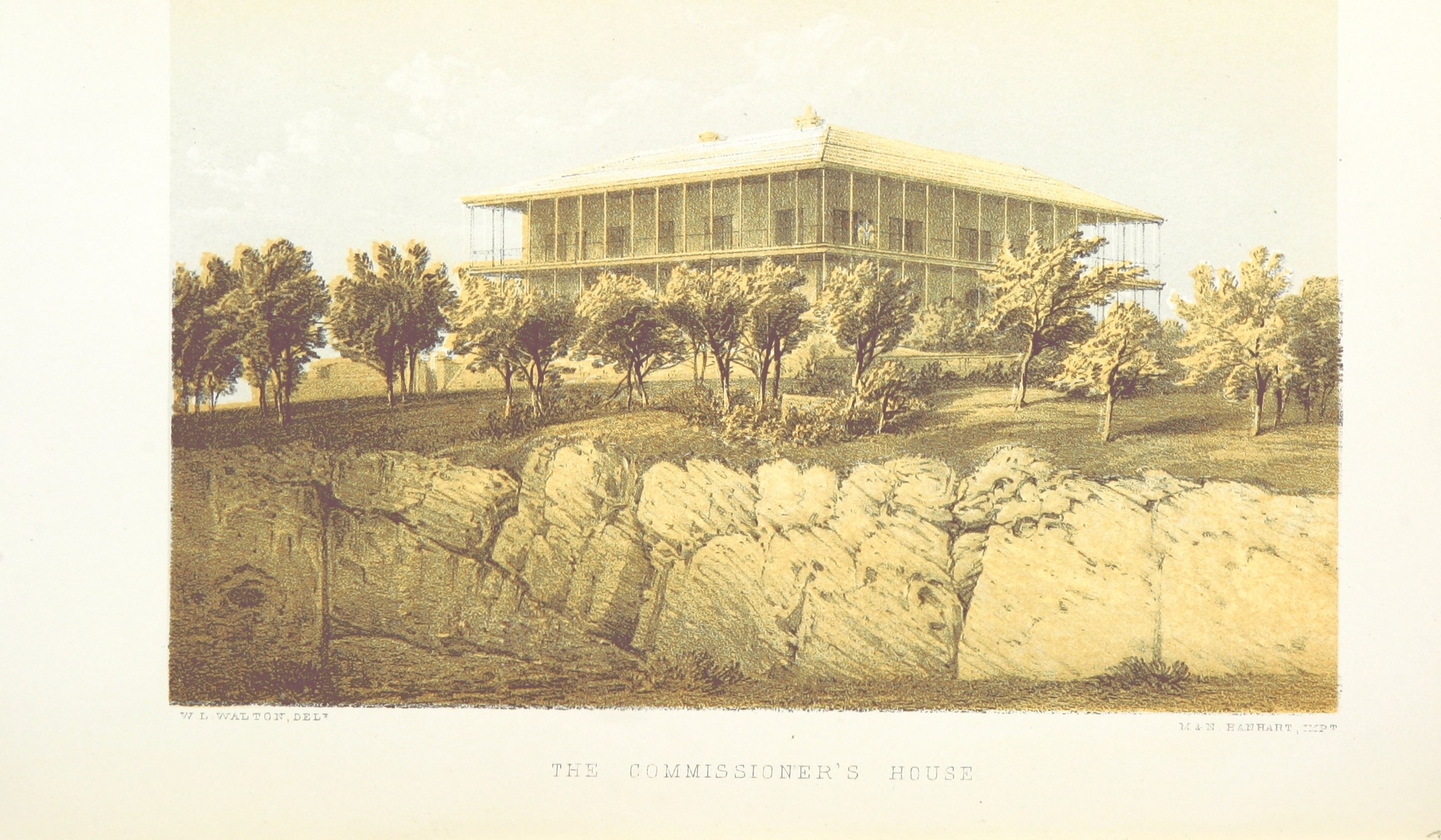
The Commissioner's House in 1857

In 1814 Bermuda had a Royal Marine detachment commanded by Captain William Ramsay. In 1815 the men of the Corps of Colonial Marines, six companies, along with a Royal Marine staff company commanded by Major Andrew Kinsman, were brought to Bermuda to man the garrison and to continue the construction of the Dockyard. With the reduction in naval budgets that came with peace, the Admiralty refused to be responsible for them any further. The men rejected a government order for them to be transferred to the West India Regiment, but accepted in the end the government's alternative offer of settlement in Trinidad as free independent farmers. Their last day of pay at Bermuda was 15 July 1816, when they were taken, together with their families, to Trinidad where they were formally disbanded on 20 August and taken to their new settlements to occupy grants of land. The consequent depletion of the construction workforce was partially made good in 1823 by the first importation of British convicts.

After the War, the Navy concentrated on the building of the Dockyard, while the Army began its own buildup of fortifications, coastal artillery, and infantry garrisons to defend the Naval Base, as the British Government began to view Bermuda more as a base than as a colony.

Ten carpenters based at Portsmouth Dockyard were despatched to Bermuda in 1814. After three years, they were given the option to return home, or to remain in Bermuda with a promotion and an increase of pay.

The absence of suitable labour for the continuation of the dockyard works over the following six years led to the decision late in 1822 to use convicts shipped from Britain and Ireland to carry out most of the original phase of building at the base, the first arriving in 1823. Admiralty House in Bermuda, at that time, was still in the East End, at Mount Wyndham, above Bailey's Bay.

The convicts brought in from the United Kingdom to serve as manual labourers included many Irishmen, including participants in the ill-fated Young Irelander Rebellion of 1848 and Nationalist journalist and politician John Mitchel. Conditions for the convicts were harsh, and discipline was draconian. In April 1830, convict James Ryan was shot and killed during rioting of convicts on Ireland Island. Another five convicts were given death sentences for their parts in the riots, with those of the youngest three being commuted to transportation for life. In 1849, convict James Cronin, on the hulk Medway at Ireland Island, was placed in solitary confinement from the 25th to the 29th for fighting. On release, and being returned to work, he refused to be cross-ironed. He ran onto the breakwater, brandishing a poker threateningly. For this, he was ordered to receive punishment (presumably flogging) on Tuesday, 3 July 1849, with the other convicts aboard the hulk assembled behind a rail to witness. When ordered to strip, he hesitated. Thomas Cronin, his older brother, addressed him and, while brandishing a knife, rushed forward to the separating rail. He called out to the other prisoners in Gaelic and many joined him in attempting to free the prisoner and attack the officers. The officers opened fire. Two men were killed and twelve wounded. Punishment of James Cronin was then carried out. Three hundred men of the 42nd Regiment of Foot, in barracks on Ireland Island, responded to the scene under arms.

In addition to Mitchel, notable convicts sent to Bermuda included Irish painter William Burke Kirwan.

In 1851 Master stone carver Charles Thomas Thomas travelled to North America. He was appointed foreman of works with the Works Department of the Royal Navy, responsible for development of the strategic Royal Naval Dockyard, Bermuda. By the time the first phase of development was complete, in the 1860s, the convict establishment was no longer seen as politically expedient. The last convicts were withdrawn in 1863, returned to Britain on the Bermudian merchant clipper, Cedrine (which was wrecked on the Isle of Wight, on its maiden voyage, costing Captain Thomas Melville Dill, grandfather of the parliamentarian and Attorney General of the same name, his Master's certificate).

The primary limitation of Bermuda as a Dockyard was the porosity of its limestone sandstone, which prevented construction of a proper drydock. From 1869, this problem was remedied with a floating dry dock. This, and its successors, was a large hull, with a U-shaped cross-section. It could be partly submerged by filling ballast tanks with water, so that a ship might be brought in and braced into position. The tanks were then emptied to lift the ship out of the water for repairs below its waterline.

When the second phase of development began at the end of the 19th century, there was still a shortage of Bermudians willing to work as common labourers, and the Admiralty resorted to importing labour from British West Indian islands (which were suffering economic hardship due to the loss of the sugar industry, following American victory in the Spanish–American War). This began a century of sustained immigration into Bermuda from the West Indies which has had profound social and political effects.

The Dockyard served as the base for a succession of Royal Naval organisations, including the North America and West Indies Squadron. A fleet of C-class cruisers and smaller vessels was based there in the 1930s. In both World Wars, Bermuda served as a staging area for trans-Atlantic convoys.

== First World War ==
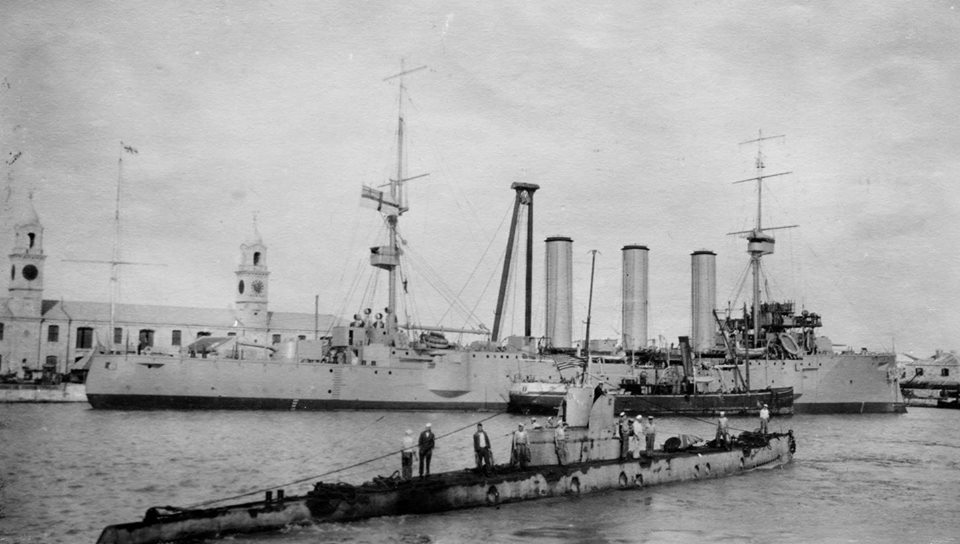
HMS Cornwall and a United States Navy submarine at the Royal Naval Dockyard circa 1918

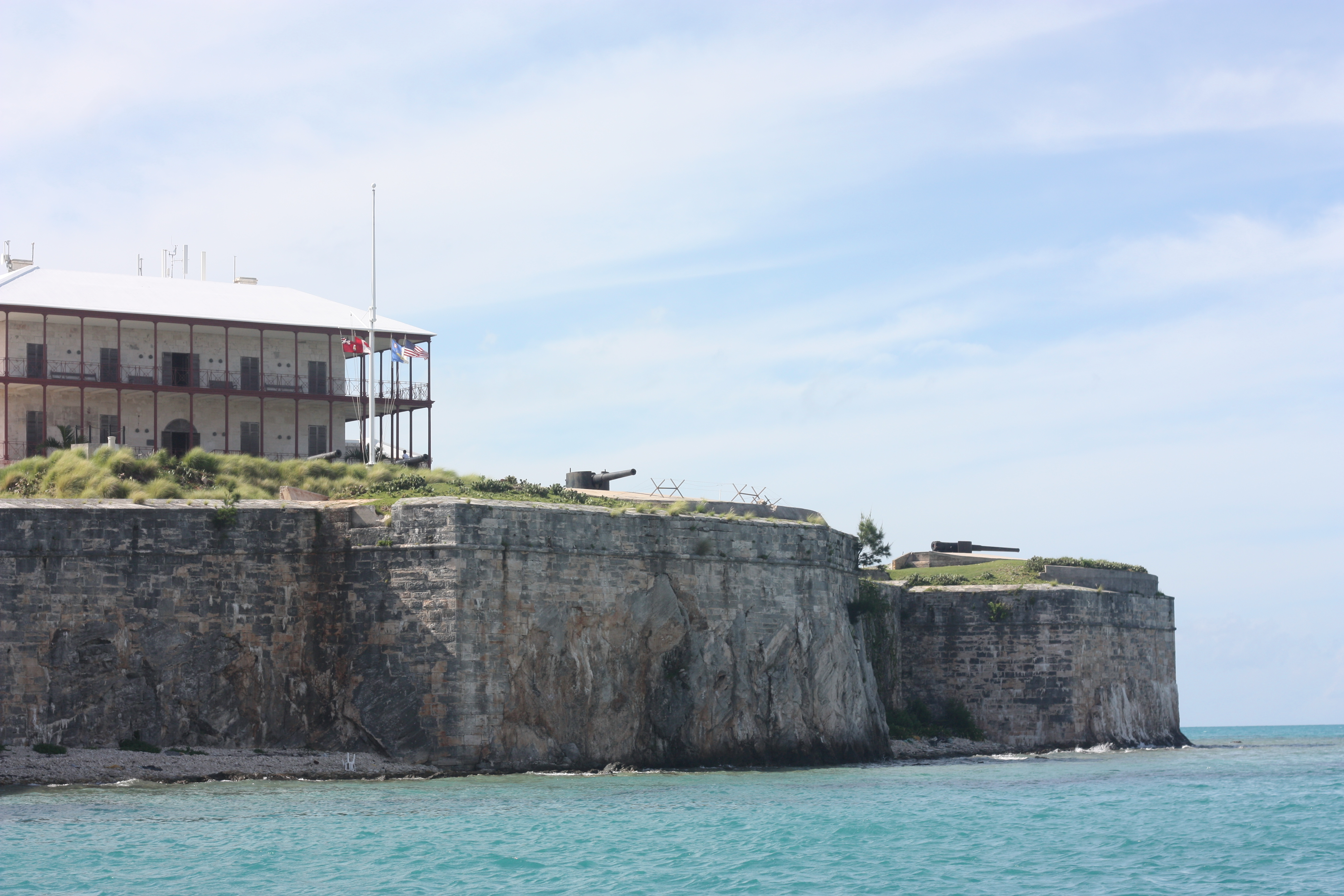
Bastions C and D of the Keep, with two BL 6-inch (152 mm) Mk VII guns.

During the First World War, the Dockyard and its vessels, intended to dominate the American coastline and the West Indies, found themselves absorbed with the role of protecting Allied merchant shipping the length and breadth of the Atlantic.

The vessels of the North America and West Indies Squadrons were employed to track down German surface raiders, and in escorting the convoys that were assembled at Bermuda before crossing the Atlantic. As would be the case in the Second World War, the primary threat to trans-Atlantic Allied shipping was the menace of German submarines. Ships from the dockyard also took part in the Battle of the Falkland Islands.

== Second World War ==
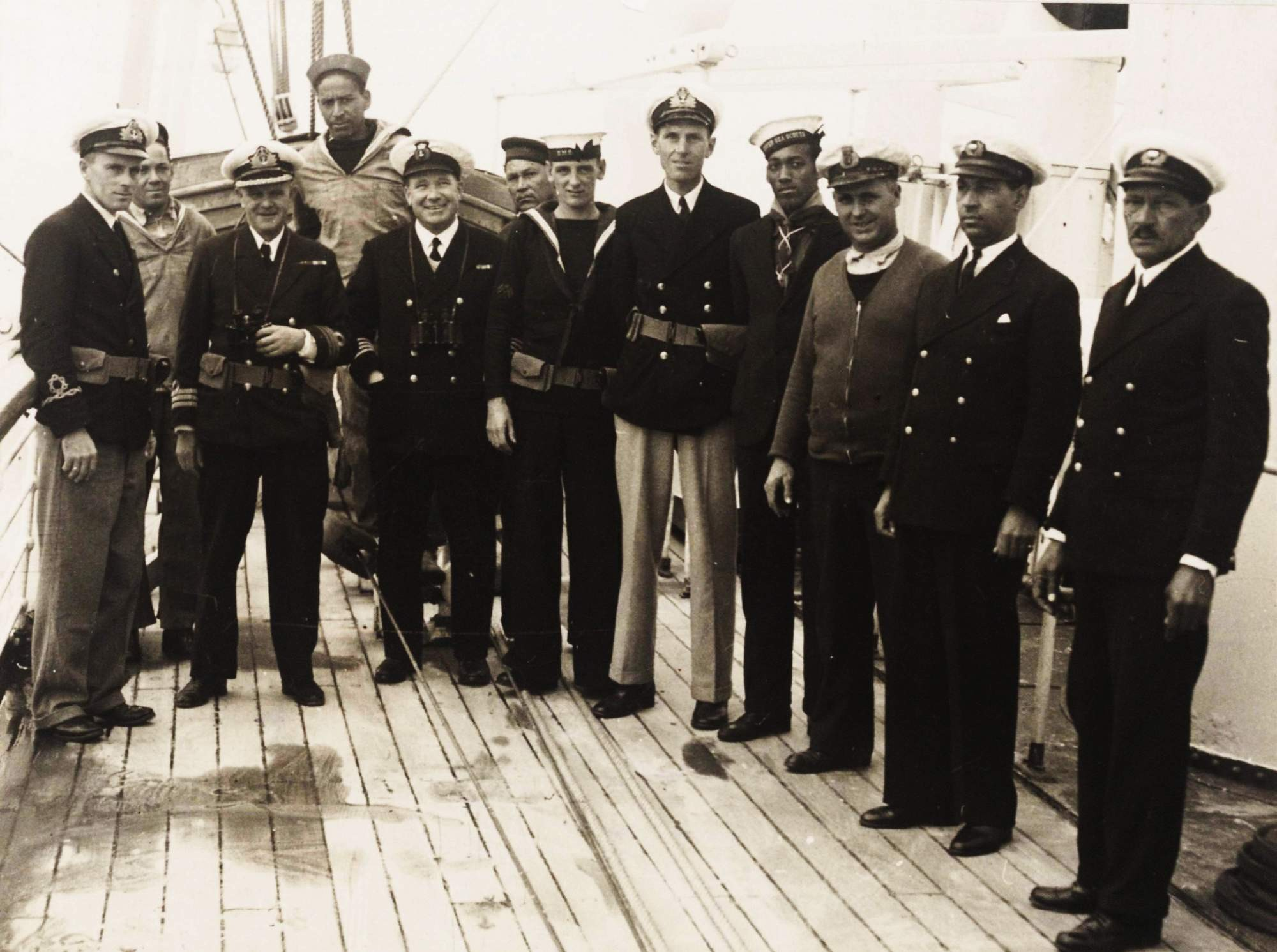
The crew of HMS Castle Harbour in Royal Naval Examination Service use

During the Second World War, again, the naval base in Bermuda organised trans-Atlantic Convoys. Ships would arrive at Bermuda singly, where Charles Fairey's converted yacht, HMS Evadne, patrolled beyond the reefline, and the converted tugboat, HMS Castle Harbour, and later HMS Sumar, crewed by local ratings, patrolled nearer to shore and transported the pilots (who steered the visiting ships through the treacherous reefs that protected the harbours and anchorages) and the naval examination officer tasked with inspecting arriving vessels. Most convoys from Bermuda (coded BHX), once assembled, joined at sea with convoys originating at Halifax, Nova Scotia (coded HX), before crossing the Atlantic.

The Fleet Air Arm's Royal Naval Air Station Bermuda on Boaz Island (before the Second World War, it had been located in the North Yard of the dockyard), nominally an aircraft repair and replacement facility without its own aircrews, provided air patrols during the early years of the war, using Supermarine Walrus flying boats flown by naval pilots from ships at the dockyard, or pilots from the Royal Air Force and the Bermuda Flying School on Darrell's Island. Once the US Navy began flying air patrols from Darrell's Island in 1941, however, the Fleet Air Arm's patrols ceased. With Bermuda becoming the working-up area for Allied destroyers newly commissioned on the Atlantic seaboard of North America (specifically, those of the US Navy, and lend-lease destroyers from the United States for the Royal Navy and Royal Canadian Navy), the Fleet Air Arm formed 773 Fleet Requirements Unit at Bermuda on the 3 June 1940, equipped with Blackburn Roc target tugs, which towed targets for anti-aircraft gunnery practice by Allied vessels working-up at Bermuda, as well as for a United States Navy anti-aircraft gunnery training centre that operated on shore at Warwick Parish for the duration of the war. The target tugs operated at first from Boaz Island as floatplanes, and from 1943 also from the runway at the United States Army's Kindley Field.

Although Bermuda was a naval base, her warships were normally spread far-and-wide across the Atlantic, unable to protect the base or the colony. Early in the war German battleships, operating as commerce raiders, created some concern of Bermuda's vulnerability to naval bombardment (especially when Convoy HX 84 – which included ships from Bermuda – was attacked by the German cruiser Admiral Scheer in November 1940), but the island was never attacked, and the threat of German surface vessels and their aircraft quickly faded.

Bermuda was to provide the namesakes for three other Royal Naval vessels, other than HMS Castle Harbour, during the War, specifically the cruiser HMS Bermuda, the destroyer HMS Hamilton, and HMS Queen of Bermuda, a prewar luxury liner taken up from trade and commissioned as an armed merchant cruiser.

== Redesignation from dockyard to naval base ==
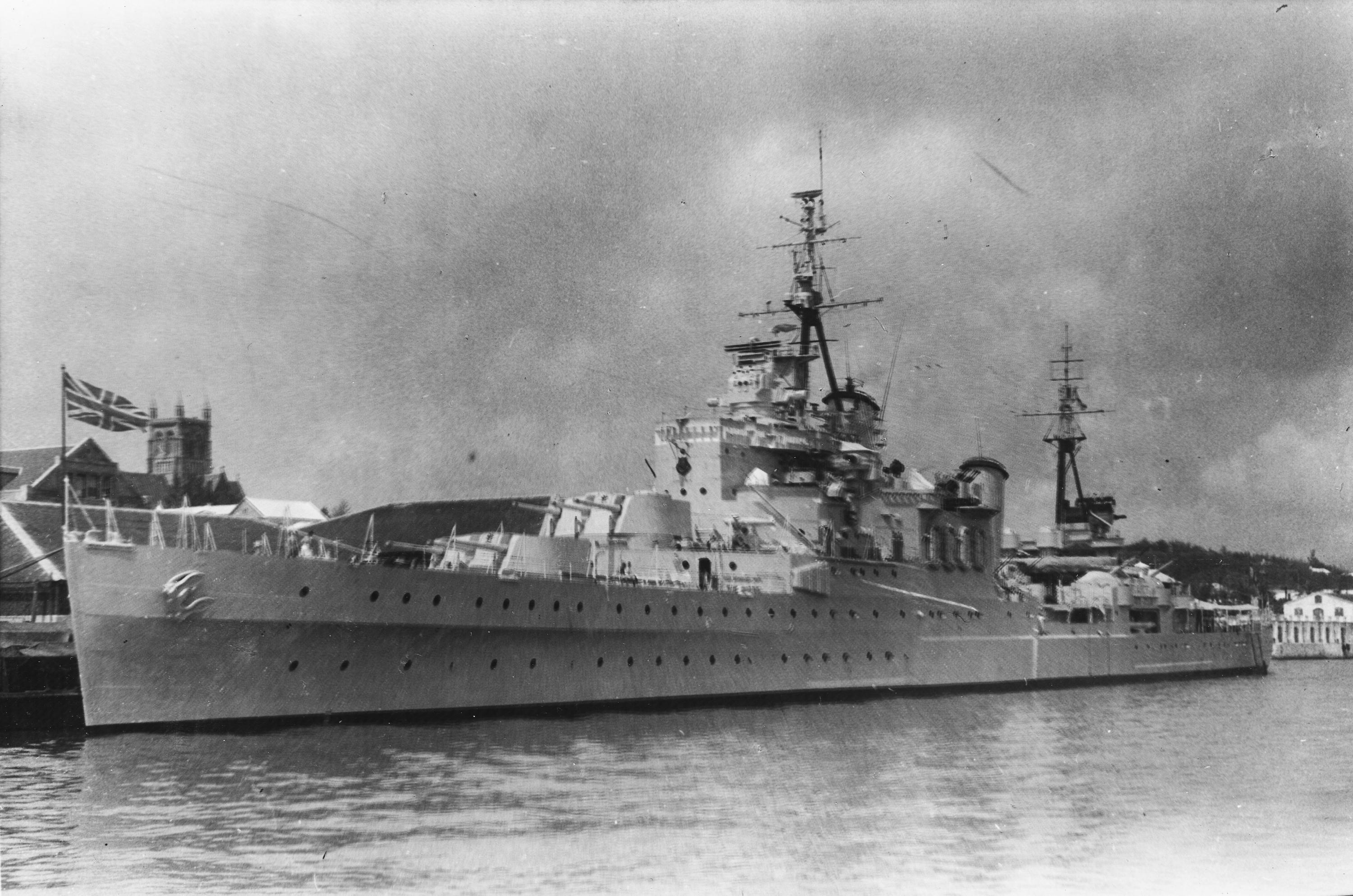
HMS Sheffield at City of Hamilton, Bermuda, for 10 June 1948, King's Birthday ceremony.

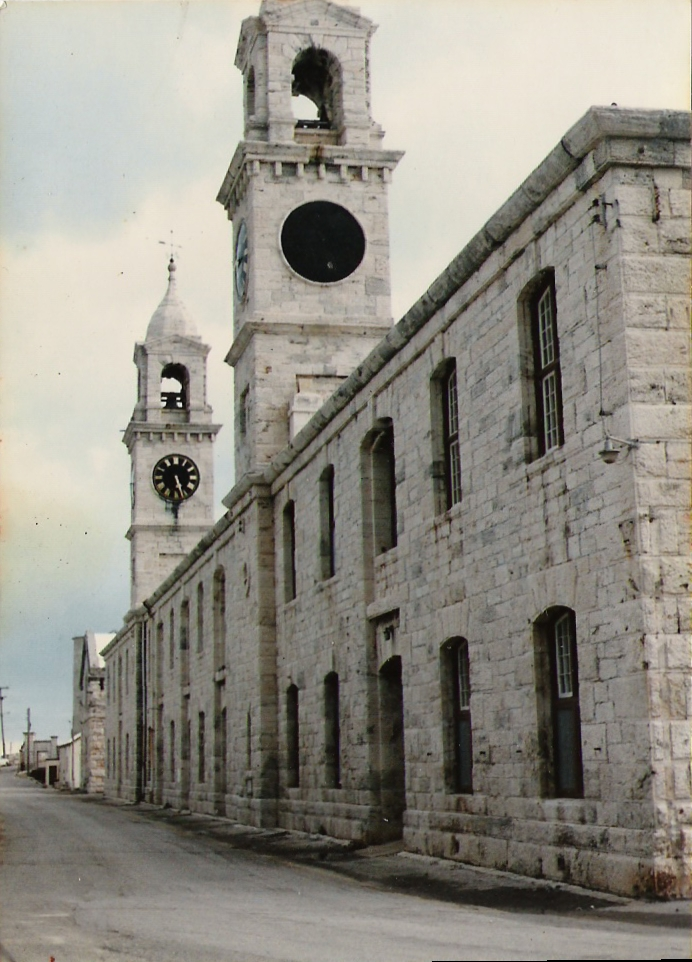
The Storehouse

After the Second World War, with the former primary threat in the region, the United States, having been an ally in both World Wars, and a continuing ally under NATO, the naval base in Bermuda diminished rapidly in importance to the Admiralty.

The US Navy had operated from a base on White's Island (officially listed as its Base 24), in Hamilton Harbour during the last year of the First World War, servicing submarine hunters, submarines and other vessels that travelled across the Atlantic to the European theatre of conflict in convoys of one to two dozen vessels. Many of these vessels had also made use of the Royal Navy's facilities at HM Dockyard. In addition to White's Island, the United States operated a supply station on the British Army's formerly secret munitions depot, Agar's Island. Both US facilities were closed following the cessation of hostilities.

During the Second World War, the United States had been permitted to build a US Naval Operating Base (serving both ships and seaplanes) and a US Army airfield in the colony under free 99-year leases. This had been agreed before Britain and France declared war on Germany and set into motion before the US had actually entered the war, but (along with the establishment of a US Army garrison with artillery and infantry elements) had the effect of placing most of the responsibility for guarding Bermuda into American hands, thereby freeing British forces to be redeployed elsewhere.

With little remaining interest in policing the world's waterways, and with the American bases to guard Bermuda in any potential war with the Warsaw Pact or other enemies, the Royal Navy closed most of the Dockyard facilities in 1958 (a process which had begun with the removal of the large floating drydock, AFD 5, in 1951 (the smaller AFD 48 remained)), with most of the Admiralty's landholdings in Bermuda (along with all of the British Army's properties) being transferred to the local government for £750,000.

The South Yard of the Dockyard itself was retained as HM Naval Base, Bermuda, commissioned as HMS Malabar (see below). It continued to be the base of the North America and West Indies Station, with the Commander-in-Chief, America and West Indies Station, at the Admiralty House, Bermuda, until 29 October 1956, when the position was abolished. To partially replace this appointment, Captain George Hunt (Royal Navy officer) aboard HMS Bigbury Bay was appointed the first Senior Naval Officer, West Indies, as a Commodore, reporting directly to the Commander-in-Chief, Home Fleet, in the UK. A diminishing number of escorts was subsequently based at Bermuda until the 1970s, although the base was no longer capable of carrying out repairs to vessels based there.

== HMS Malabar and SNOWI ==
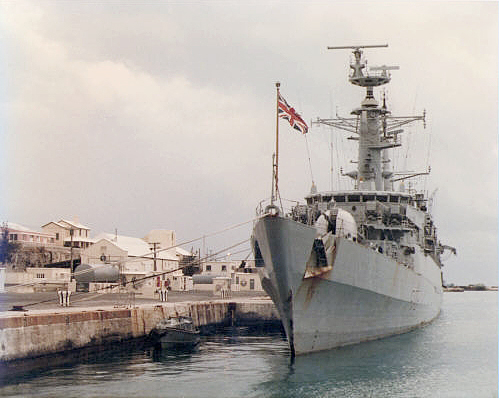
HMS Ambuscade at the South Yard (HMS Malabar) in 1988

The 1951 closure of the dockyard was actually a reduction of its status to a base, with the disposal of most Admiralty land holdings in Bermuda. The South Yard Berthing Area continued to be maintained as a base, under the command of the Resident Naval Officer (RNO), for the squadron of the America and West Indies Station (which ceased to be a separate station with the 1956 abolishment of the Commander-in-Chief America and West Indies, though the diminishing squadron remained based in Bermuda until the 1970s) but, no longer equipped with a drydock, ships based at Bermuda needing major repairs or refit were obliged to cross the Atlantic to Portsmouth). The base was nameless until commissioned as HMS Malabar on 1 June 1965 (it was also designated HM Naval Base Bermuda (HMNB Bermuda)), until it, too, closed in 1995, following the end of the Cold War. The closure of HMS Malabar marked the end of 200 years of permanent Royal Naval establishment in Bermuda.

Following the withdrawal of the Admiral (the Commander-in-Chief, America and West Indies) in 1956, the Senior Naval Officer West Indies (SNOWI) was also based at Bermuda, with the shore headquarters of SNOWI occupying Moresby House (originally built in the 1899s as the residence of the civilian Officer in Charge, Works) along with the RNO, until the role was abolished in 1976. SNOWI served as Island Commander Bermuda in the NATO chain of command, reporting to Commander-in-Chief, Western Atlantic as part of Allied Command Atlantic. After 1962, the same officer also occupied the office of Commander British Forces Caribbean Area (CBFCA), with overall command of all British naval and military forces in the Caribbean. This office lapsed in 1969. Among other difficulties that had beset SNOWI in the role of CBFCA, Bermuda, being over 1,500 kilometres (930 mi) North of the Virgin Islands, had been found to be too remote from the West Indies to be a useful command centre for handling any contingency situation that arose there. However, after 1969, SNOWI retained responsibility for providing general military advice to Governors, Heads of Missions, and Administrators in the West Indies, with the exception of British Honduras.

The South Yard Berthing Area of the Royal Naval Dockyard was commissioned on 1 June 1965, as HMS Malabar, under the command of the Resident Naval Officer (RNO), with the headquarters of both SNOWI and the RNO at Moresby House (built in the 1890s as the residence of the dockyard's Officer in Charge, Works). The name HMS Malabar causes considerable confusion in relation to the Bermuda naval base. At least one vessel attached to the HM Dockyard, and three separate shore establishments have used the name. The shore establishments included one at the Commissioner's House, at the north of the Keep, and, later, the Royal Naval Air Station on Boaz Island that operated during the Second World War. Both of these were establishments within the larger active naval base, and the name HMS Malabar never applied to the entirety of the HM Dockyard Bermuda.

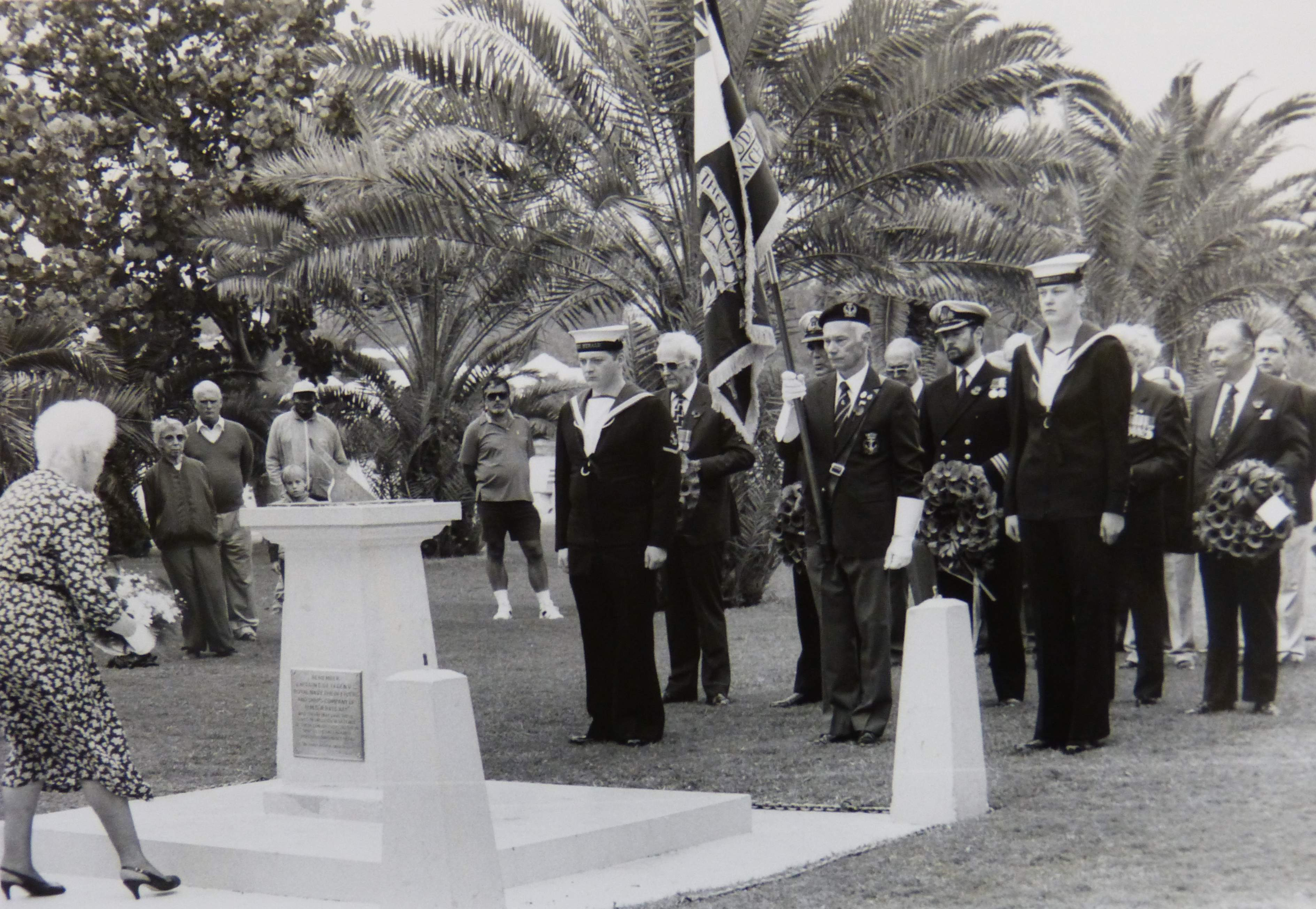
Remembrance Day ceremony at the HMS Jervis Bay memorial at Albouy's Point, in the City of Hamilton.

In December, 1967, the position of RNO Bermuda was abolished, with its duties passing to SNOWI's secretary and SNOWI taking over command of HMS Malabar. As SNOWI was frequently in the West Indies, he was unable to effectively command HMS Malabar, and a lieutenant-commander was consequently appointed to the roles of commanding officer of HMS Malabar and RNO in 1971. On 1 April 1976, the post of SNOWI was abolished. The Bermuda-based Station Frigates were withdrawn and replaced with a West Indies Guard Ship (now called Atlantic Patrol Task (North)), a role which was rotated among the frigates of the fleet, which took turns operating extended patrols of the West Indies. The West Indies Guard Ship normally stops at Bermuda only on the way to and from taking up its station in the West Indies, and usually provides the Royal Naval detachment which takes the senior position in Bermuda's parade each Remembrance Day (a practice that began before the closure of HMS Malabar). While still designated a base, HMS Malabar was effectively reduced to a supply station that supported Royal Naval vessels transiting through Bermuda or temporarily operating in the area, such as for the annual Standing Naval Force Atlantic (STANAVFORLANT) exercises. By the 1990s, other than HMS Malabar, the Royal Naval establishment in the former North-America and West Indies Station had been reduced to the West Indies Guard Ship and a supporting Royal Fleet Auxiliary vessel.

The former Royal Navy wireless facility at Daniel's Head was used by the Royal Canadian Navy from 1963 as Naval Radio Station Bermuda (NRS Bermuda), re-named Canadian Forces Station Bermuda (CFS Bermuda) in 1968. Both HMS Malabar and CFS Bermuda were closed, along with the three US Navy facilities in Bermuda, in 1995.

== Current status ==
After the closure of most of the base as an active naval dockyard in 1957 (excluding HMS Malabar, the shore establishment which operated until 1995), the base fell into a state of disrepair. Storms and lack of maintenance caused damage to many buildings. Beginning in the 1980s increased tourism to Bermuda stimulated interest in renovating the dockyard and turning it into a tourist attraction. Currently, cruise ships regularly land at the dockyard during summer months (cruise lines call this place King's Wharf). The West End Development Corporation (WEDCO) was formed in 1982 as a quango to oversee the development of the former Admiralty lands (other than those still in use by the Royal Navy, or by HM Prisons) on Ireland, Boaz, and Watford islands. To serve these visitors, several former warehouses have been turned into artists shops and a pedestrian mall has opened in the clock tower building. The keep area is now the site of the National Museum of Bermuda and the Dolphin Quest attraction. There are also several restaurants on site. Money is still being raised to repair the remaining damaged buildings and build a second dock to attract additional cruise ships. As of April 2011 the mega-cruise ship dock has been constructed.

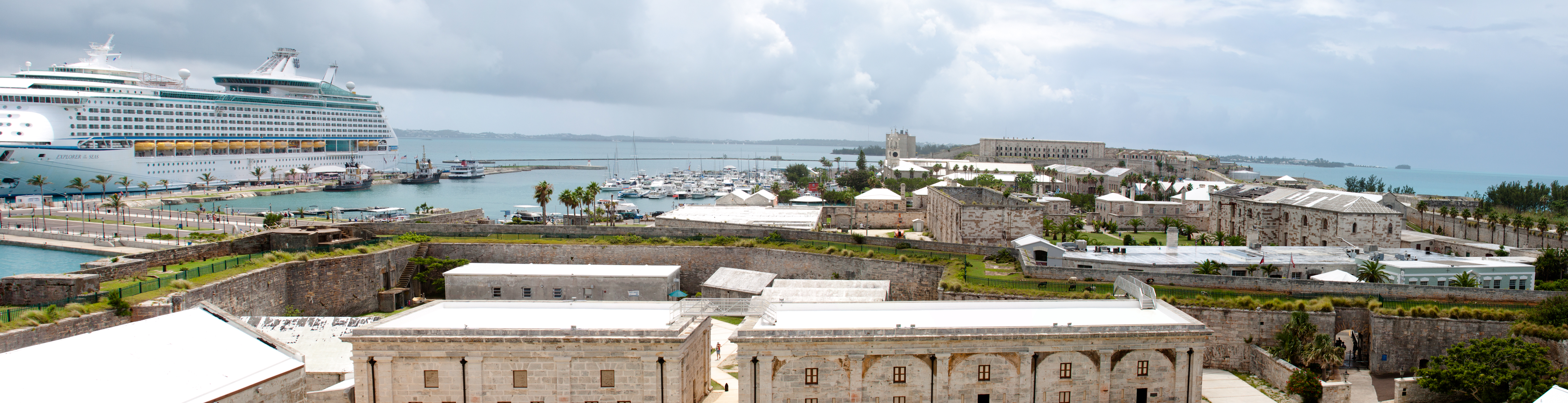
The Royal Naval Dockyard viewed from the Commissioner's House as of August, 2011. Ship docked is Explorer of the Seas.

== Gallery ==
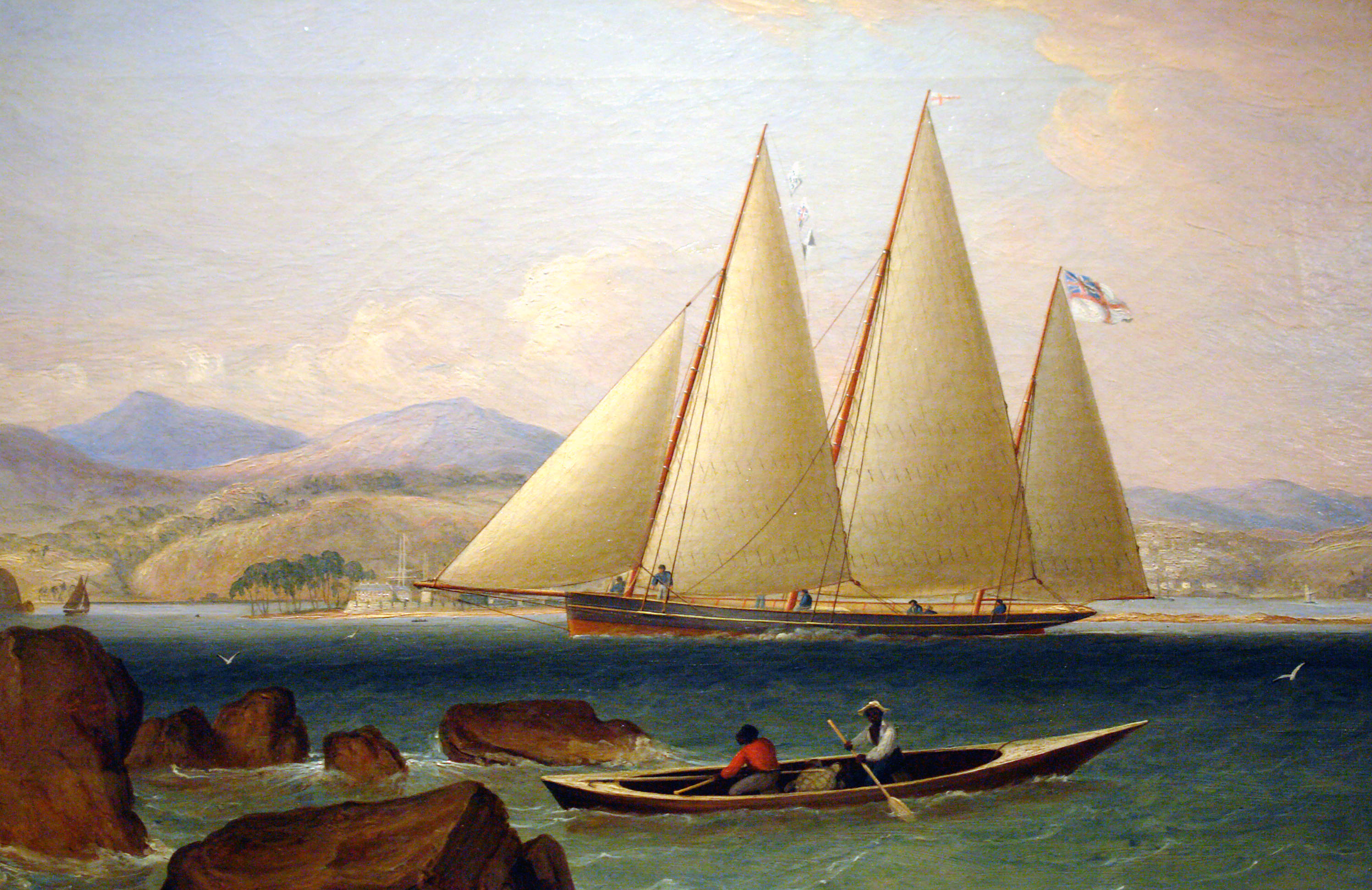
1831 painting of a three-masted Bermuda sloop of the Royal Navy, entering a West Indies port.

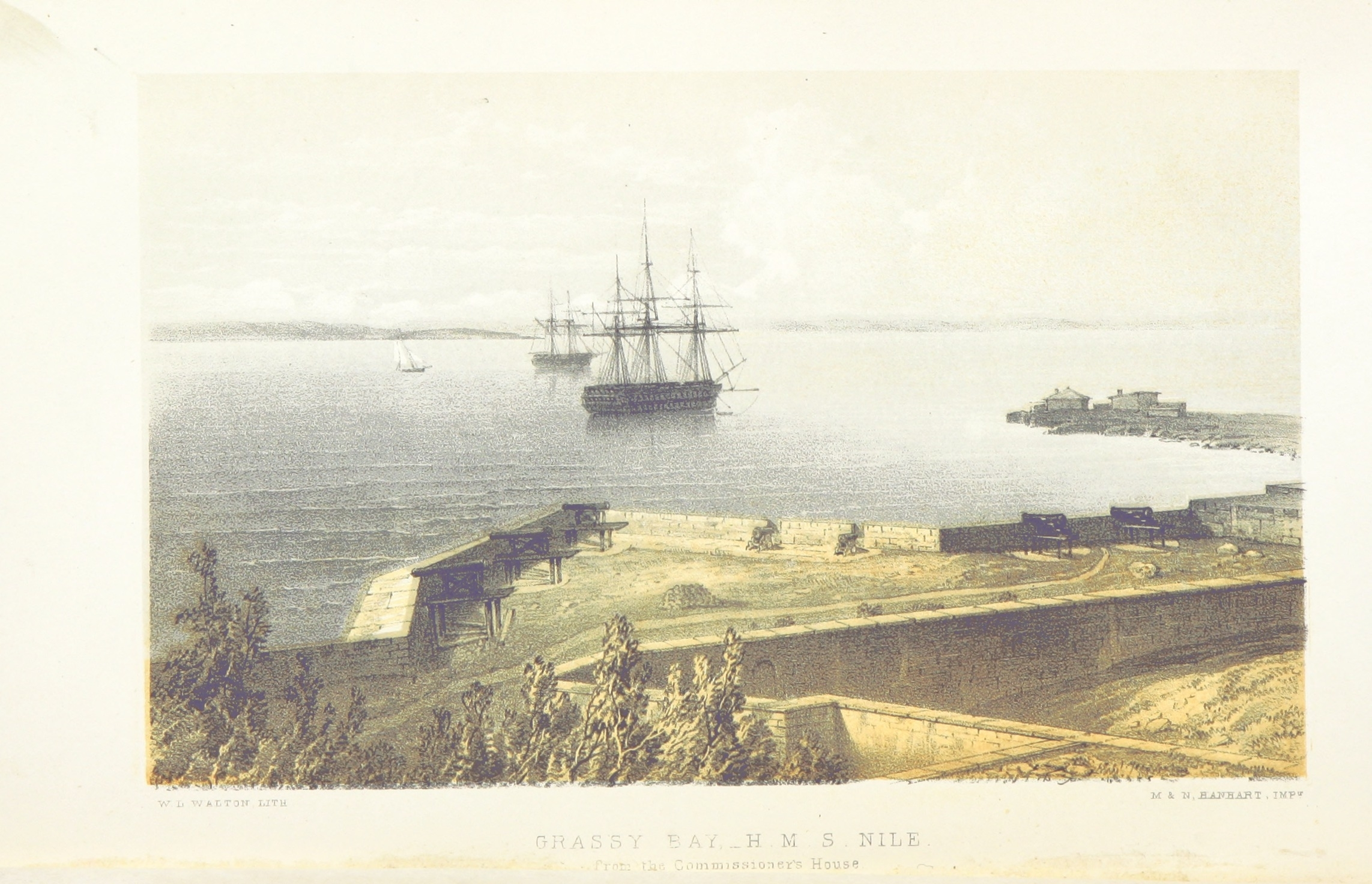
HMS Nile, anchored at Grassy Bay, as seen from the Commissioner's House

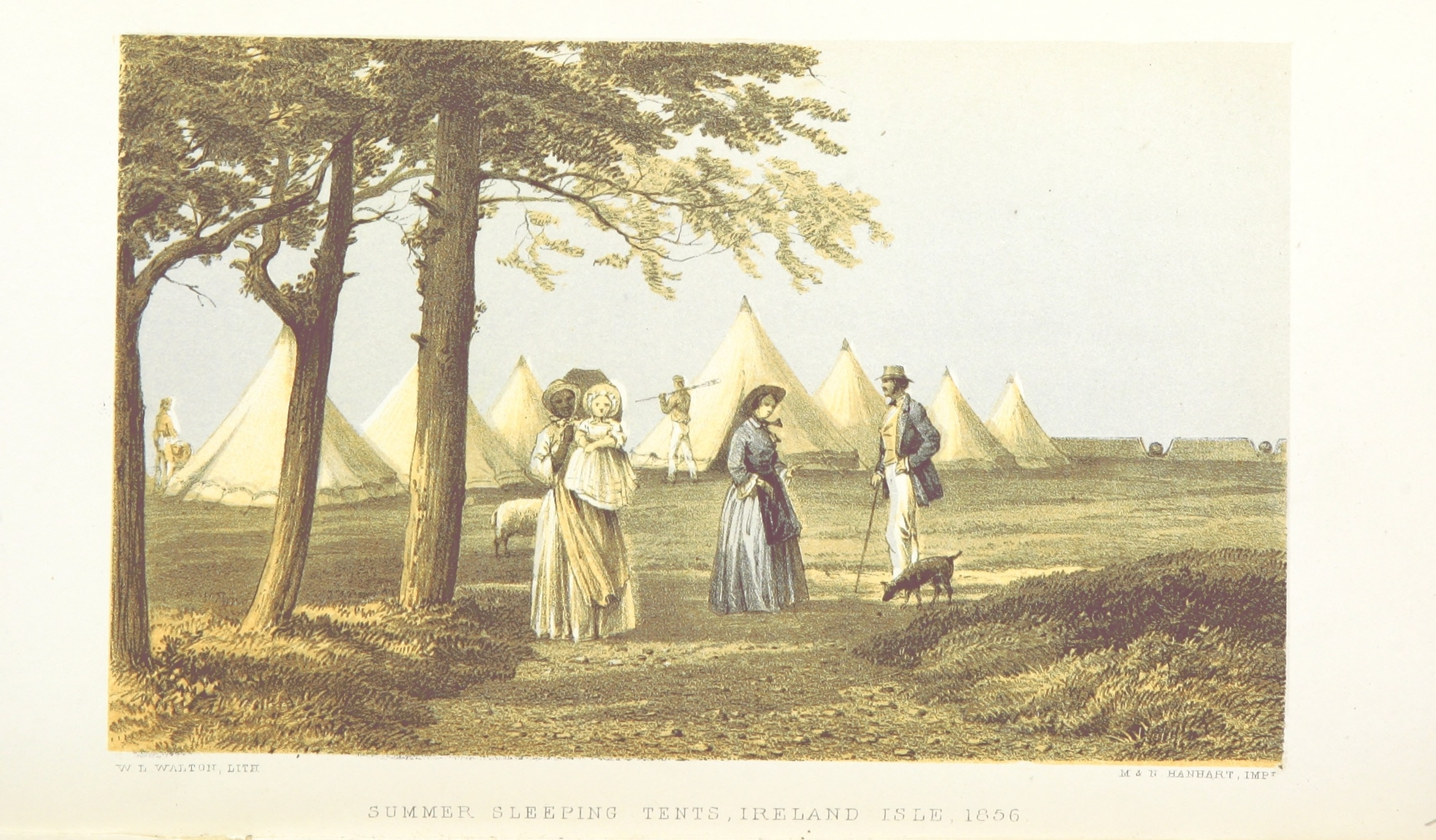
Summer sleeping tents in 1856 (a measure to protect defending soldiers and marines from the occasional Yellow fever epidemics that struck the colony during the 19th Century)

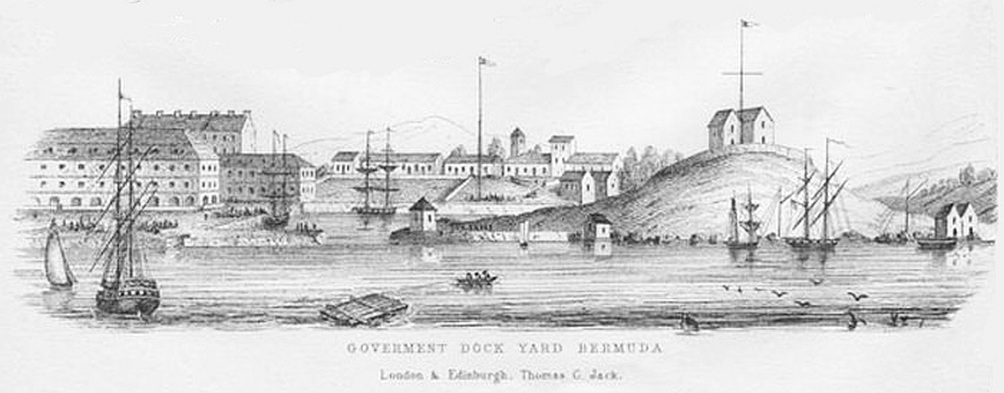
HM Dockyard on Ireland in Bermuda ca, 1860.

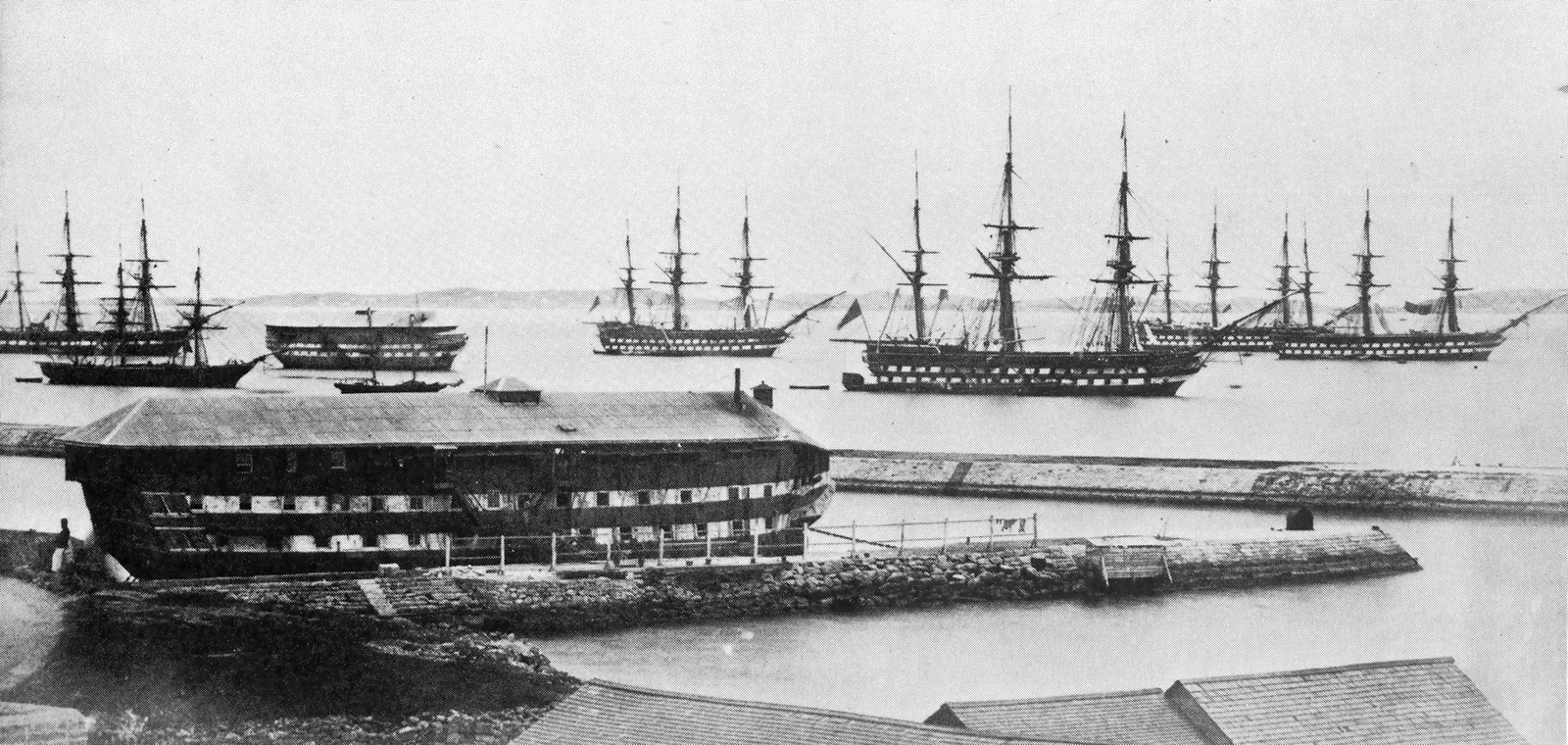
The Grassy Bay anchorage seen from HMD Bermuda in 1865

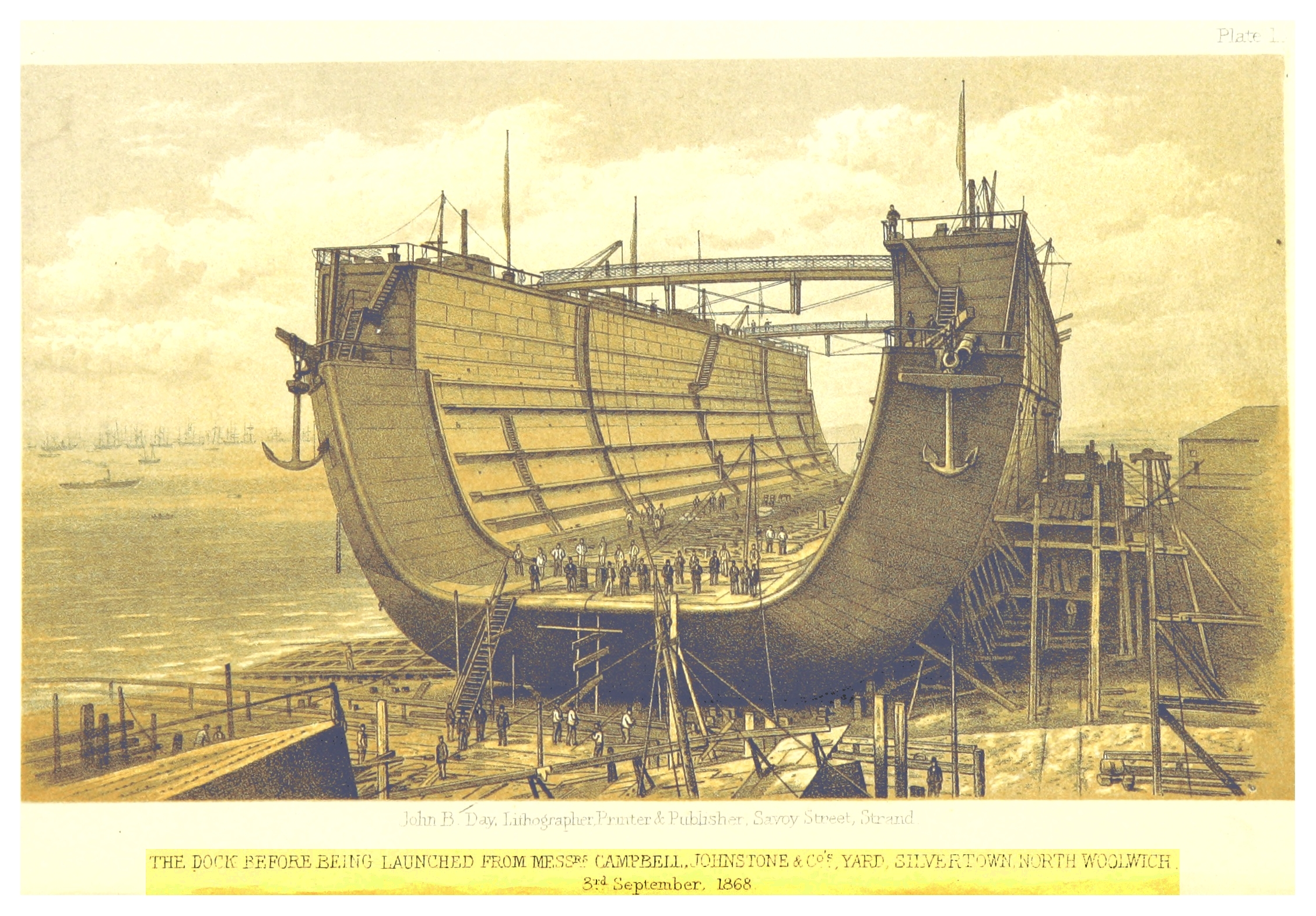
Floating dock Bermuda under construction in England, before being towed to Bermuda in 1869

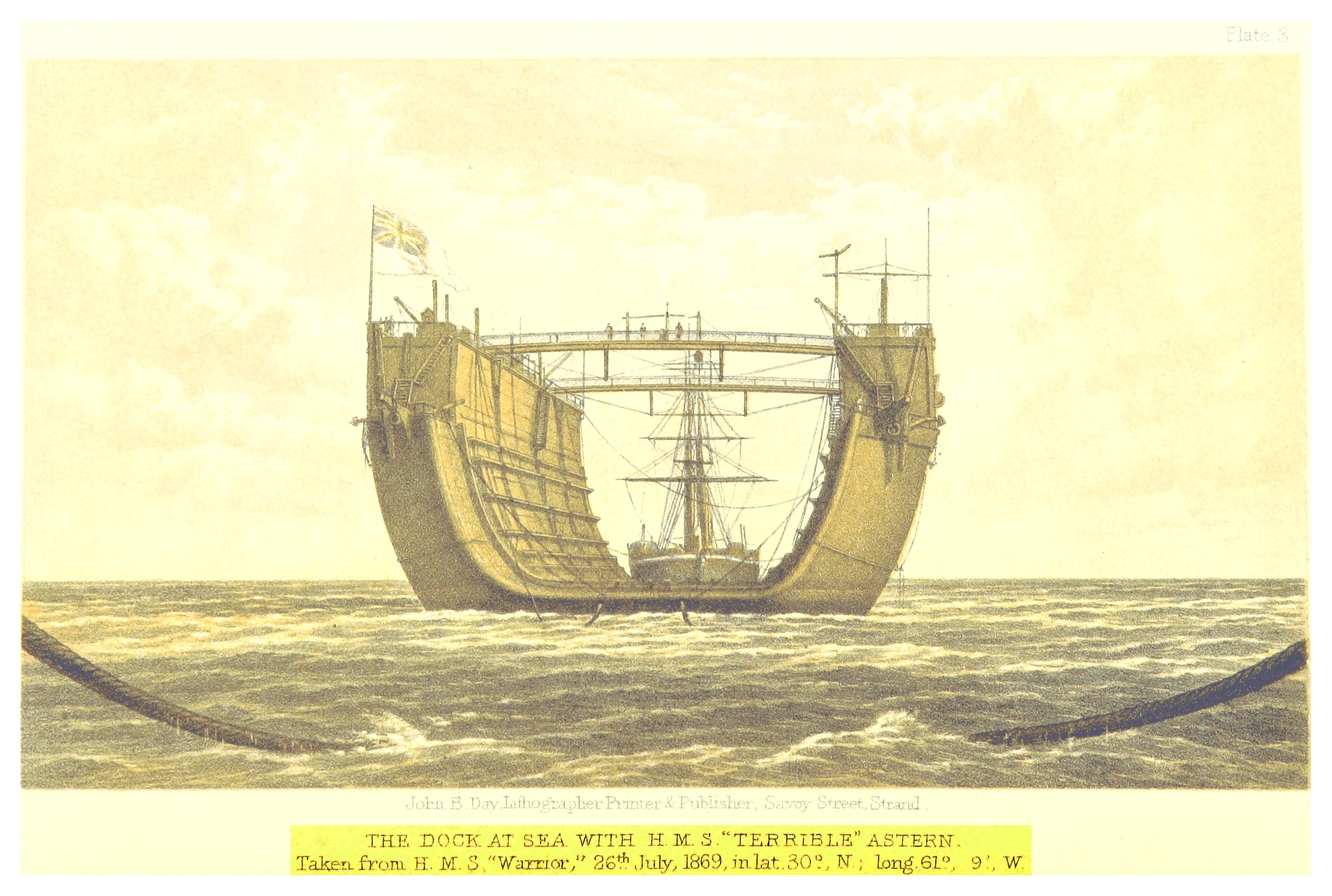
Floating Dock Bermuda at sea under tow to Bermuda, with HMS Terrible astern, taken from HMS Warrior, 26 July 1869

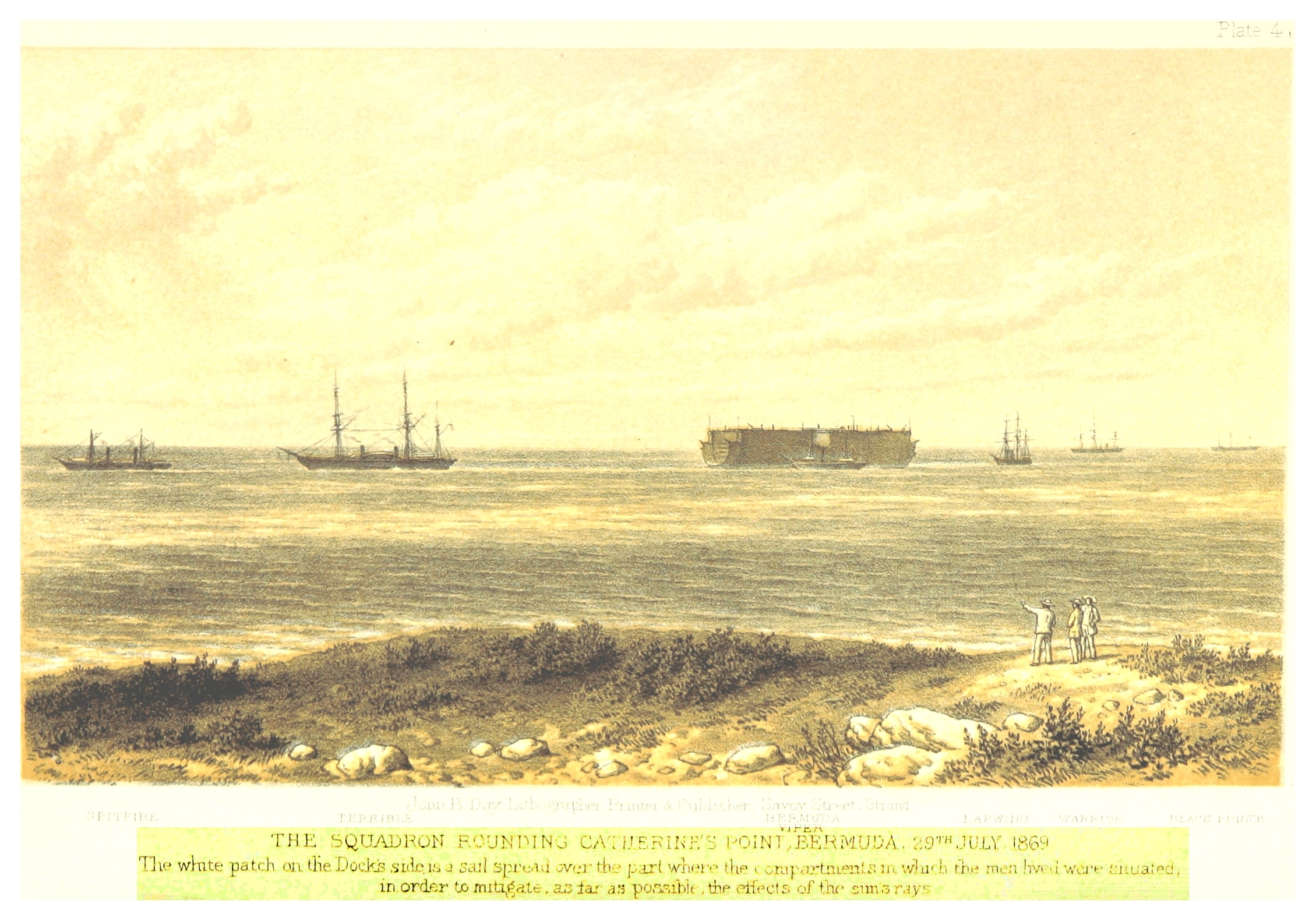
The floating dry dock Bermuda arriving at Bermuda in July, 1869

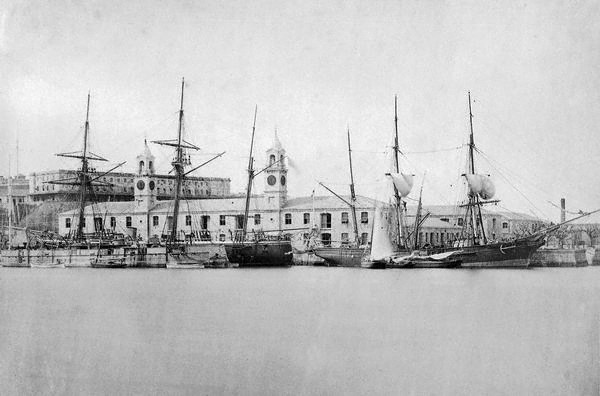
HMS Vixen (left) and the barque Nightwatch (right) at the Royal Navy Dockyard between 1867 and 1873

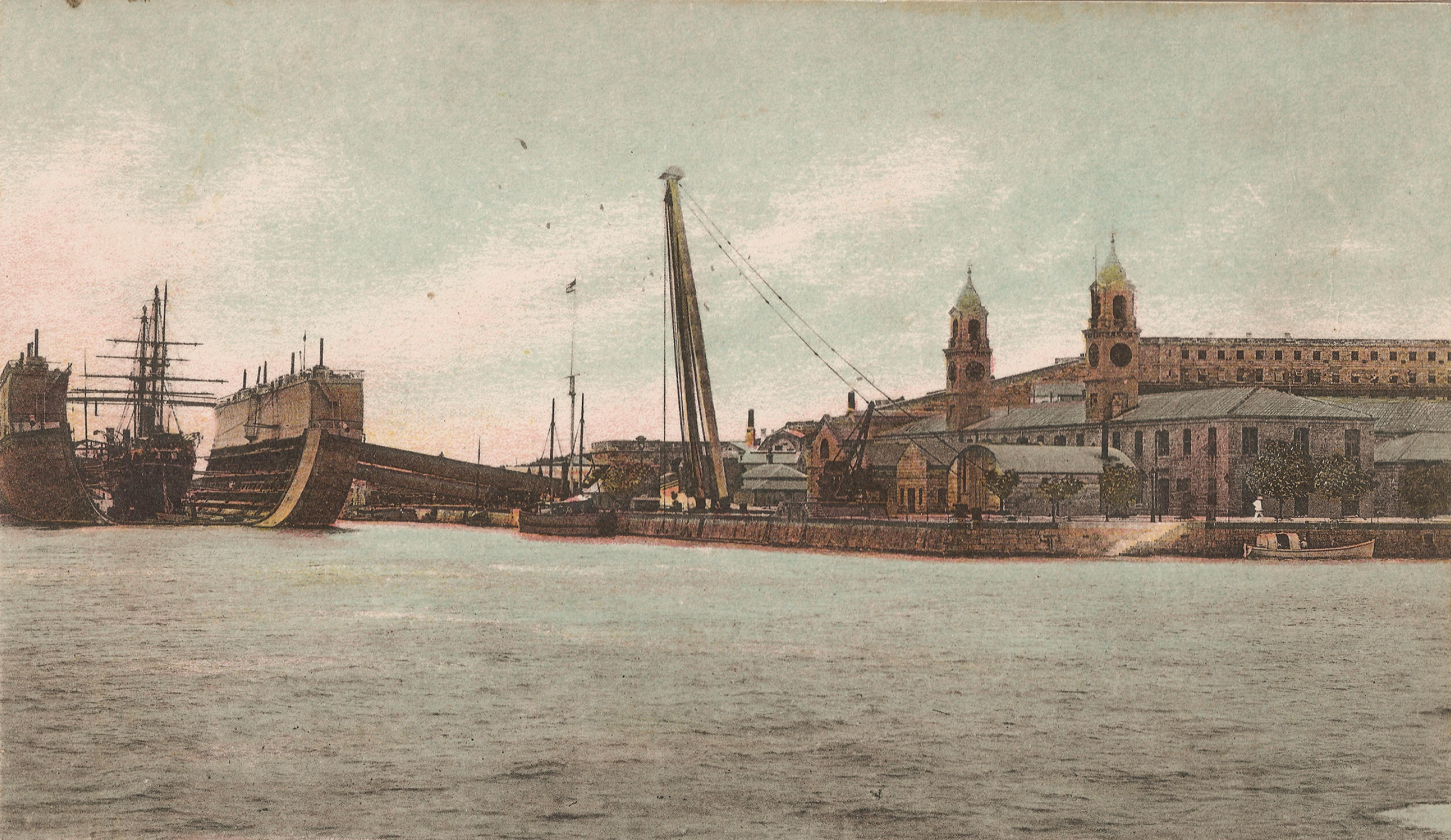
The floating dry dock Bermuda at HM Dockyard Bermuda

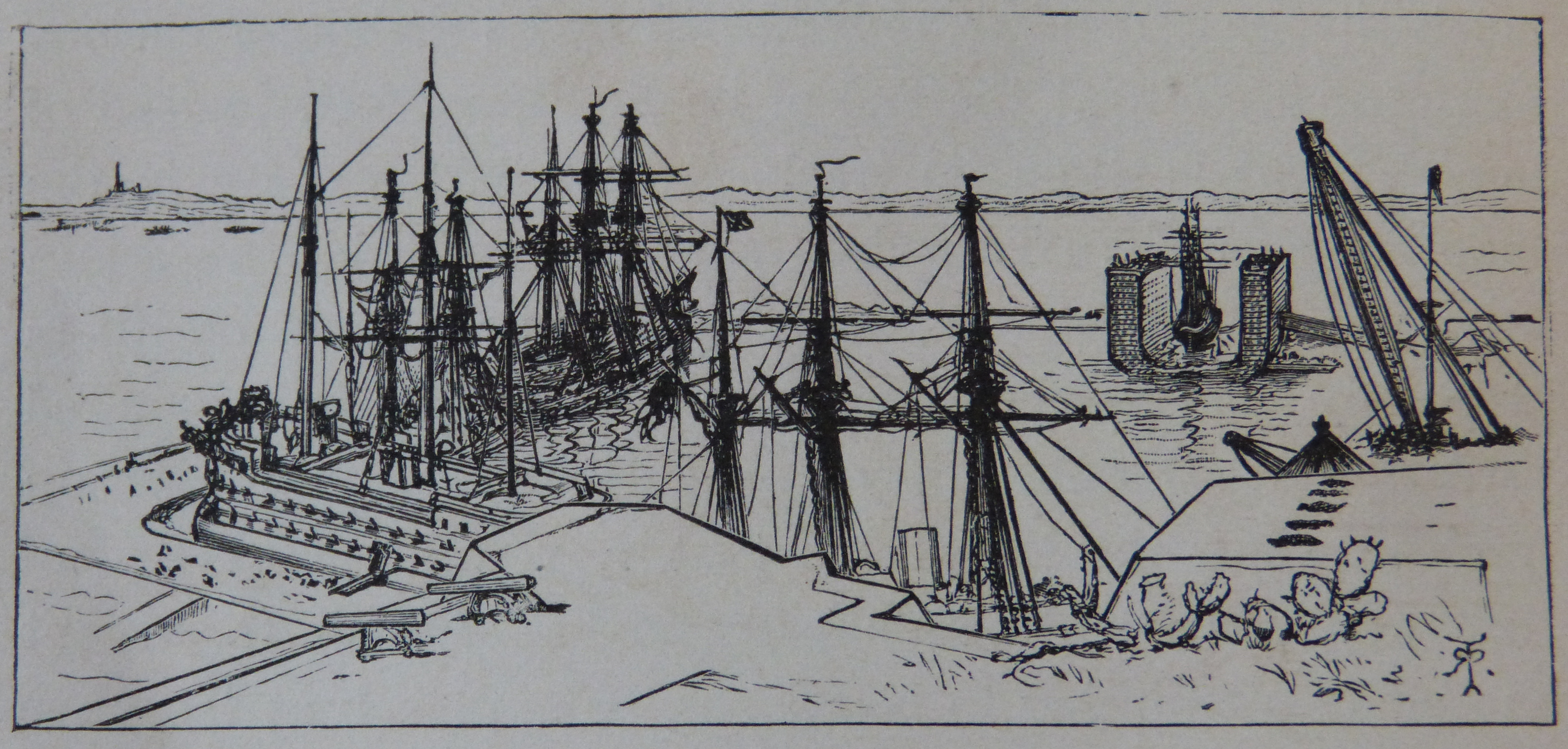
HM Dockyard as seen from the Keep by Ana Brassey in 1883, with two warships and the floating drydock

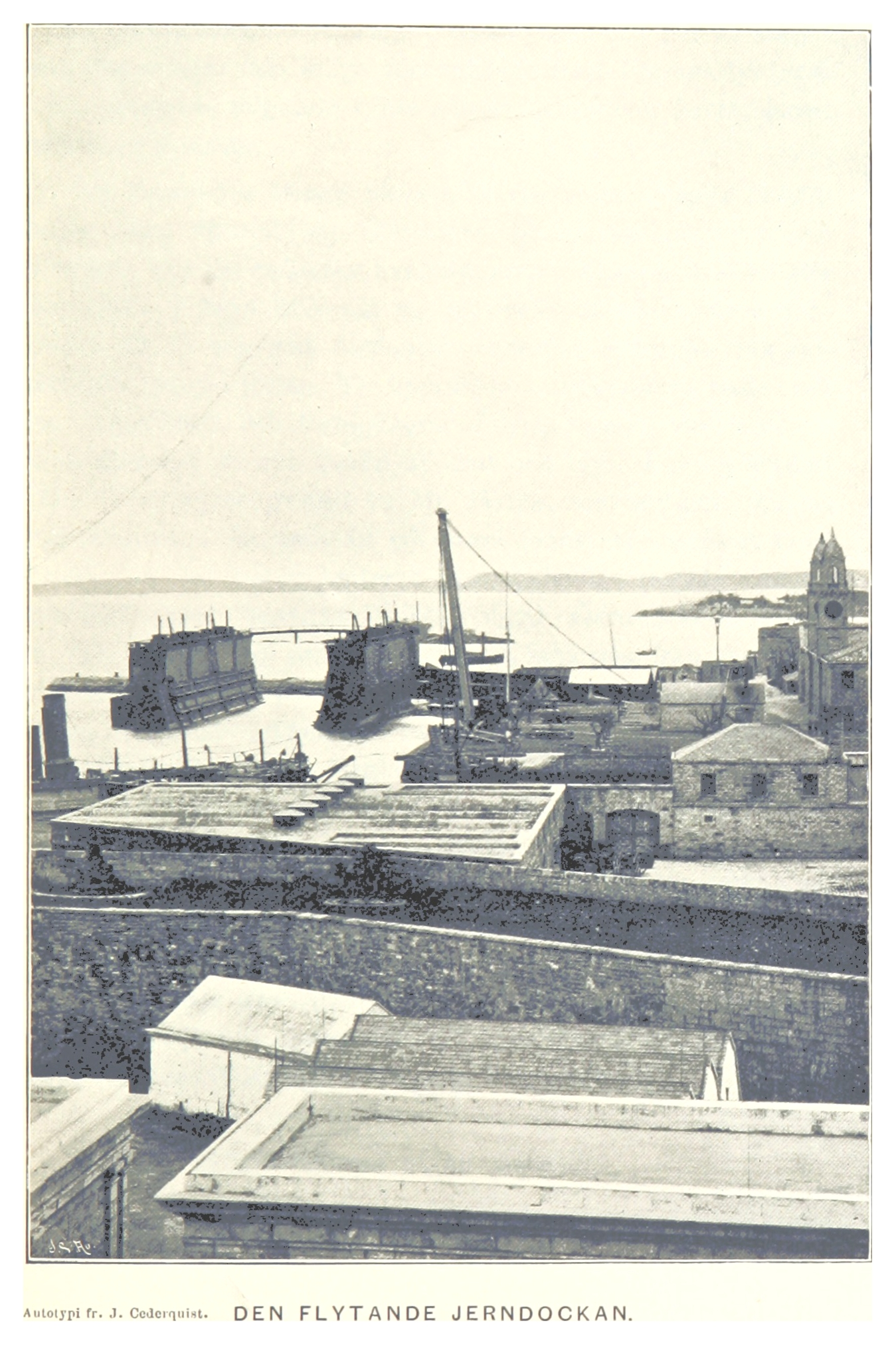
floating drydock in Bermuda, 1895

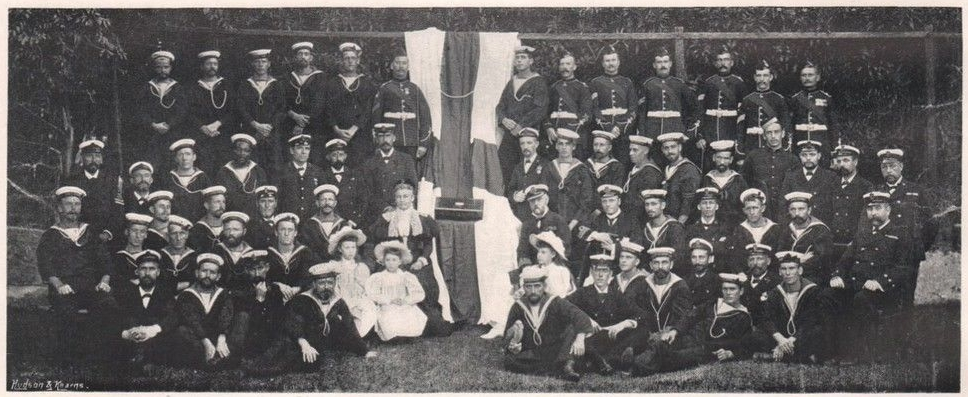
First Flag presented to Captain-in-Charge John William Brackenbury, CB, CMG, on 31 October 1896, following his promotion to Rear Admiral

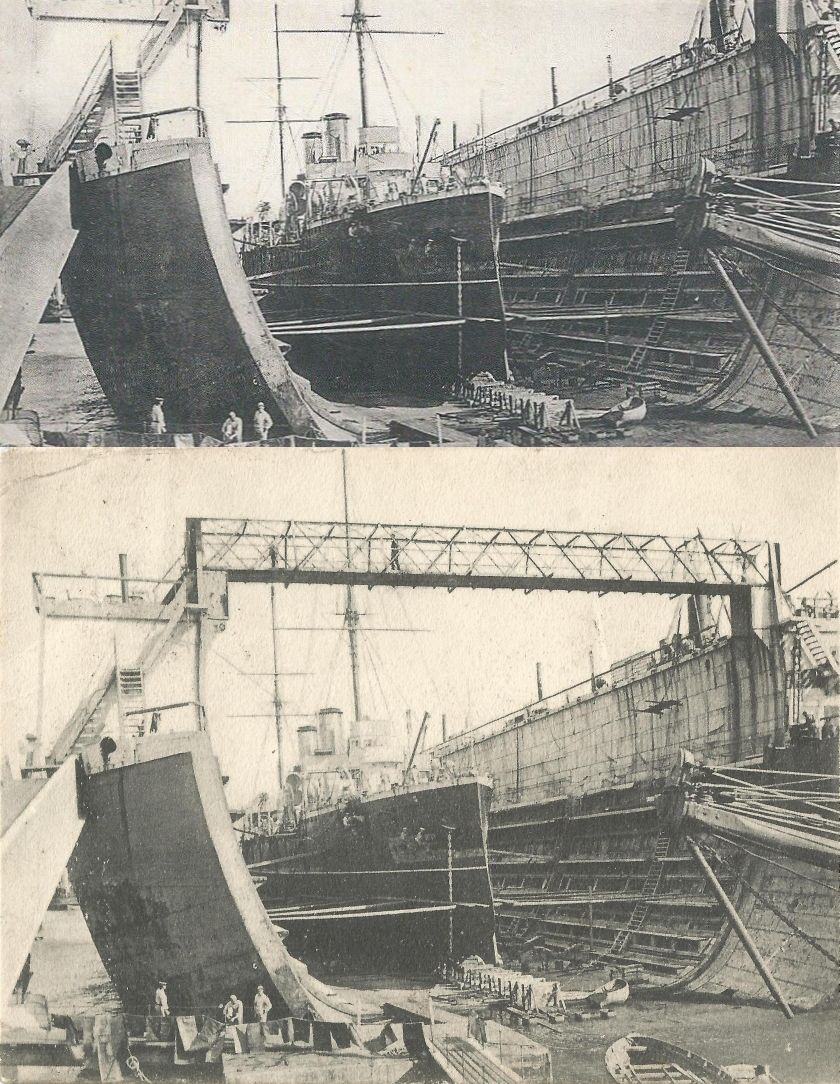
HMS Psyche in the floating drydock, circa 1899-1902.

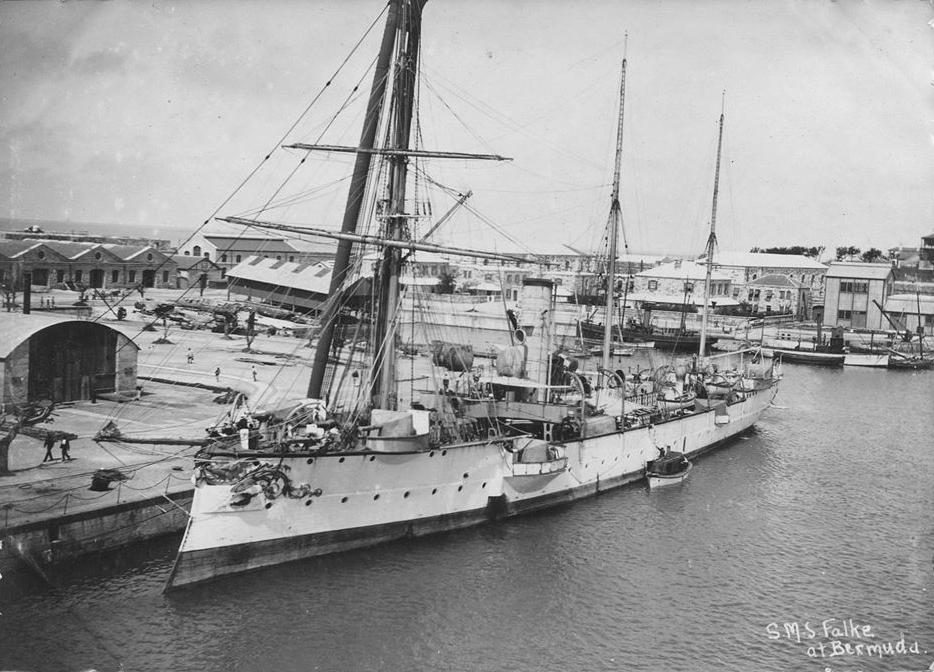
SMS Falke at the Royal Naval Dockyard in 1903

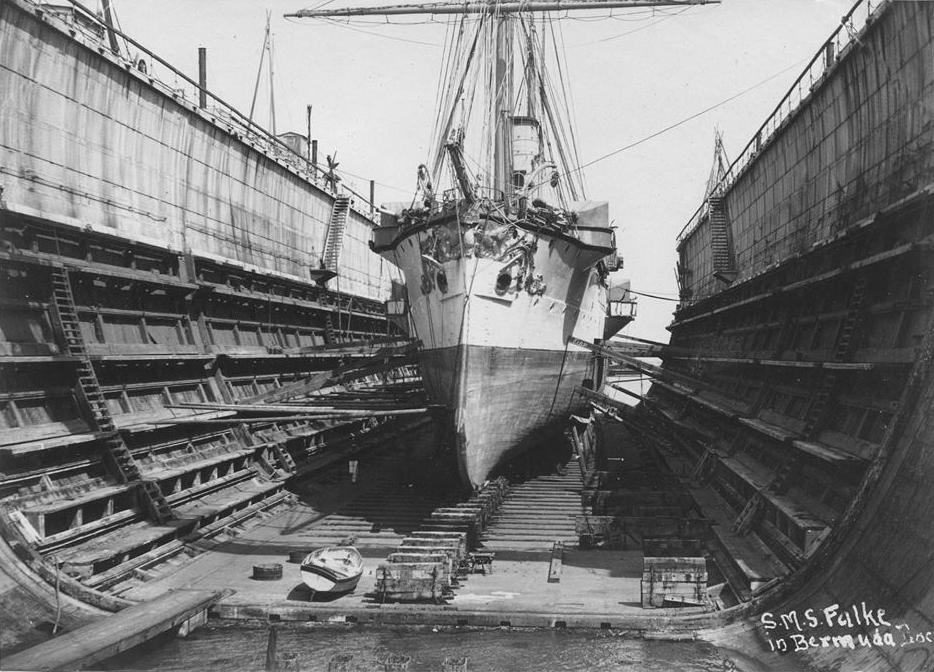
SMS Falke in the floating drydock Bermuda in 1903

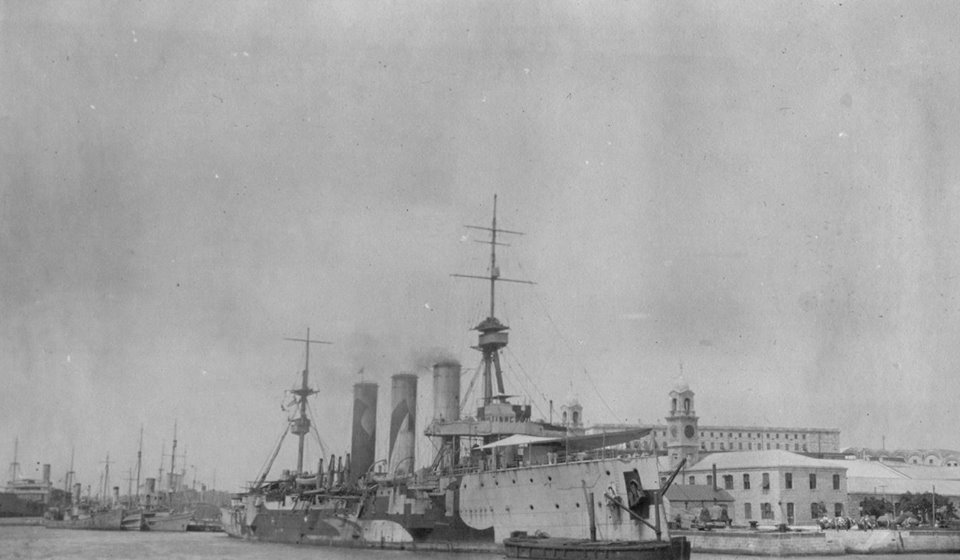
HMS Donegal at HM Dockyard Bermuda circa 1918

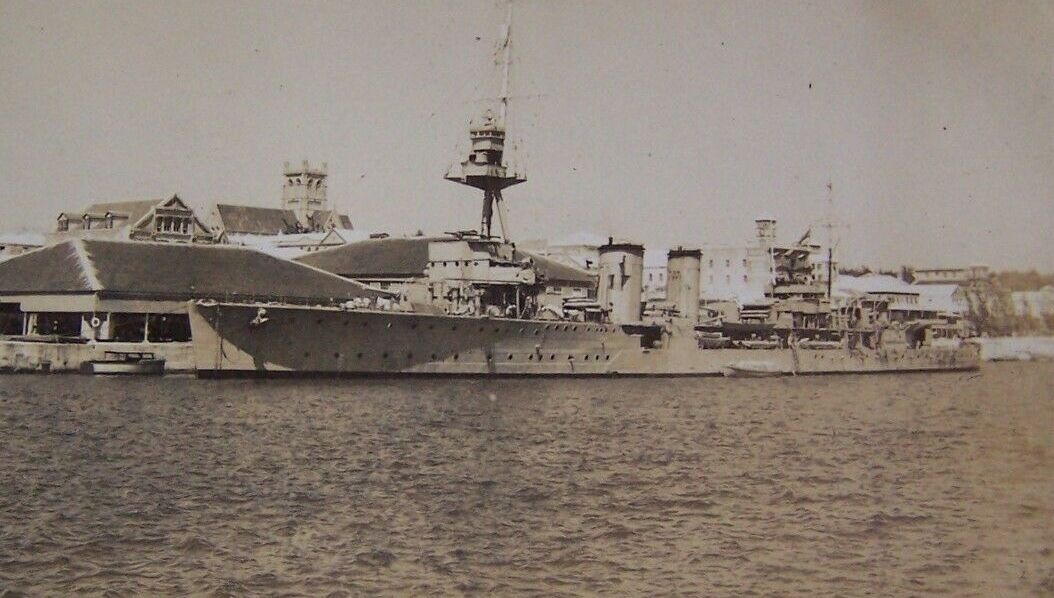
HMS Caradoc (D60) at the City of Hamilton circa 1928

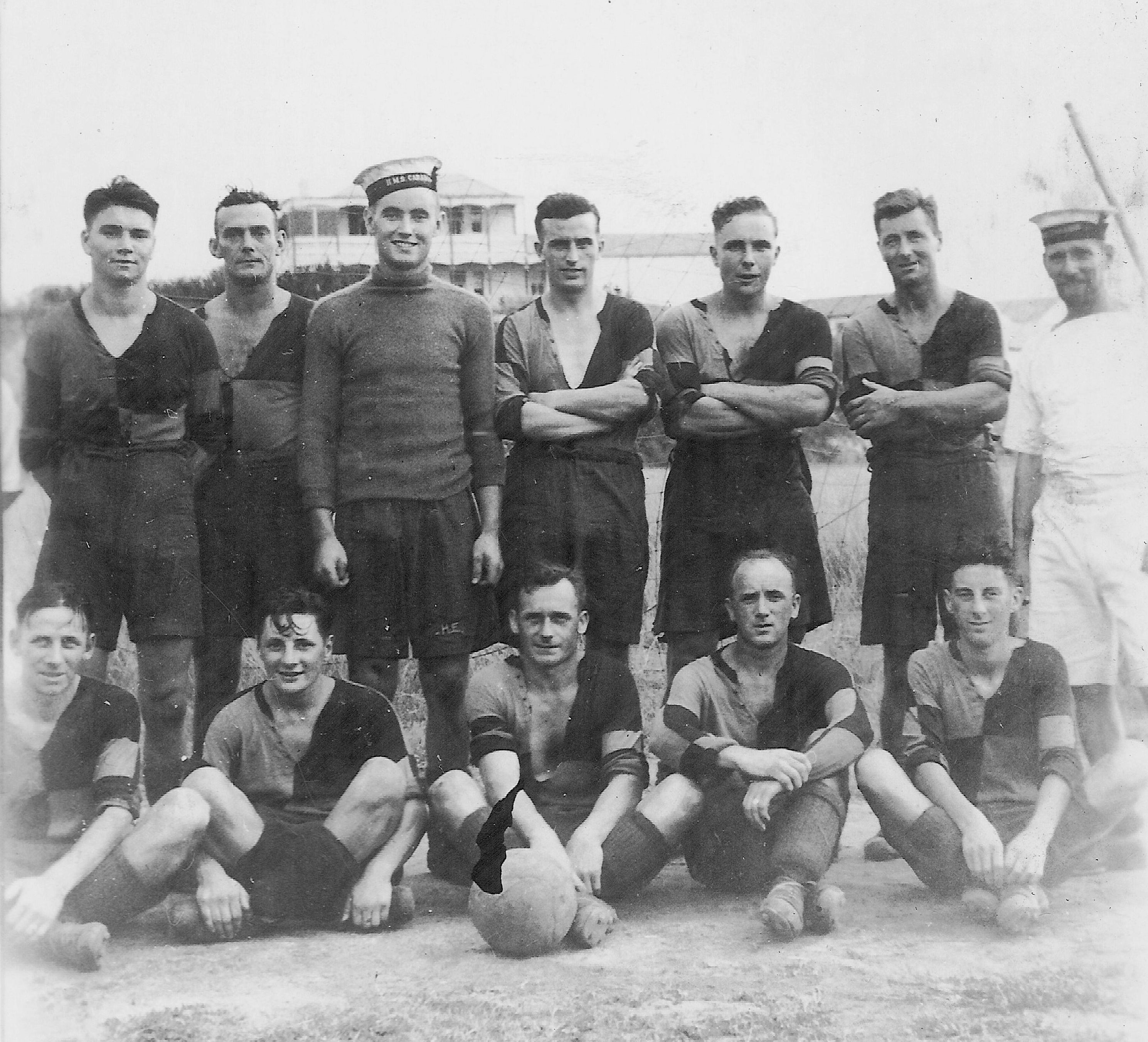
HMS Caradoc football team on Moresby Plain (with Moresby House behind)

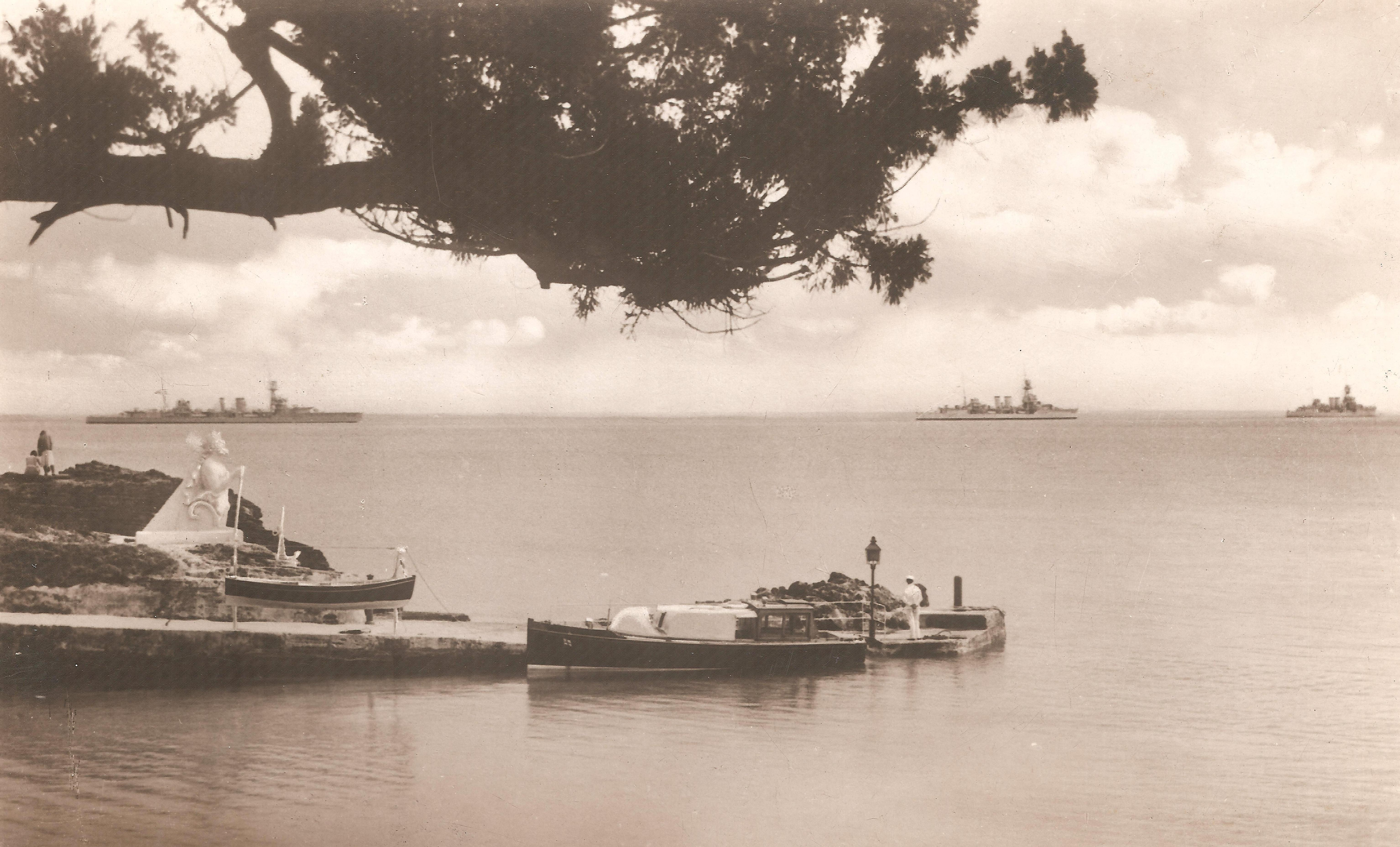
America and West Indies Station 1st Division (HMS Dragon, HMS Danae and HMS Despatch) off Admiralty House in 1931 as they depart the Royal Naval Dockyard to exercise on the open ocean

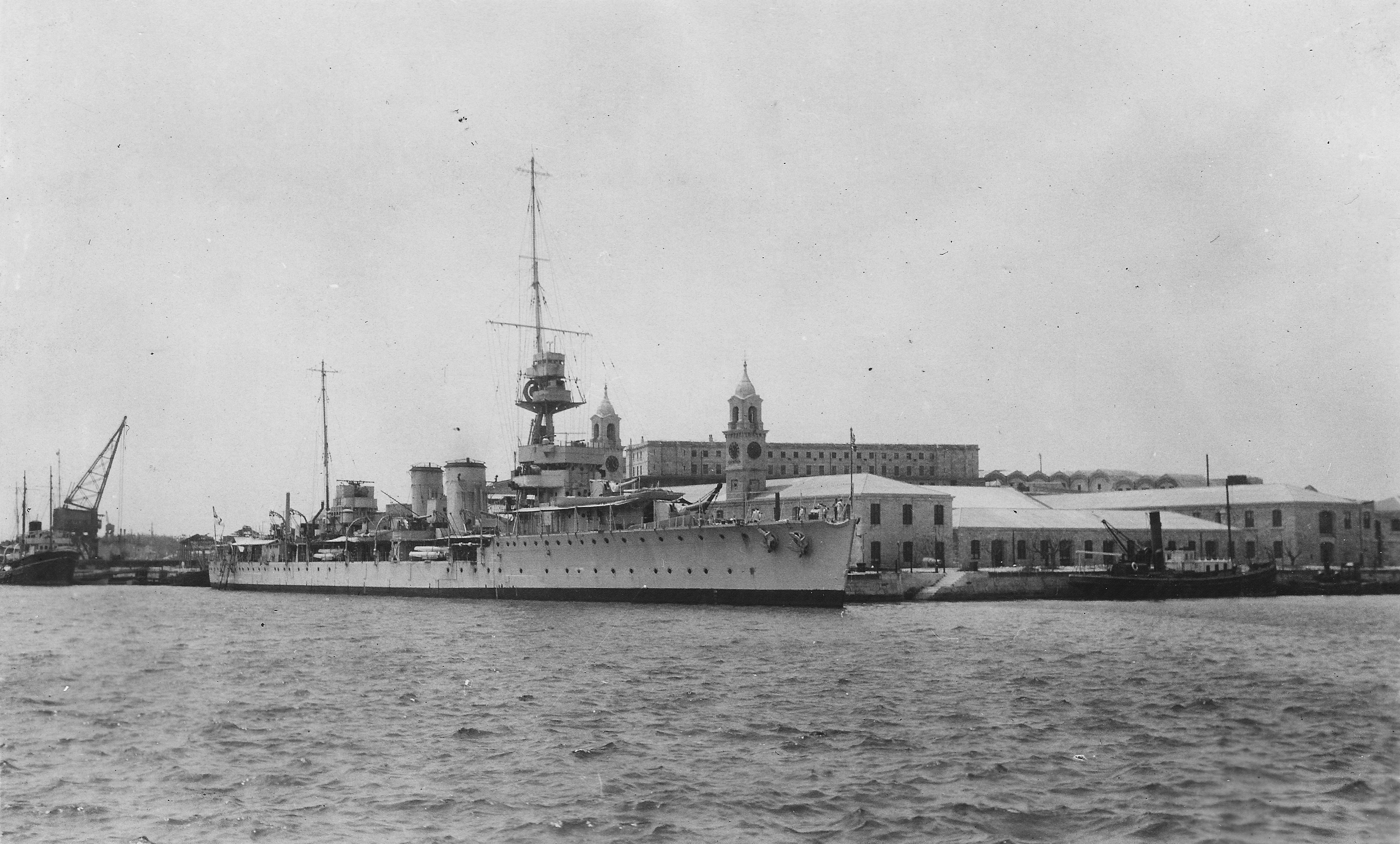
HMS Dauntless (D45) at the Royal Naval Dockyard in Bermuda in the 1930s

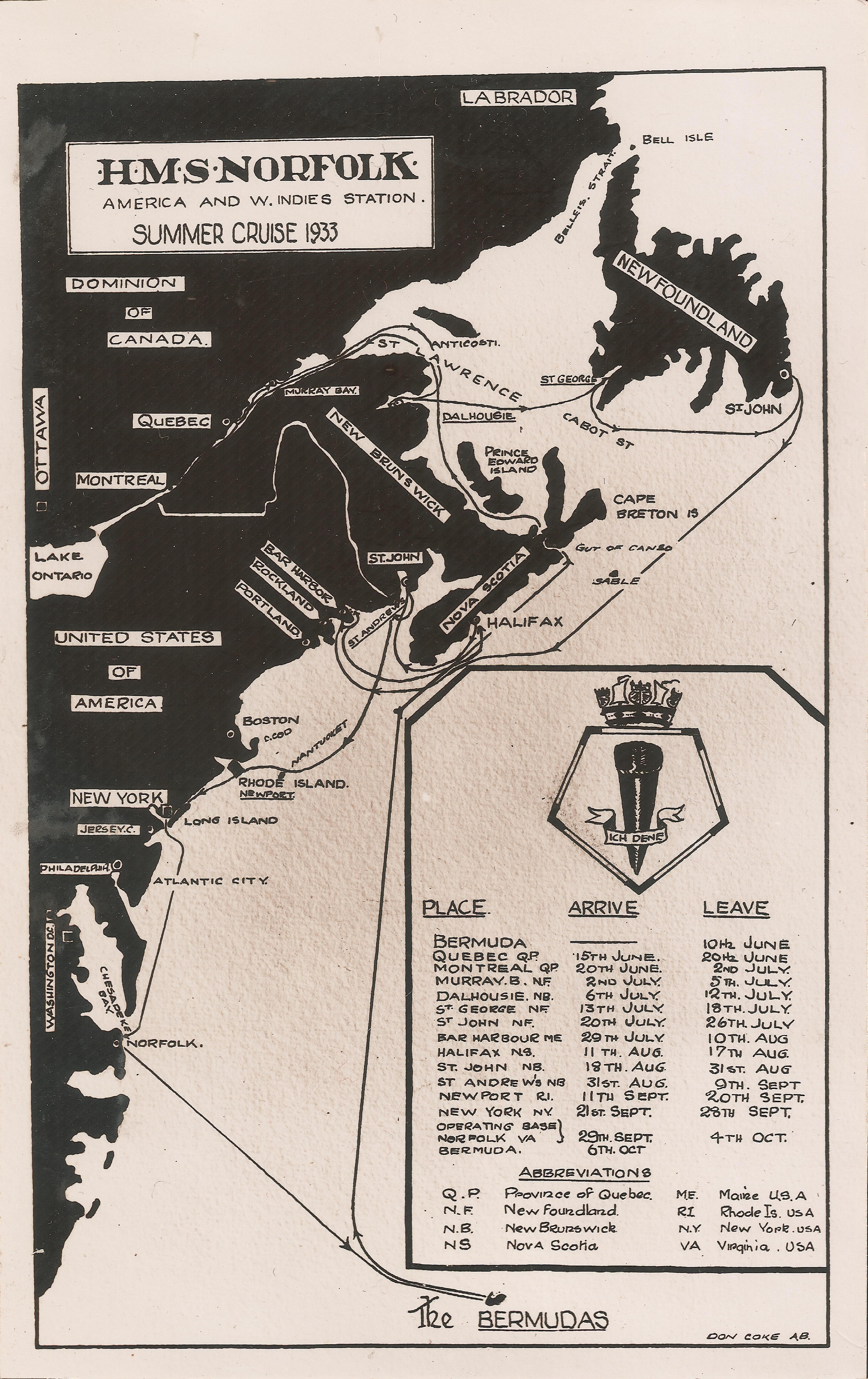
1933 HMS Norfolk summer cruise map

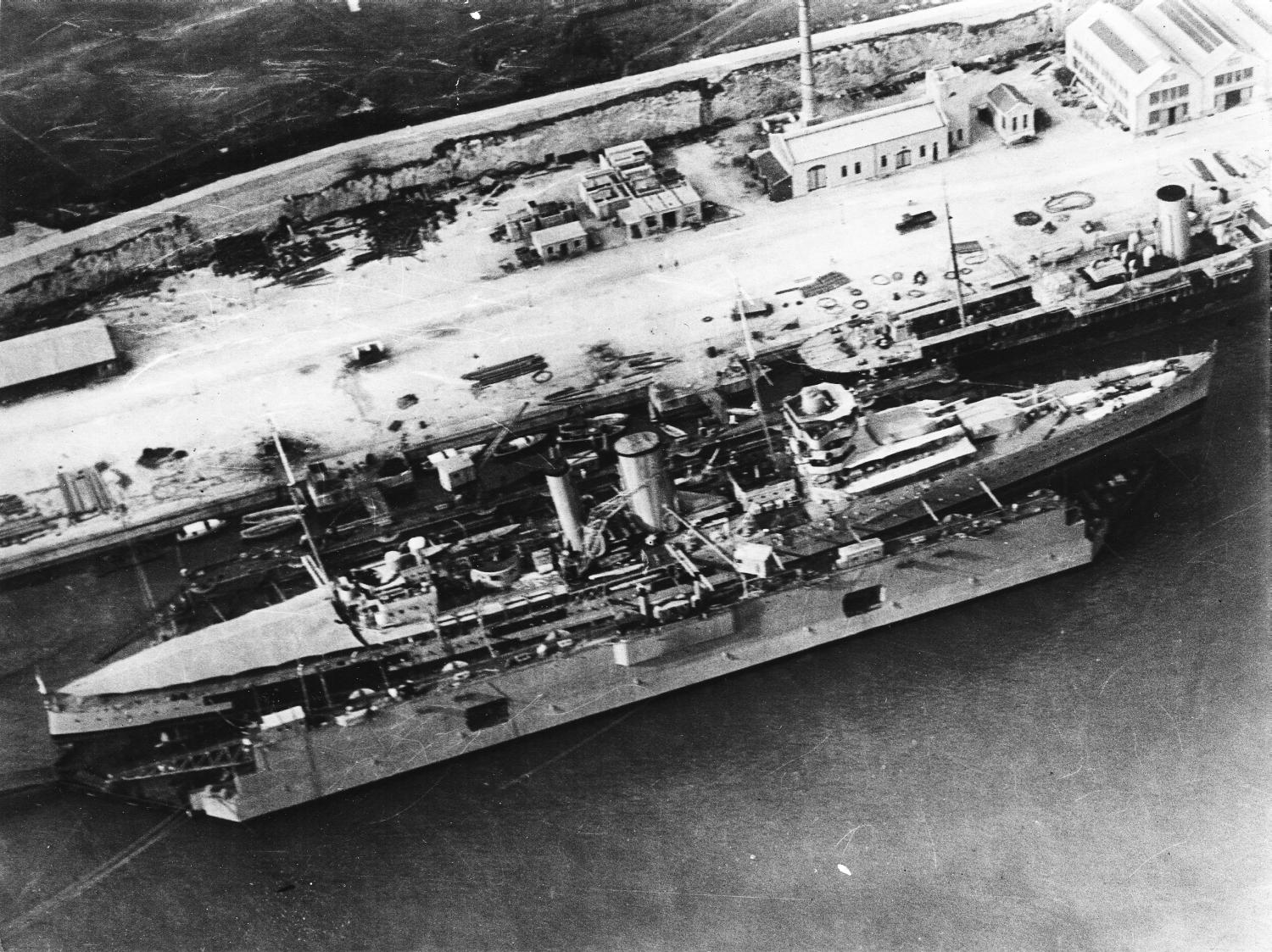
HMS York in Admiralty Floating Dock No. 1 in 1934

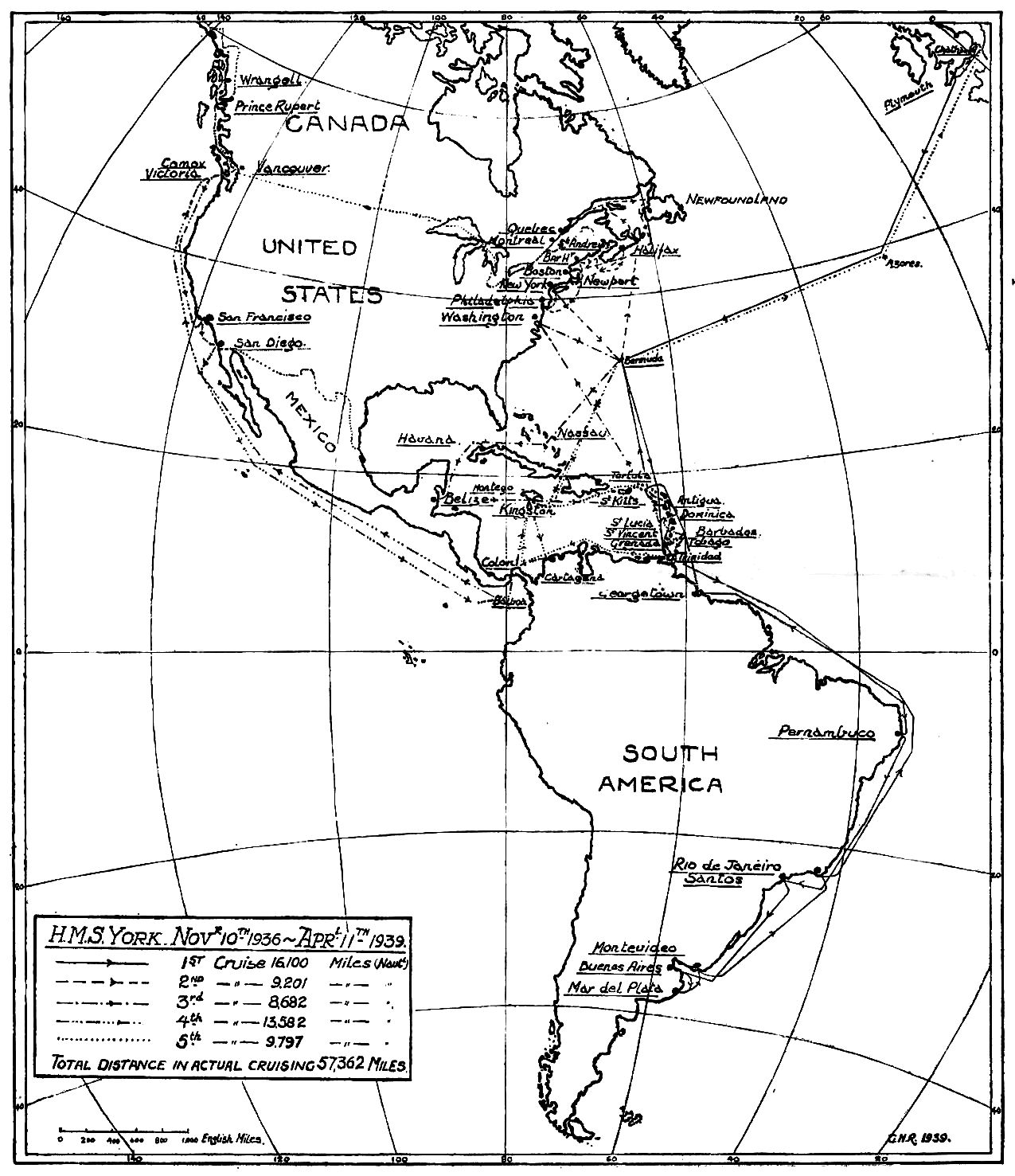
Map of the cruises of the Bermuda-based HMS York on the America & West Indies Station, 1936-1939

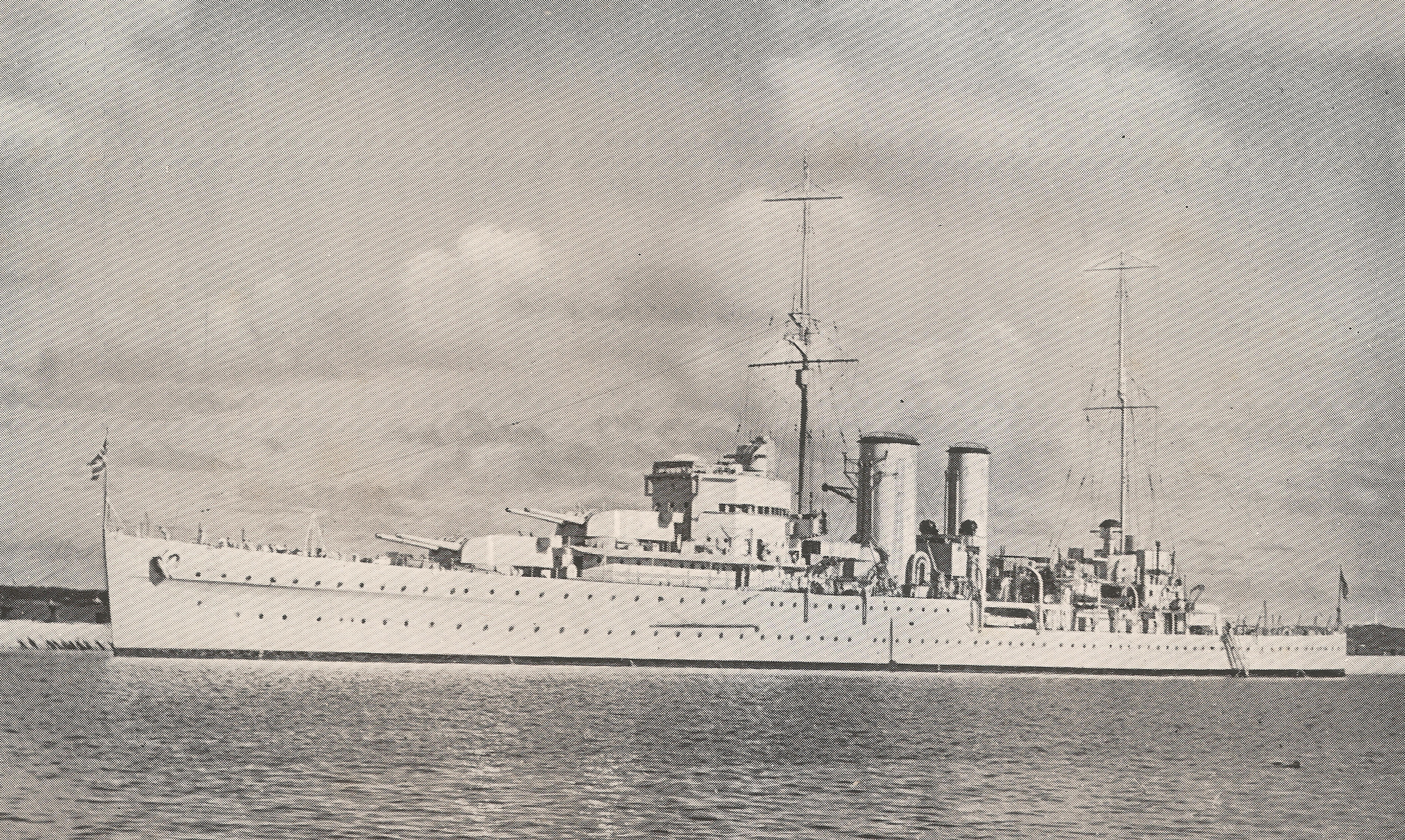
HMS Exeter at the Royal Naval Dockyard with Gibb's Hill Lighthouse beyond, ca 1936

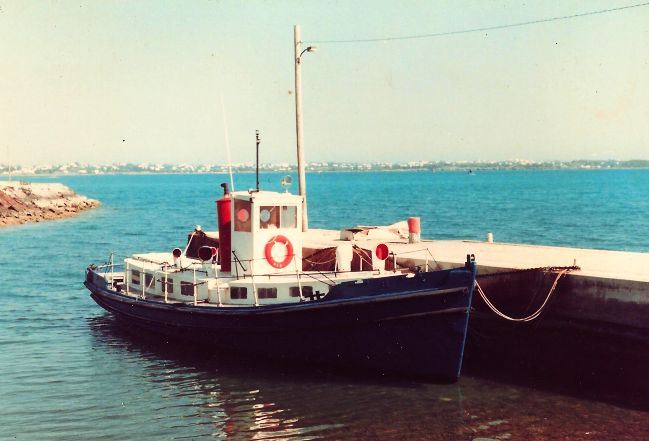
Harbour Launch (Diesel) of HMS Malabar at HMD Bermuda ca 1988

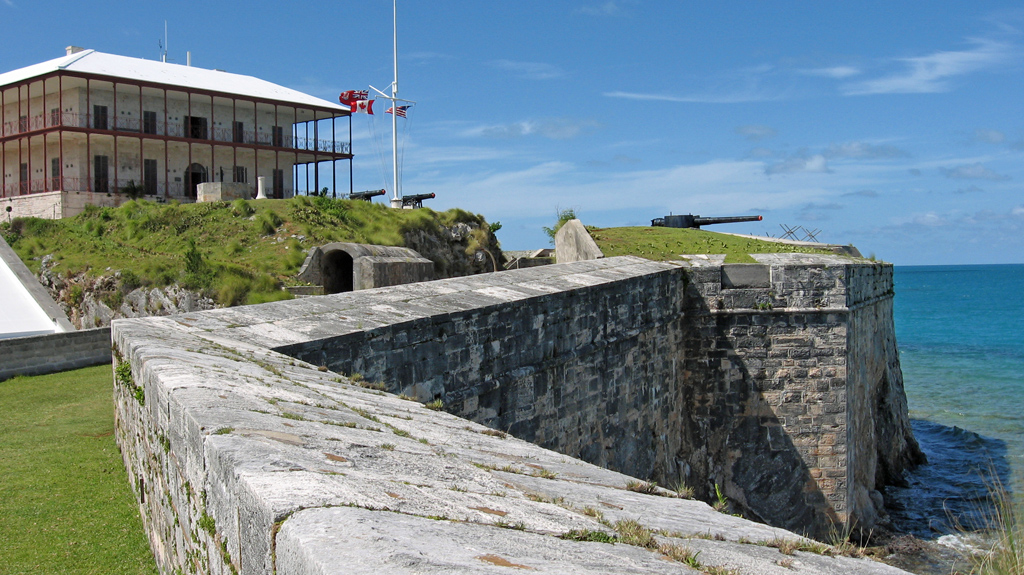
The Commissioner's House and 6-inch RBL gun of the Keep.

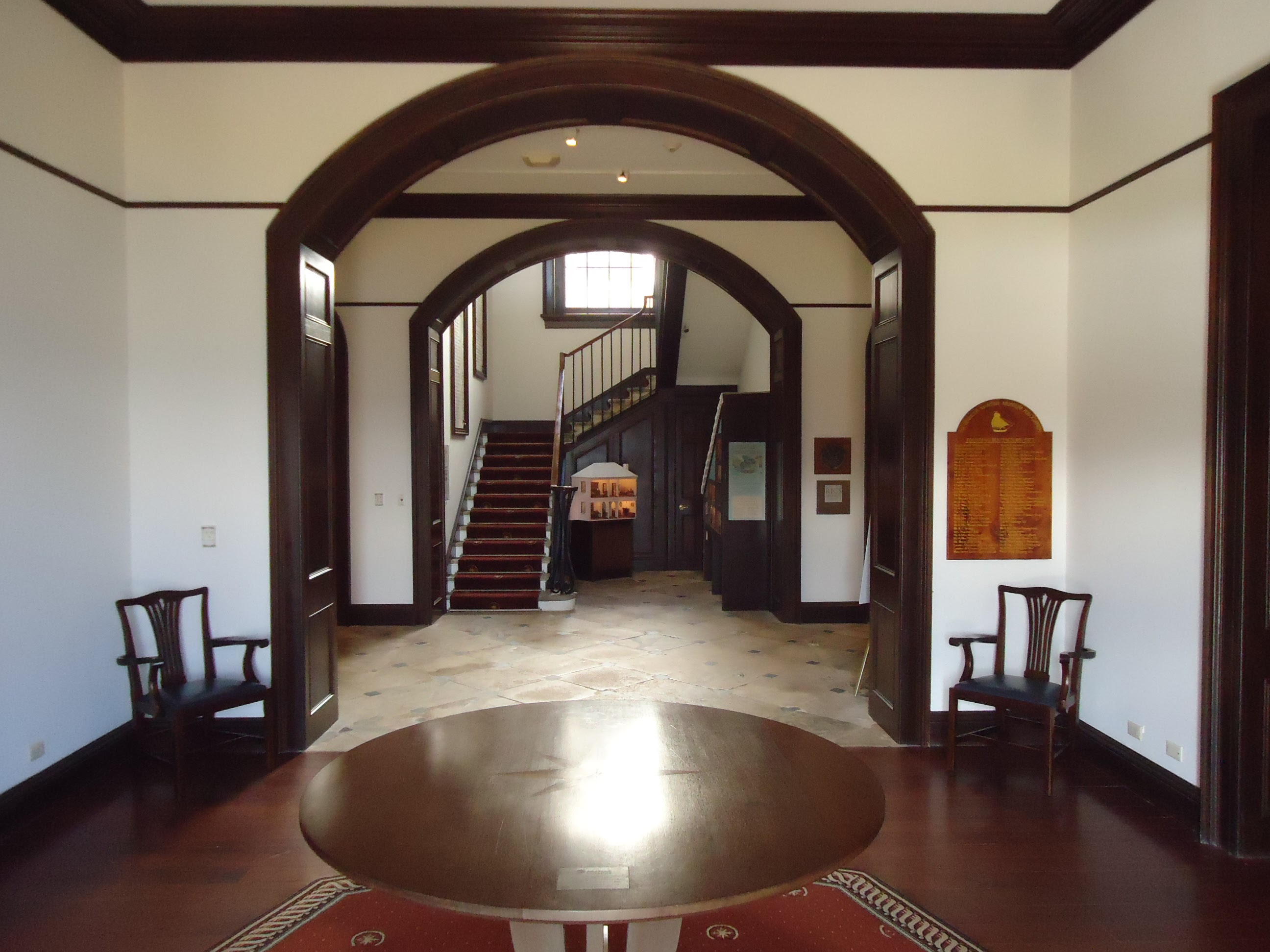
The Commissioner's House (interior).

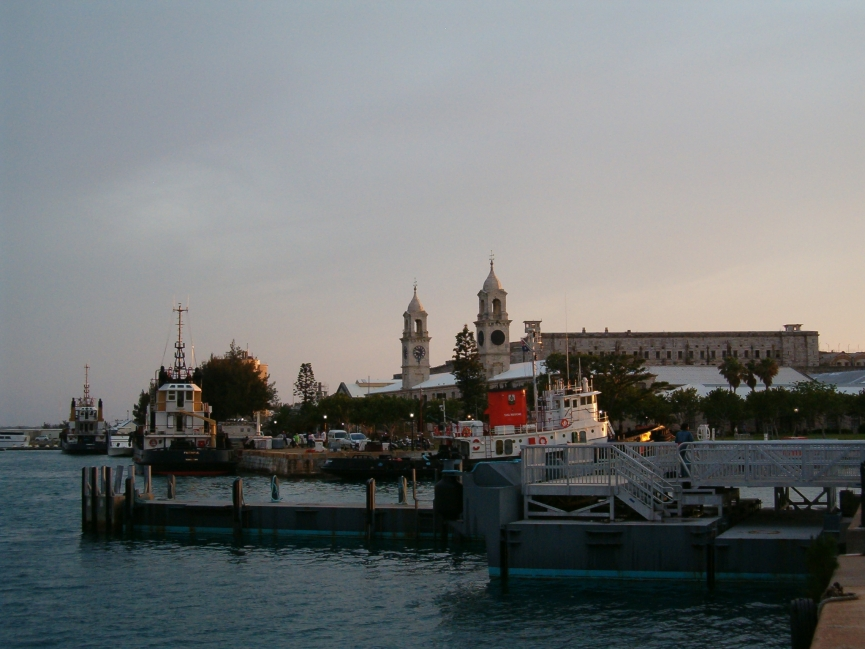
Dockyard and clocktower in 2006

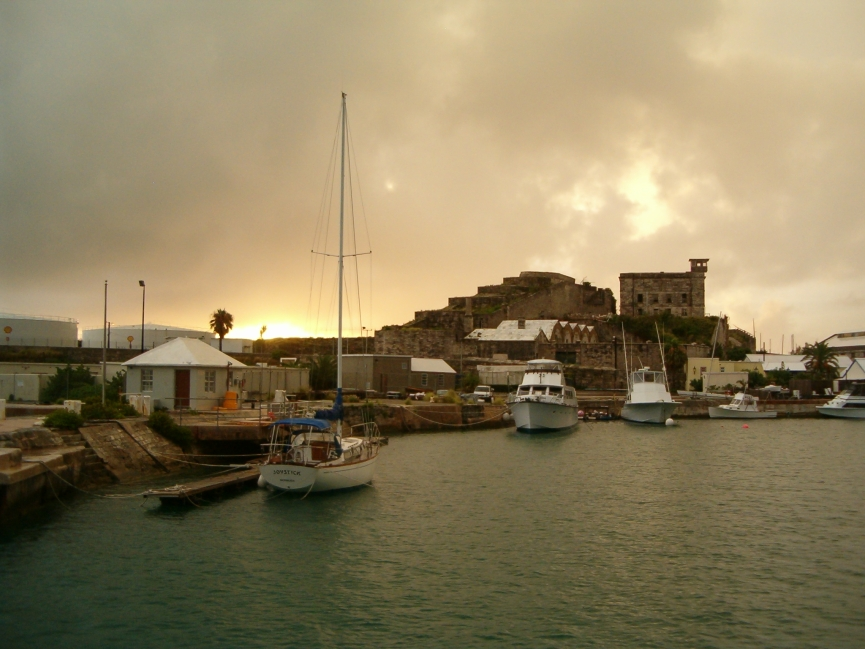
A view of the Casemates barracks, behind the defensive wall from which it derives its name.

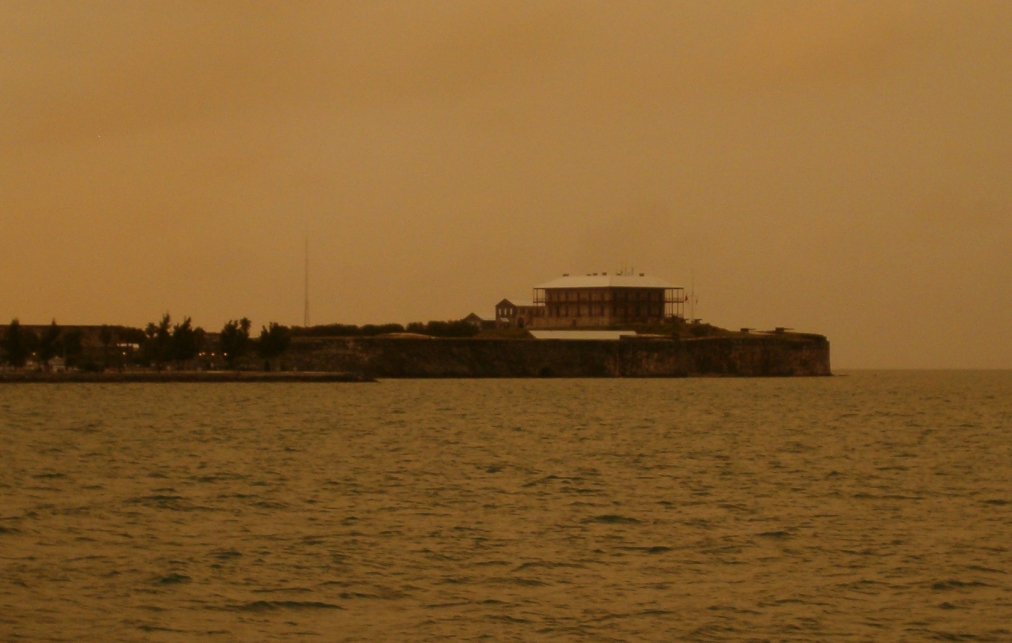
The Keep, as seen from the Great Sound

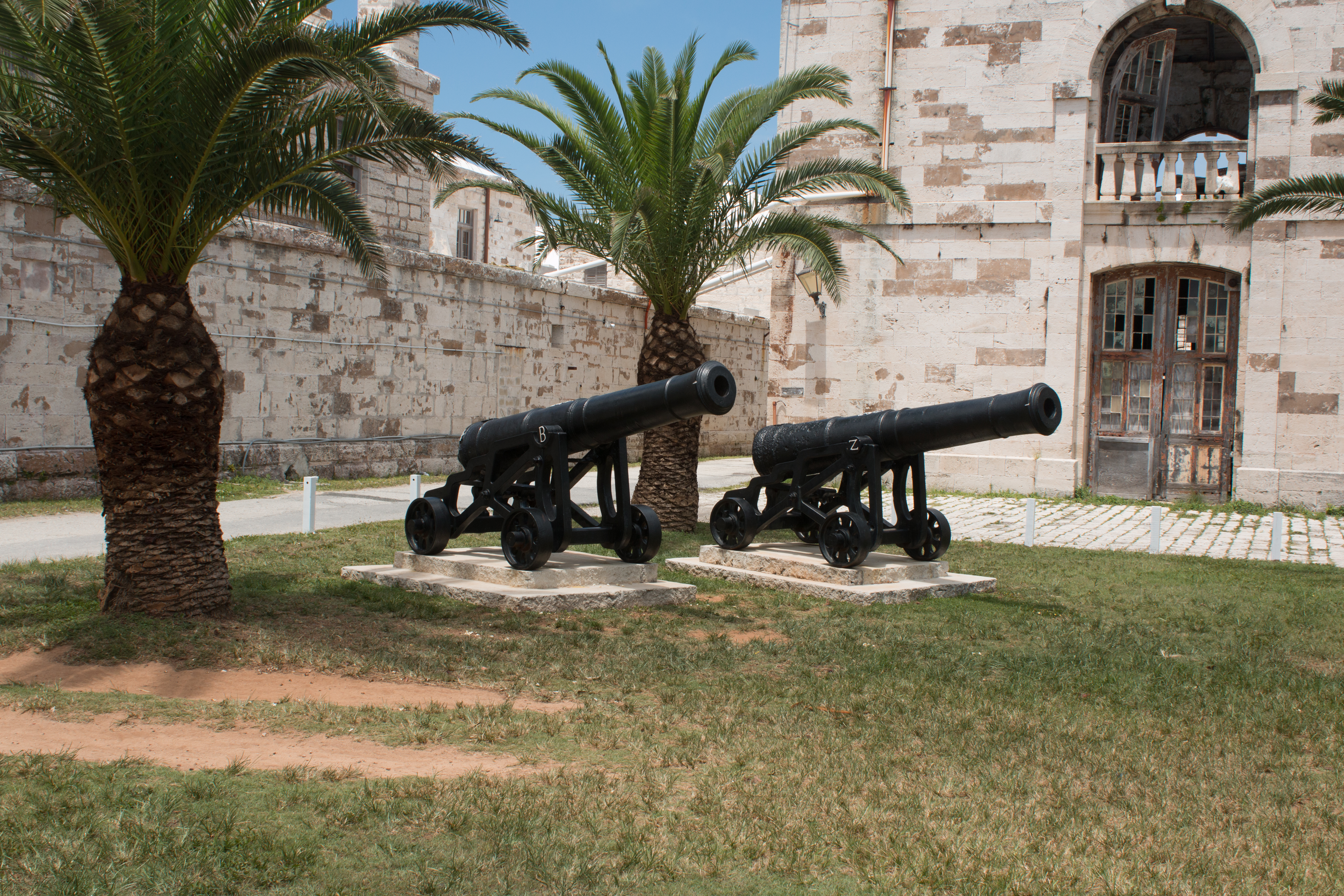
Victualling yard

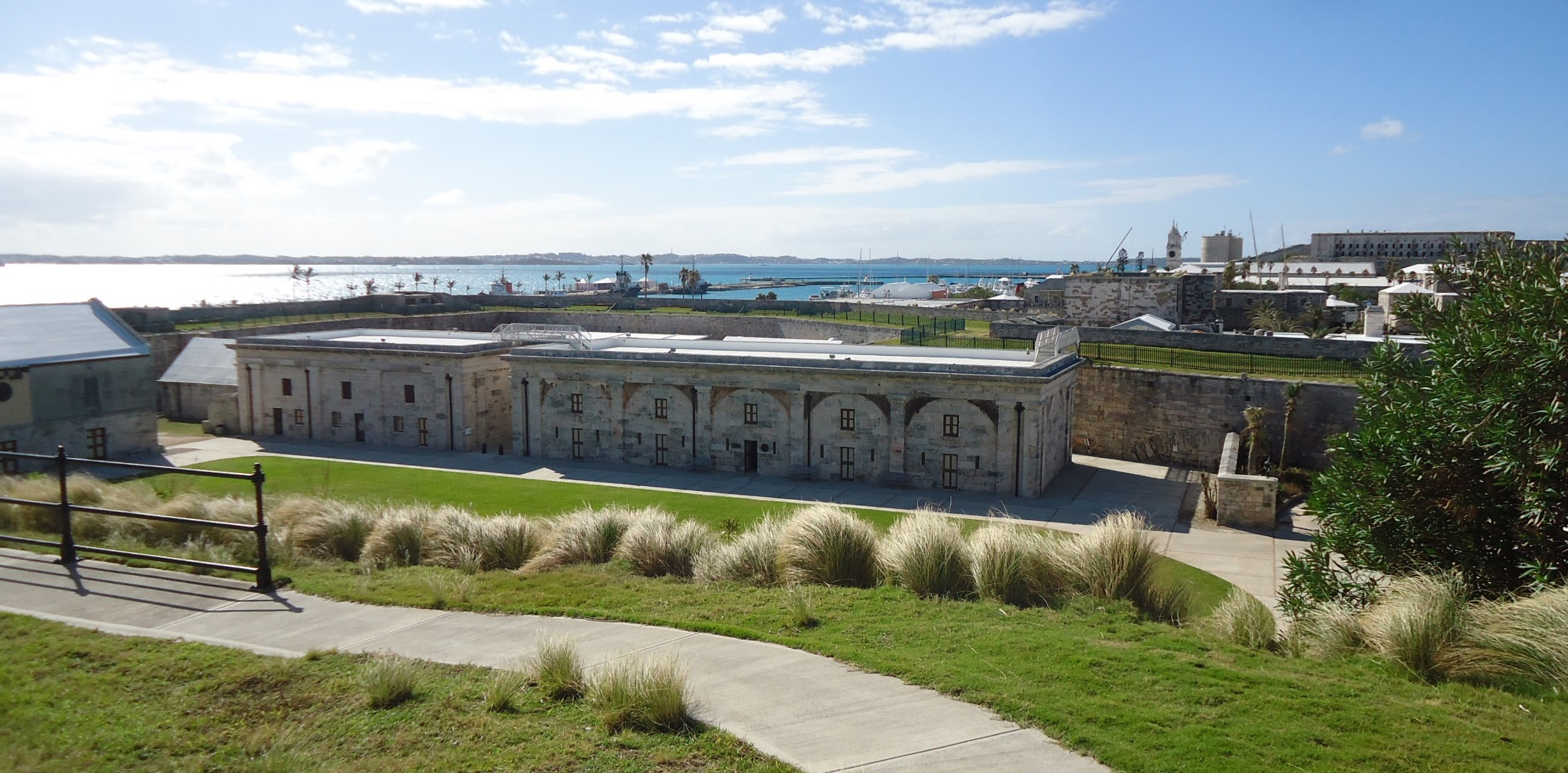
Ordnance yard

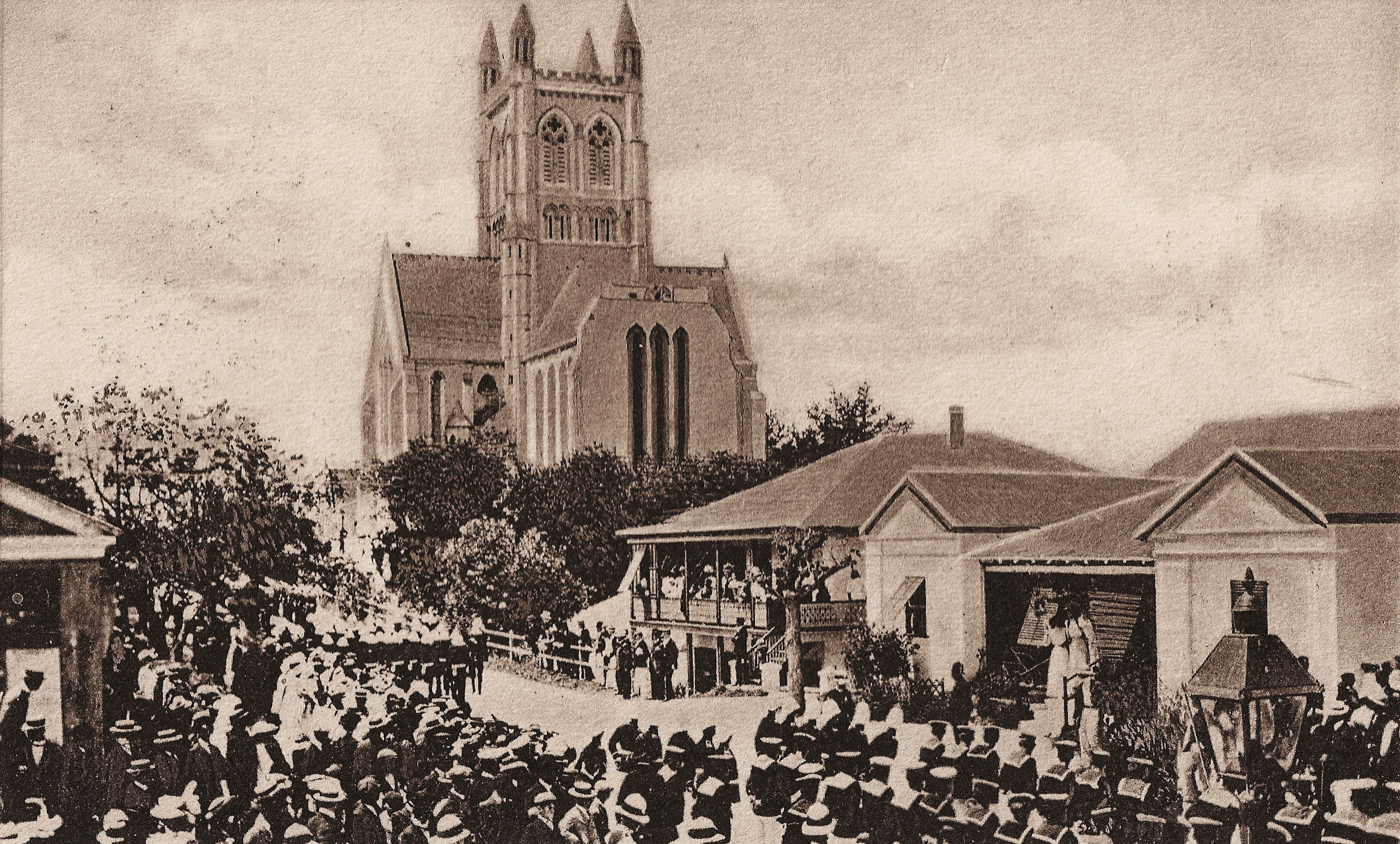
Church Parade of the Royal Navy and British Army at the (then under construction) Cathedral in the City of Hamilton, circa 1900

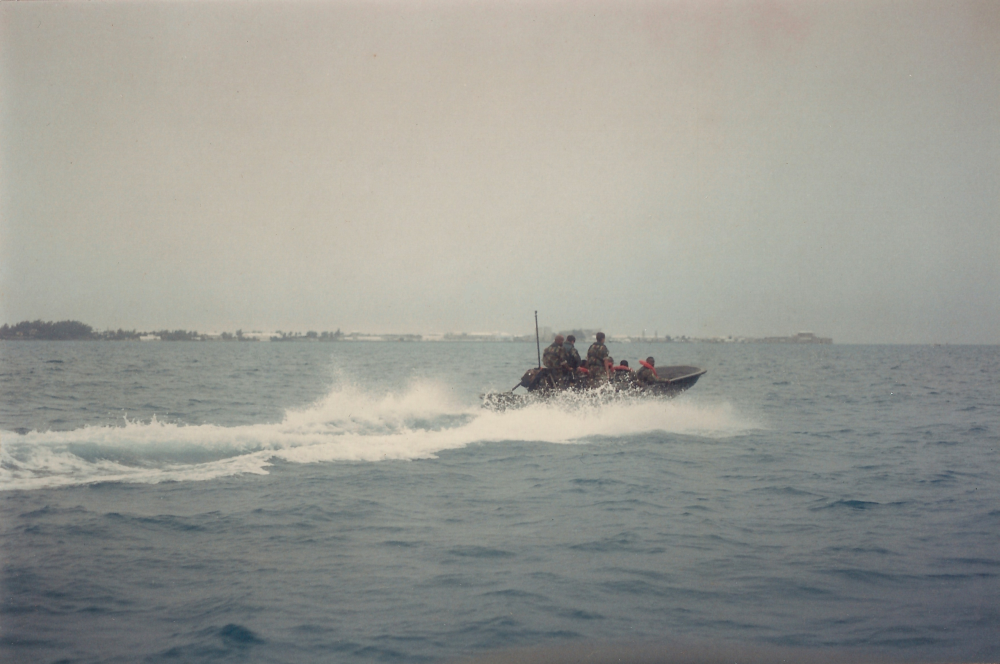
Grassy Bay, formerly the main anchorage of the North America and West Indies Squadron, with the Royal Naval Dockyard on Ireland Island in the background.

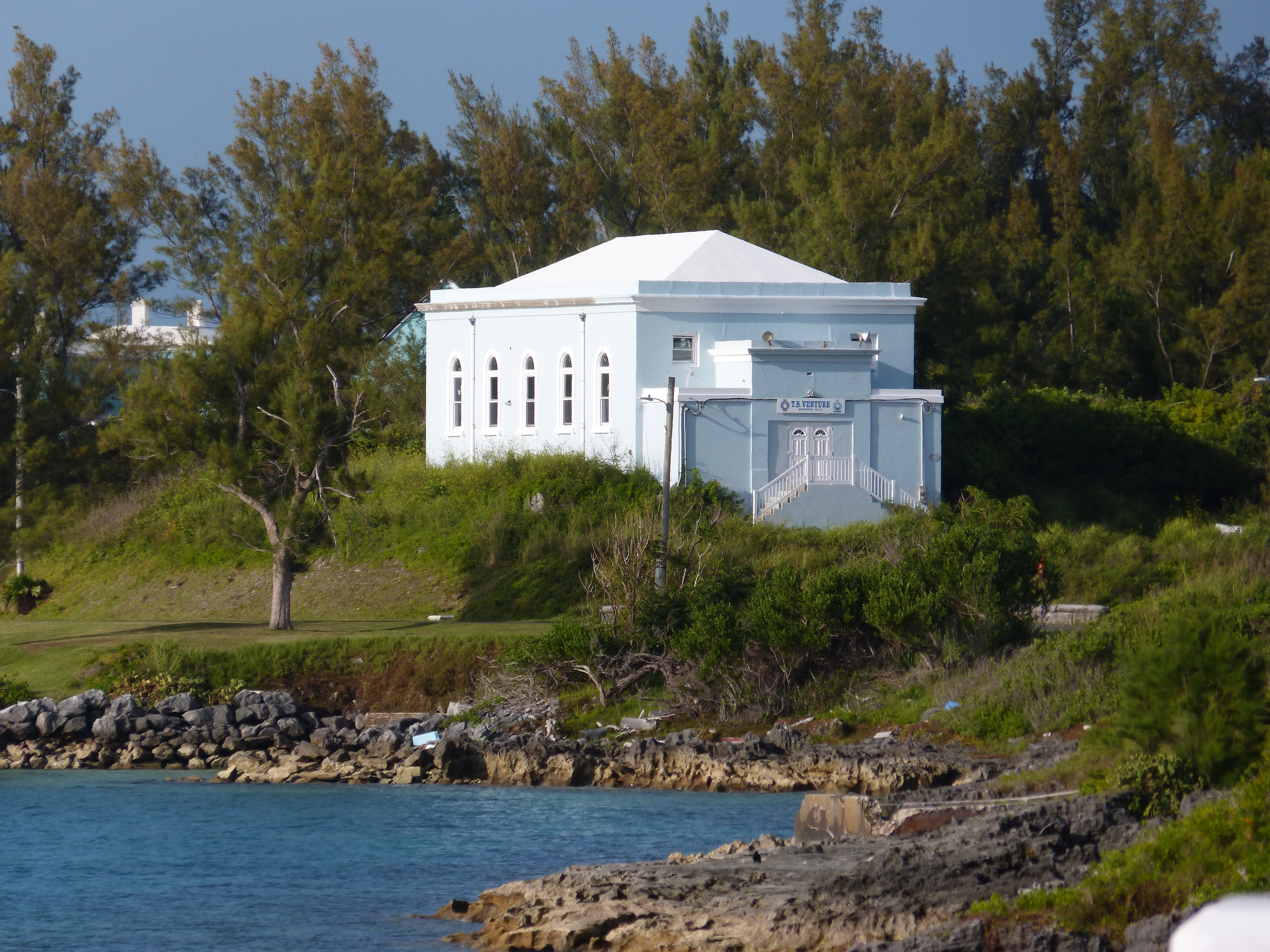
Sea Cadet Corps TS Venture, on Ireland Island, Bermuda

== Administration of the dockyard ==
These lists are for senior officers within the administration of the Royal Naval Dockyard. For the senior naval officer in Bermuda, see Commanders-in-Chief of the North America and West Indies Station

Up until 1831 all navy dockyards, were administered by a Resident Commissioner on behalf of the Navy Board in London. By An Order in Council dated 27 June 1832 the role of the Resident Commissioner was replaced by either a Captain or Commodore or Admiral Superintendent depending on the size of the yard.

=== Resident commissioners ===
Post holders included:

- Captain Andrew Fitzherbert Evans, July 1811 – 1817
- Captain J. M. Lewis 1817–1821
- Captain Thomas Briggs 1823–1829
- Captain, the Hon. Thomas Ussher, 1830–1831

=== Captain/commodore/rear-admiral superintendents ===
Post holders included:

- Commodore, Sir Thomas Ussher, 1832–1838

Note: no superintendents appointed from 1839 to 1847 just a resident store-keeper.

- Captain George Le Geyt Bowyear, August 1869–September 1870
- Captain Elphinstone D'Oyly D'Auvergne Aplin, 1870-1875
- Captain Leveson Eliot Henry Somerset, 1875-1878
- Captain Henry John Carr, 1 January 1892
- Captain John William Brackenbury, 7 June 1894 - 10 October 1896
- Captain William Harvey Pigott, 28 January 1897 – 1 September 1899
- Captain Thomas MacGill, 28 June 1899 – 7 August 1902
- Captain Henry Leah, 28 June 1902 – 29 March 1905
- Captain Henry H. Bruce, 1 March 1905 – 20 March 1906
- Commander Noel Grant, 20 March 1906 – 9 January 1909
- Captain Basil Hew Fanshawe, 9 January 1909 – 1 July 1911
- Commander Godfrey E. Corbett, 1 July 1911 – 15 June 1914
- Rear-Admiral Morgan Singer, 15 December 1917
- Captain Basil Hew Fanshawe, 1 June 1919 – 16 April 1921
- Captain Cecil Horace Pilcher, 1 October 1922 – November 1924
- Captain Aubrey T. Tillard, 23 October 1924 – c. 18 November 1926
- Captain Colin A. M. Sarel, 21 October 1926 – 16 November 1928
- Captain Reginald Vesey Holt, 18 October 1928 – November 1930
- Captain Henry Bradford Maltby, 16 October 1930
- Captain Francis H. G. Walker, 23 November 1932 – 6 November 1934
- Captain Edye K. Boddam-Whetham, 6 November 1934 – 17 November 1936
- Captain Edward Conyngham Denison, 21 October 1936 – 16 December 1938

=== Commodores in charge ===
- Commodore Charles Hugo Knox-Little, 15 January 1944 – 31 January 1944
- Commodore Charles Hugo Knox-Little, 7 August 1944 – July, 1946

=== Senior Naval Officers, West Indies ===
Post holders included:

- Commodore George E. Hunt: April 1956-June 1958 - Senior Naval Officer, West Indies
- Commodore W. John Parker: June 1958-January 1960
- Commodore Hinton C.J. Shand: January 1960-June 1961
- Commodore John E.L. Martin: June 1961-July 1963
- Commodore Edward B. Ashmore: July 1963-December 1964
- Commodore Hubert H. Dannreuther: December 1964-August 1966
- Commodore John M. Townley: August 1966-November 1968
- Commodore Martin N. Lucey: November 1968-June 1970
- Commodore David G. Roome: June 1970-March 1972
- Commodore Cameron Rusby: March 1972-May 1974, Senior Naval Officer West Indies
- Commodore Bryan J. Straker: May 1974-June 1976
