= The Talbot Brothers of Bermuda =

Bermudan musical group

The Talbot Brothers
- Origin: Bermuda
- Genres: Calypso; swing; traditional pop
- Years active: 1942 – 1980s
- Past members: Archie Talbot; Austin Talbot; Bryan Talbot; Ross Talbot; Roy Talbot; Cromwell Manders; Ernest Stovell (or Stowell)

The Talbot Brothers were a musical group based in Bermuda that were among the most popular calypso performers of the 1950s. The band was composed of brothers Archie (lead singer, acoustic guitar, harmonica), Austin (acoustic guitar, harmonica), Bryan, a.k.a. "Dick" (tiple, a large, 10-stringed ukulele), Ross, a.k.a. "Blackie" (electric guitar) and Roy Talbot (bass), and their cousin Cromwell "Mandy" Mandres (accordion).

== Early life and background ==
Austin Gerald Talbot (1905–1985), Archibald Maxwell Talbot (1907–1972), Roy Almer Denmond Talbot (1915–2009), Hastings Ross Fanshaw Talbot (1918–2000), and Bryan Kingston Talbot (1920–1979) were the sons of Osmond Charles Fanshaw Talbot and Mamie Susan Kennedy Augusta Lambert, who had married in 1904, with an extended family centred in Tucker's Town (the only part of the Main Island that lies within St. George's Parish) and eastern Hamilton Parish, between Bailey's Bay and Paynter's Vale. Talbots had lived in this area since at least the 18th Century, and the brothers were related by descent to many other families of this area, including the Seon and Outerbridge families. The progenitors of the Talbot family were Josiah Talbot (1811–1878) and Ann Nancy Gilbert (1824–1871), both of whom had been born into slavery but freed when slavery was abolished throughout the British Empire in 1833. The couple had four children, Henry Thomas Talbot, Emma Louisa Talbot, Horatio Talbot and Solomon Austin Talbot (1846–1907), the ancestor of the Talbot Brothers. Solomon married Isabella Seon on 21 June 1868 in Hamilton Parish (who may have been the daughter of Englesbe Seon and his wife Isabella (née Eve) and the granddaughter of his mother's former owners Thomas Seon and Mary Seon (née Outerbridge). Solomon and Isabella had seven children, including Osmond Charles Fanshawe Talbot. The brothers had five other siblings. Their mother's sister, Ainslie Letitia Dansmore Lambert, married Charles Adolphus Mansfield Manders in 1895, and gave birth to William Cromwell Manders in 1906. The Talbot Brothers also have produced several notable descendants, including:

Clement Talbot, son of Hastings Ross Fanshaw Talbot: a retired Head of Commercial Banking at Bank of Bermuda (HSBC Bank Bermuda) who in 2014 had an audience with Queen Elizabeth II after being appointed an MBE in the Queen's 2013 Birthday Honours for his services to the Bermuda community, through the Ross “Blackie” Talbot Foundation, which raised nearly $4 million for charitable causes, and the Ross “Blackie” Talbot Charity Classic golf tournament.

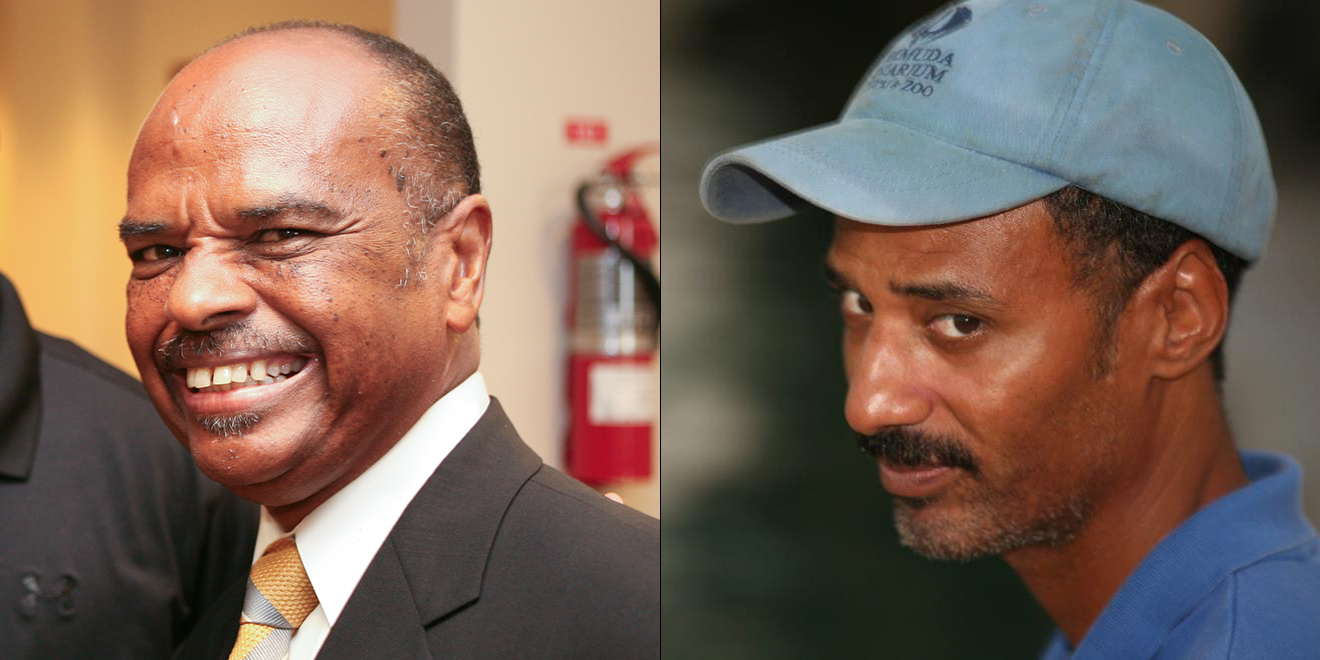
Clement Talbot MBE (left) and Patrick Talbot (right)

Brent Talbot, son of Roy Talbot: a singer who released pop-soul and R&B music in the early 1970s for Metromedia Records, notably releasing the 1970 singles "Sleep Tight 'Til Morning", "Don't You Call My Name," and “Tomorrow’s Man To Be”, which were produced by Tommy James & Bob James and arranged by Jim Hunter and Talman Records, including the single “There Goes My Heart".

Patrick Talbot, grandson of Roy Talbot: a biologist and Curator at the Bermuda Aquarium, Museum and Zoo (BAMZ) who has served the Bermuda community since 1992 through his work at BAMZ, conserving and rehabilitating injured wildlife (including sea turtles and birds, Harbour seals and other animals) and educating generations of young Bermudians about the fauna of the archipelago. He has also conducted extensive field research on the Bermuda Longtail or White-tailed Tropicbird and on 1 May 2026 he met with King Charles III and showed him the release of a rehabilitated longtail during the King's visit to Trunk Island in Harrington Sound.

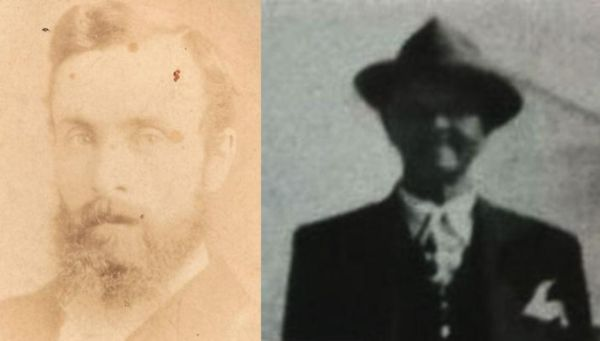
Oliver Constantine Lambert and Osmond Charles Fanshaw Talbot

Most of the signatories of 23 July 1920, petition by residents of Tucker's Town against the planned land acquisitions and redevelopment called for in the "Bermuda Development Company Act (No. 2), 1920" were related to the Talbot Brothers, including their maternal grandfather, Oliver Constantine Lambert (born in Southampton Parish, the son of Samuel Deers Lambert and Ann Newbold), parents Osmond Charles Fanshaw Talbot and Ainslie Letitia Dansmore Manders, maternal uncles Stewart Hastings Lambert and Oliver Ceylon Lambert, maternal aunts Essie Celina Gertrude Lambert, Ann Mahew Constantine Simmons, and Ada Permelia Arlene Simmons, and other relatives Eliza Harriet Talbot (Smith), Rose Ann Smith, Dina Smith (the sister of their maternal grandmother, Rose Ann Lambert, born Rose Ann Smith), and five other Smiths, to whom they were related through both the Lambert (via their maternal grandmother) and Talbot families. Other signatories were Minnie Andrew Palmer, Henry Nelms, Clarkson Frederick Burgess, Henry Thomas Harvey, Oscar Anderson, and Lancelot Laud Havard, the Rector of Hamilton and Smith's Glebe. The petition was unsuccessful and Tucker's Town was compulsorily purchased with Dina Smith the last resident to leave when she was forcibly removed from her property in 1923. Many of their relatives were participants in the civil suit of the descendants of Josiah Smith (the maternal grandfather of Mamie Susan Kennedy Augusta Lambert and Ainslie Letitia Dansmore Lambert) against the Bermuda Development Company in the Supreme Court in 1924 that resulted in compensation paid to the descendants for the land known as the Josiah Smith Estate at Tucker's Town.

== Career ==
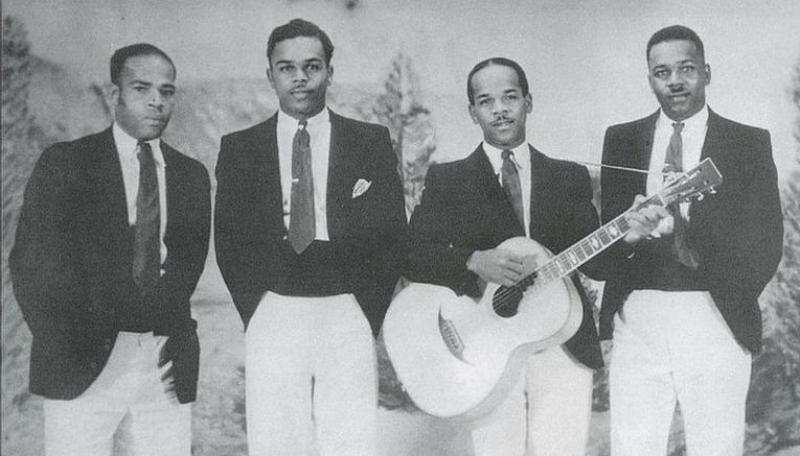
The original members of the Talbot Brothers circa 1936: Ernest Stovell, Roy, Archie and Austin Talbot

The Talbots were the first of Bermuda's many notable singing groups to gain international acclaim. With a population of fewer than 20,000 scattered over numerous islands totalling 21 square miles, Bermuda had no professional musicians or theatres until the advent of tourism during the latter 19th Century. The tourism industry was pioneered by wealthy visitors from North America, such as Samuel Clemens and Princess Louise, who would winter in Bermuda. New large hotels were built to cater to them, notably the Hamilton Hotel (completed in 1863), the Princess Hotel (completed in 1885), and the Hotel St. George (completed in 1906), and these created employment opportunities for professional musicians. Beyond the hotels, public entertainment relied primarily upon amateur theatrics and music hall-type performances, notably by soldiers assigned to the Bermuda Garrison.

After the First World War, Bermuda's tourism industry went through considerable change as Prohibition led to a flood of affluent middle class visitors seeking sun and alcohol, and Bermuda became a summer rather than a winter destination. The large urban hotels were replaced by resorts sandwiched between private beaches and golf courses, such as the Castle Harbour Hotel, built near Paynter's Vale in the 1920s, and the Elbow Beach Hotel (which had been completed before the war, in 1913). The construction of the Castle Harbour Hotel (completed in 1931) and the related Mid-Ocean Club had resulted in the forced relocation of the inhabitants of Tucker's Town, with their homes replaced by golf links. The families that had lived there, including the Talbots, were mostly resettled in Smith's Parish (a parish also known as Harris' Bay, from the coastal area at the southern end of its western boundary with Devonshire Parish, today identified as Devonshire Bay and Sue Wood Bay) near Devil's Hole and John Smith's Bay, where Talbot Lane is found today. Bermuda's new visitors demanded entertainments that the genteel community was ill-equipped to provide, including a new type of music. Musical tastes in Bermuda were little different from North America and Britain. West Indian musicians were consequently brought in by the hotels, and local musicians quickly adopted the Calypso they brought with them. The entertainments provided for tourists through the hotels remained separate and quite different, however, from the entertainments that catered to Bermudians, which still relied largely upon amateurs performing in church halls and similar venues.

One such entertainment was the 25 May 1934, Southern United States-influenced concert at the Grand United Order of Odd Fellows Hall in Somerset Village (at the West End of Bermuda) given by the Ladies' Aid Society of the Marsden Methodist Church of Smith's Parish (to where the church had been re-located in 1923 from Tucker's Town), an account of which was published in the Bermuda Recorder on 2 June 1934. The performers evidently included the earliest members of the Talbot Brothers (with Roy and Bryan Talbot named, as were their parents, their sister Merle Genevieve Carmen Talbot, and Roy Talbot's mother-in-law Mrs. Bertha Aduza Smith):

The Ladies Aid Society of the Marsden Methodist Church of Harris Bay gave an old fashioned concert at G. U. O. of O.F. Hall Somerset on Friday evening 25th May. They were assisted by the Barber Shop Four, who are well known at the East End, having performed at the Castle Harbour Hotel and other places. Every available seat was occupied long before the time of opening the programme. The sceneries were exceptionally good, and had a touch of the old fashioned plantation days; the parts were very humorous and a few were encored. The programme was as follows:- Opening Chorus, "My Old Kentucky Home;" Parade. "Get you Ready, there's a meeting here to-night"; Solo, "Susan Jane;" Solo, "Dreaming of Home", Mrs Bertha Smith; Solo, "The Curse of an aching heart", Mrs Pearl Lamb; Solo, "What'll I do", Mr Roy Talbot; Duet, "Fifty years ago", Mrs Nancy Wilson and Mr O. Talbot; Solo, "Uncle Ned", Mr Byron Talbot; Sketch, The Barber Shop Four; Scene and Chorus "Carry me back to Old Virginia" Sketch and Chorus, "Carve the Possum"; Solo, "The Leading Lady", Mrs O. Talbot; Recitation, "People will Talk", Mrs Clara Talbot; Solo, "After you're gone", Miss M. Talbot; Solo, Mr Alfred Darrel; Sketch "A rumpus on Ginger Bread Hill" Quartette, The Barber Shop Four; Duet, "Sailor Boy", Mrs. Parker and Mrs. N. Wilson; Closing Chorus.

The Bermuda Recorder had previously printed an advertisement on 25 November 1933, reading "An up-to-date Service of Song will take place at Morris Hall, North Shore on Sunday, November 26th at 8.45 p.m. Mr Elton Bean (lyric baritone) and Talbot's Quartettee Party, etc. will participate. Admission 1/- Edith Hayward, promoter", and another advertisement on the 2 December 1933, reading "A CONCERT will be given in the Talbot School Room, Harris Bay, By the HARRISII GLEE CLUB, Assisted by friends on Friday, Dec. 8th, 1933 at 8.30 p.m. All the latest Songs, rendered by such talent as The Barber Shop Four and various performers of Tid Bits. Admission 1/- and 1/6. Proceeds in aid of the Marsden Sunday School, Harris Bay".

Before achieving a degree of fame with their best-known line-up, the Talbot Brothers had originally been composed in the 1930s of Austin Gerald Talbot, Archibald Maxwell Talbot, Roy Almer Denmond Talbot, and their cousin Ernest Stovell. As the Talbot Brothers, of Tucker's Town, quartet, accompanied by banjo, they won third prize at an amateur concert at the exclusive Coral Island Club in Flatts Village, in Hamilton Parish, on 1 March 1936.

The Second World War (1939–1945) would strangle Bermuda's tourism industry. Many hotels were adapted for use as barracks or for recreation by members of the Allied armed forces. The Castle Harbour Hotel was taken over by the United States Army for use by the personnel constructing Kindley Field. As an important Imperial fortress, vital to Allied victory in the Battle of the Atlantic, most of Bermuda's military-aged men not employed in trades vital to the war effort, or otherwise ineligible to serve, volunteered (or were conscripted) to serve in the British Army, the Royal Navy and Royal Marines, the Royal Air Force, or other British or Dominion forces. This included Bryan Kingston Talbot, who served in the Bermuda Militia Infantry (regimental number M-181). Tourism returned quickly after the war. An advertisement for the Harrington House hotel of Hamilton Parish in the 21 March 1946 issue of The Royal Gazette newspaper read:

Harrington House

Dancing, Saturday Night
From 7.30 to closing
BERMUDA LOBSTER STEAKS
SOUTHERN FRIED CHICKEN AND CHOPS
MUSIC BY TALBOT BROS.

Reservations for Dinner — Phone 7283

The Talbots performed a variation of Trinidadian calypso in a smooth melodic style influenced by popular music. They performed and recorded cover versions of calypso classics in addition to many of their own originals. They became a popular attraction in local hotels, but it was an early recording they made in the United States that made them even more popular in their homeland, and heralded fame beyond their shores. Bermuda Buggy Ride, according to the essay "Gombeys, Bands and Troubadours" on Bermuda's official website...

...brought them wide recognition in the USA, and made them the group tourists most wanted to see. The song was a swing ballad and was actually written… in a buggy en route to Tom Moore’s Tavern. A young student from Yale was in the buggy, and he seems to have had a hand in the evolution of the song. On arriving at their destination, the musicians rehearsed the song until it was ready for performance that very day. It’s been riding along ever since.

Their popularity with American tourists resulted in tours of the U.S. starting in the early 1950s. Notable in their instrumentation was Roy Talbot's home-made upright bass dubbed the "doghouse." Roy created the instrument out of a large meat-packing crate and a single fishing line. This item was a particular curiosity, and during the Talbots’ tours many of their fellow performers and visiting celebrities would autograph the crate.

The Talbots released 10" and 12" vinyl records on the small Audio Fidelity label in the mid-1950s before being signed to ABC Paramount Records in 1957, where they made two LPs that were more accessible in North America.

They were frequent performers on television in the 1950s, appearing on Ed Sullivan's variety shows and other programs.

Archie Talbot composed the title song to the 1956 Columbia motion picture Bermuda Affair. It is included on their first ABC Paramount LP.

Ross, the penultimate survivor of the group, died in 2000 at the age of 82. An avid golfer, there is an annual charity golf tournament in Bermuda dedicated to him.

Bassist Roy Talbot, who died on 15 May 2009, was the last surviving brother.

== Recordings ==
Notable songs recorded by The Talbot Brothers include:

- "Atomic Nightmare" (Archie Talbot)
- "Back to Back (Zombie Jamboree)" (Lord Intruder)
- "Bermuda Buggy Ride" (Archie Talbot)
- "Bermuda Affair" (Archie Talbot)
- "Bermuda’s Still Paradise" (Ross Talbot)
- "Castro Twist" (Ross Talbot)
- "Old Uncle Joe" (Roy Talbot)
- "Give an Ugly Woman Matrimony" (Ross Talbot - F. Reid)
- "Gonna Cut You with the Razor" (Archie Talbot - F. Reid)
- "Is She Is or Is She Ain’t" (The Charmer)
- "Last Train to San Fernando" (Mighty Dictator)
- "Nora, Nora" (Lord Kitchener)
- "She's Got Freckles On Her But She Is Nice" (no author listed; sometimes attributed to Larry Vincent)
- "You Can Go, But You'll Return" (Archie Talbot - F. Reid)

== Partial discography ==
- Bermuda Talbot Brothers in their favorite selections Jay 3009 (10")
- Bermuda Talbot Brothers ("Bermuda, Vol. 2"); Audio Fidelity AFLP-903 (10")
- Bermuda Calypso Party ("Bermuda, Vol. 3"); Audio Fidelity AFLP-1807; c.1957
- Calypsos; ABC-Paramount ABC-156; 1957
- Calypso; ABC-Paramount A-156; 1957 (7" E.P.; excerpts from above)
- Talbot Brothers of Bermuda; ABC-Paramount ABC-214
- Talbot Brothers of Bermuda (Volumes 1–3); Talman (reissue)
- Bermuda Holiday; Polyphonic Records (Bermuda) FLP-2001, 1960
