= ...That's the Way It Is =

...That's The Way It Is

Studio album by Nilsson
- Released: June 1976
- Studio: Davlen Sound Studios, Sound Labs and RCA's Music Center of the World, Hollywood, California
- Genre: Pop
- Length: 32:15
- Label: RCA Victor
- Producer: Trevor Lawrence

Nilsson chronology
Sandman (1976)	...That's The Way It Is (1976)	Knnillssonn (1977)

Singles from ...That's the Way It Is
- 1. "Sail Away" / "Moonshine Bandit" Released: April 1976; 2. "Just One Look/Baby I'm Yours" / "That Is All" Released: August 1976

Professional ratings
Review scores
Source	Rating
AllMusic	2/5 stars
The Essential Rock Discography	4/10
The Rolling Stone Album Guide	2/5 stars

...That's the Way It Is is the thirteenth album by American singer Harry Nilsson, released in 1976 on RCA Records. Aside from two original songs, the album consists of cover tunes.

The songs include "That Is All", written by George Harrison and originally released on Living in the Material World in 1973; America's "I Need You", from their eponymous 1971 album; Randy Newman's "Sail Away", from his 1972 album of the same name; and the Heartbeats' "A Thousand Miles Away". Harrison's song was recorded twice by Nilsson, to open and close the album.

Another cover version on ...That's the Way It Is, the calypso "Zombie Jamboree", had previously been recorded by Lord Intruder, Kingston Trio and Harry Belafonte, among others. Nilsson's medley of the Doris Troy hit "Just One Look" and Barbara Lewis' "Baby I'm Yours" was performed as a duet with singer Lynda Laurence. The latter, formerly of the Supremes, was the wife of Nilsson's producer, Trevor Lawrence.

== Track listing ==
No.	Title	Writer(s)	Length
1.	"That Is All"	George Harrison	3:02
2.	"Just One Look/Baby I'm Yours" (duet with Lynda Laurence)	Gregory Carroll, Doris Payne/Van McCoy	3:17
3.	"Moonshine Bandit"	Harry Nilsson, Danny Kortchmar	3:26
4.	"I Need You"	Gerry Beckley	3:14
5.	"A Thousand Miles Away"	James Sheppard, William Miller	2:50
6.	"Sail Away"	Randy Newman	3:40
7.	"She Sits Down on Me"	Austin Talbot	3:55
8.	"Daylight Has Caught Me"	Nilsson, Malcolm Rebennack	3:47
9.	"Zombie Jamboree (Back to Back)"	Conrad E. Mauge, Jr.	3:02
10.	"That Is All" (reprise)	Harrison	1:32

== Personnel ==
Credits per original album cover and Allmusic:

- Harry Nilsson – vocals
- Lynda Laurence – duet vocals on "Just One Look/Baby I'm Yours", backing vocals
- Tony La Peau – guest vocals on "A Thousand Miles Away"
- Danny Kortchmar, Jesse Ed Davis, Fred Tackett, Lon & Derrek Van Eaton, Keith Allison, Dennis Budimir, Peter Jameson, John Morell, David Wolfert, Mike Anthony – guitar
- Dr. John, Van Dyke Parks, Jane Getz, David Paich, James Newton Howard – keyboards
- Malcolm Cecil – synthesizer
- Klaus Voormann – bass
- Jim Keltner, Chili Charles – drums
- Tom Collier, Gene Estes – timpani
- Robert Greenidge – steel drums
- Doug Hoefer – percussion
- Bobby Keys, Gene Cipriano, James Roberts, Buddy Collette, Joe Darensbourg, William Green, Jim Horn, Johnny Rotella - saxophone
- Andrew Blakeney, Steve Madaio, Anthony Terran – trumpet
- Vincent DeRosa, David Duke, Henry Sigismonti - French horn
- Herbie Harper, Lew McCreary, Richard Taylor "Dick" Nash, Benny Powell - trombone
- Sid Sharp, Murray Adler, Israel Baker, Arnold Belnick, Assa Drori, Henry Ferber, Ronald Folsom, James Getzoff, Harris Goldman, Edward Green, Nathan Kaproff, William Kurash, Carl LaMagna, Joy Lyle, Leonard Malarsky, Ralph Schaeffer, Paul Shure, Polly Sweeney, Tibor Zelig - violin
- Meyer Bello, Samuel Boghossian, Louis Cievman, Rollice Dale, Allan Harshman, Harry Hyams, Michael Nowak, David Schwartz - viola
- Raphael Dramer, Jesse Ehrlich, Armand Karpoff, Ray Kelley, Jerome Kessler, Harry Shlutz – cello
- Jimmy Bond, Peter Mercurio, Mickey Nadel - double bass
- Charles Gould, Melvin Tax - bassoon
- Deidra Askey, Richard Glasser, Joseph Greene, Abigale Haness, Monalisa Harrington, John Lehman, Sherlie Matthews, Bill Thedford – backing vocals
- Richie Schmitt, Tommy Vicari - engineer

== Charts ==
Chart (1976)	Peak position
U.S. Billboard 200	158
