= Jumbie Jamberee =

"Jumbie Jamberee" is a calypso song credited to Conrad Eugene Mauge, Jr. In 1953 Lord Intruder released the song as the B-side to "Disaster With Police". The song is also known as "Zombie Jamboree" and "Back to Back". The introduction to the Kingston Trio's version humorously credits "Lord Invader and his Twelve Penetrators" with authorship of the song instead of Lord Intruder.

The oldest versions of the song refer to a jumbee jamboree. Jumbies are evil spirits who were thought to cause wild dancing in their victims. The song's references to Carnival also suggest a connection to the Moko jumbie, a protective spirit figure represented during Carnival on Trinidad by stilt walkers and dancers. The switch to "Zombie Jamboree" occurred very early with King Flash's version with those lyrics coming out in 1956, only three years after "Jumbie Jamboree" first appeared.

Like many "folk" songs, there is unclear copyright in the song and many lines are variable between versions. While many versions set the song in a New York, Long Island or Woodlawn Cemetery, some place it in Kingston or an island cemetery. The third verse is the most variable, with The Charmer's version discussing the local food at a previous jumbie Carnival parade while Rockapella's version discusses zombies and King Kong invading various New York City landmarks. The third verse of King Flash's 1956 version further discusses the female zombie's romantic pursuit of the singer.

John Sterling, the longtime New York Yankees radio announcer, routinely quotes the song after consecutive hit home runs, saying "back to back, and belly to belly!"

== Notable cover versions ==
- "Back to Back, Belly to Belly" by The Charmer (Louis Farrakhan) with Johnny McCleverty Calypso Boys recorded in 1954.
- King Flash and Calypso Carnival recorded a version of "Zombie Jamboree" in 1956.
- Jamaican mento singer Lord Foodoos recorded "Back to Back" for his 1957 Elektra album Calypso, an early production by Jac Holzman, who later produced The Doors, Nico and The Stooges among others.
- A version of "Jumbee Jamboree" appears in the 1957 movie Calypso Joe.
- Jamaican mento group The Wrigglers recorded "Back to Back" for their 1958 album At the Arawak featuring Ernest Ranglin on guitar.
- The Kingston Trio recorded "Zombie Jamboree" on their ...from the Hungry i and Stereo Concert albums, both released in early 1959.
- Harry Belafonte recorded five versions of the song (in 1962, 1964, 1966, 1972 and 1974). It first appeared on Belafonte's The Many Moods of Belafonte and later became one of his signature songs.
- Lord Jellicoe and His Calypso Monarchs recorded a version of "Zombie Jamboree" in 1962.
- Peter Tosh recorded "Jumbee Jamboree" with The Wailers in 1965. It used the original lyrics of the song (not the Zombie ones), and also added a new chorus based on "De River Ben Come Dung" by Edric Connor (a traditional Jamaican mento song). It released as a 7-inch single and was included on the 1996 CD compilation The Toughest.
- Harry Nilsson recorded a version of the song on his 1976 album …That's the Way It Is.
- The Jolly Boys recorded "Back to Back (Belly to Belly)" on their Pop 'n' Mento album in 1989.
- The a cappella group Rockapella has performed numerous versions of this song, including one on the PBS Great Performances TV special Spike Lee & Company: Do It a Cappella in 1990, and a few times on the PBS game show Where In The World Is Carmen Sandiego?.
- Mixed Company of Yale, an a cappella group from Yale University, uses the song as their alumni song.
- The Sherwoods at Cornell University recorded a highly successful and lively version in 1958, called "Zoombie Jamboree".
- Leftover Salmon recorded a version of the song for their 1993 debut album, Bridges to Bert.
- The GrooveBarbers did a cover on their 2010 album Guts under the title "Zombie Jamboree". A line of the song was changed due to the September 11 attacks, with Sean Altman changing a line to "There's an acapella zombie singing down Broadway" instead of the line that he and Rockapella had sung for years, "There's a high-wire zombie between the World Trades".
- A cover of the song by vocal group Dave Kennedy & The Ambassadors was used in the web comedy series PEN15 season 2 episode 5 "Sleepover".
- Filk group Clam Chowder performed it frequently in concert and also on their 1980 album Stewed, as "Zombie Jamboree".
