= 1915 Atlantic hurricane season =

- Season summary map

Seasonal boundaries
- First system formed: April 29, 1915
- Last system dissipated: October 22, 1915

Strongest storm
- Name: "New Orleans"
  - Maximum winds: 145 mph (230 km/h) (1-minute sustained)
  - Lowest pressure: 931 mbar (hPa; 27.49 inHg)

Seasonal statistics
- Total depressions: 10
- Total storms: 6
- Hurricanes: 5
- Major hurricanes (Cat. 3+): 3
- Total fatalities: At least 708
- Total damage: $43.35 million (1915 USD)

Related articles
- 1910s Pacific hurricane seasons; 1902-19 Pacific typhoon seasons; 1910s North Indian Ocean cyclone seasons

The 1915 Atlantic hurricane season was an active Atlantic hurricane season in which six tropical storms developed. The first storm, which remained a tropical depression, appeared on April 29 near the Bahamas, while the final system, also a tropical depression, was absorbed by an extratropical cyclone well south of Newfoundland on October 22. Of the six tropical storms, five intensified into a hurricane, of which three further strengthened into a major hurricane. (Note: Hurricanes reaching Category 3 (111 mph or 179 km/h) and higher on the five-level Saffir–Simpson scale are considered major hurricanes.) Four of the hurricanes made landfall in the United States. The early 20th century lacked modern forecasting and documentation, and thus, the hurricane database from these years may be incomplete.

One of the most significant storms of the season was the Galveston hurricane. It was the strongest tropical cyclone to make landfall in the United States since the 1900 Galveston hurricane. This storm caused devastation across the Greater Antilles, before making landfall in Texas as a Category 4 hurricane on the modern-day Saffir–Simpson scale, the first system to strike the United States at that intensity since the 1900 Galveston hurricane. Throughout its path, the hurricane caused at least 403 fatalities and approximately $30 million (1915 USD) in damage. (Note: All damage figures are 1915 USD unless otherwise noted) Another powerful and devastating storm was the New Orleans hurricane. This system caused extensive impacts along the central Gulf Coast of the United States, especially in southeastern Louisiana. Damage in the United States totaled $13 million, while 279 deaths occurred. Overall, the tropical cyclones of the 1915 Atlantic hurricane season collectively resulted in at least 708 fatalities and more than $43.35 million in damage.

== Season summary ==
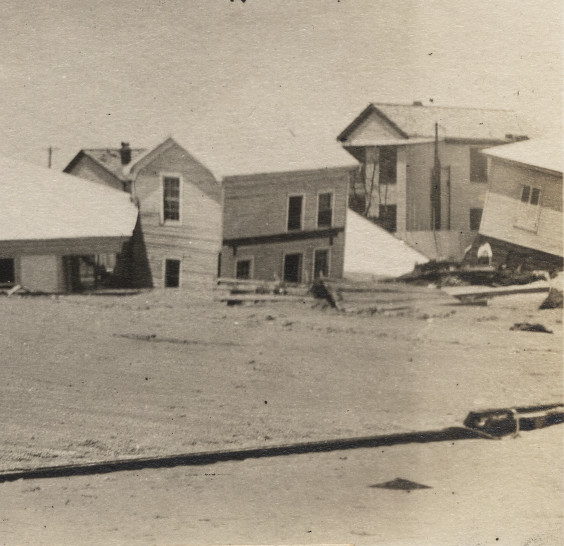
Houses submerged in sand following the Galveston hurricane

Tropical cyclogenesis began on April 29, when a tropical depression formed near the eastern Bahamas. The depression dissipated on May 3. No further activity occurred for nearly three months, until the next system developed near the northern Bahamas on July 31. Three tropical cyclones developed in August, all of which intensified into hurricanes. September featured a hurricane, a tropical storm, and a tropical depression. The hurricane which developed in that month was the New Orleans hurricane, the strongest tropical cyclone of the season, peaking with maximum sustained winds of 145 mph (230 km/h) and a minimum barometric pressure of 931 mbar (27.5 inHg). Two systems formed in October, both of which remained below tropical storm intensity. The latter was absorbed by an extratropical cyclone well south of Newfoundland on October 22, ending seasonal activity.

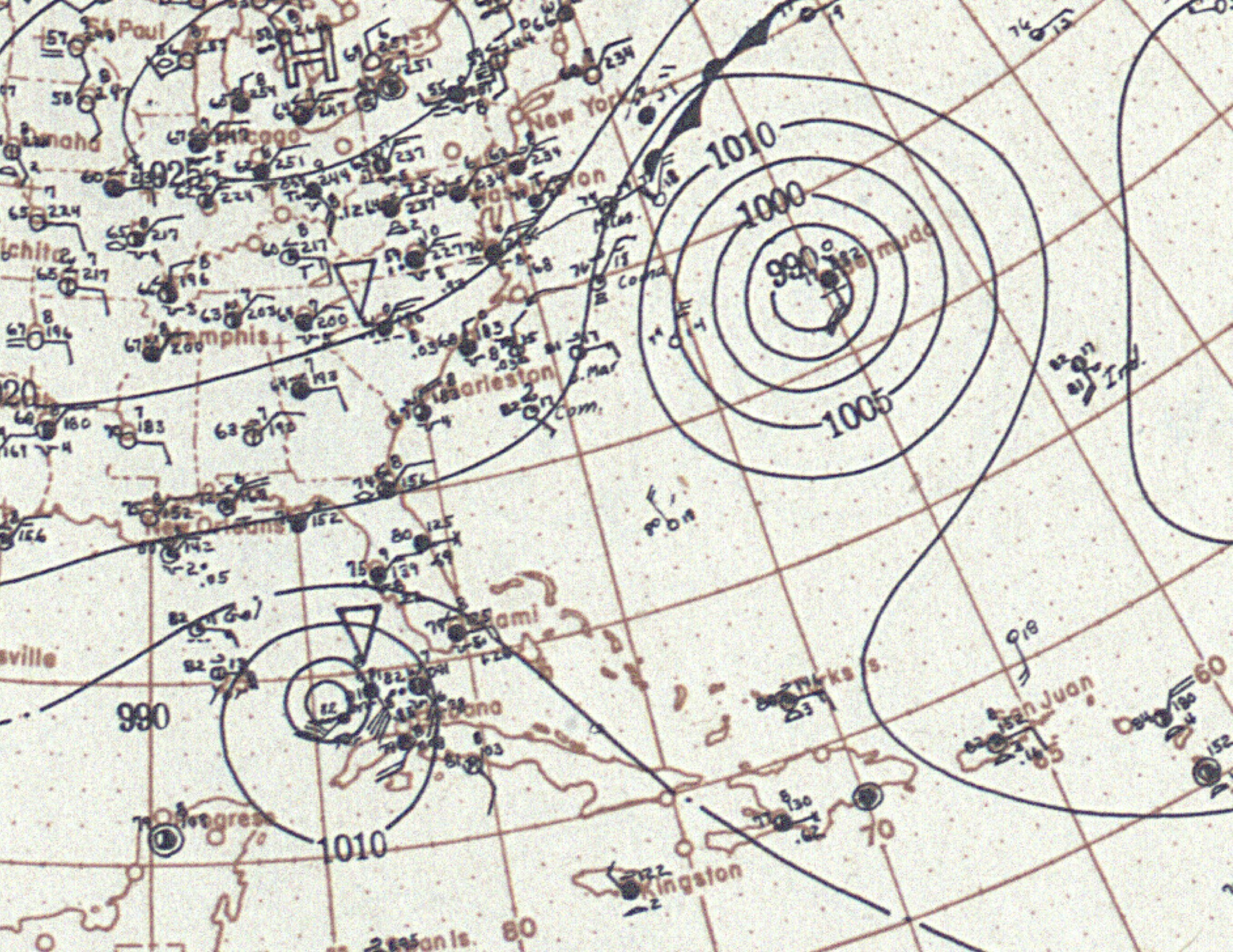
Surface weather map showing two Atlantic hurricanes active simultaneously on September 3

Overall, the season featured 10 known tropical cyclones, 6 of which became tropical storms, while 5 of those intensified into hurricanes. Further, 3 out of the 5 hurricanes reached major hurricane status according to the Saffir–Simpson scale. However, because the early 20th century lacked modern forecasting and documentation, the official hurricane database may be incomplete. The Atlantic hurricane reanalysis project in 2008 uncovered evidence for a tropical cyclone not previously in the database, Tropical Storm Five. Additionally, Hurricane One had previously been classified as a tropical storm, though the project resulted in it being upgraded to hurricane status. The season proved to be devastating despite having only six systems reaching at least tropical storm intensity, with four out of the five hurricanes striking the United States. The Galveston hurricane was the strongest and first Category 4 hurricane to make landfall in the United States since the 1900 Galveston hurricane. Collectively, the tropical cyclones of the season caused at least 708 fatalities and more than $43.35 million in damage.

The season's activity was reflected with an accumulated cyclone energy (ACE) rating of 130, the highest total since 1906 and far above the 1911–1920 average of 58.7. ACE is a metric used to express the energy used by a tropical cyclone during its lifetime. Therefore, a storm with a longer duration will have high values of ACE. It is only calculated at six-hour increments in which specific tropical and subtropical systems are either at or above sustained wind speeds of 39 mph (63 km/h), which is the threshold for tropical storm intensity. Thus, tropical depressions are not included here.

== Systems ==
=== Hurricane One ===
- Category 1 hurricane (SSHWS)
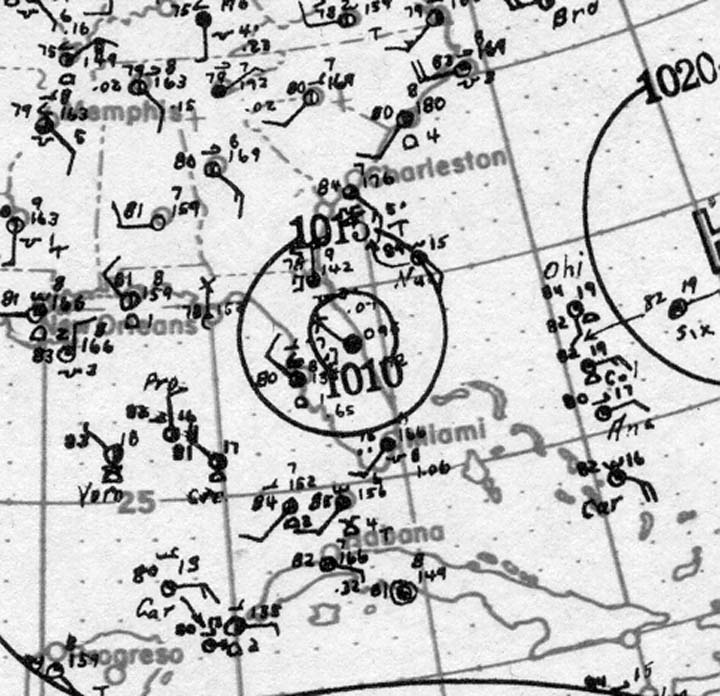
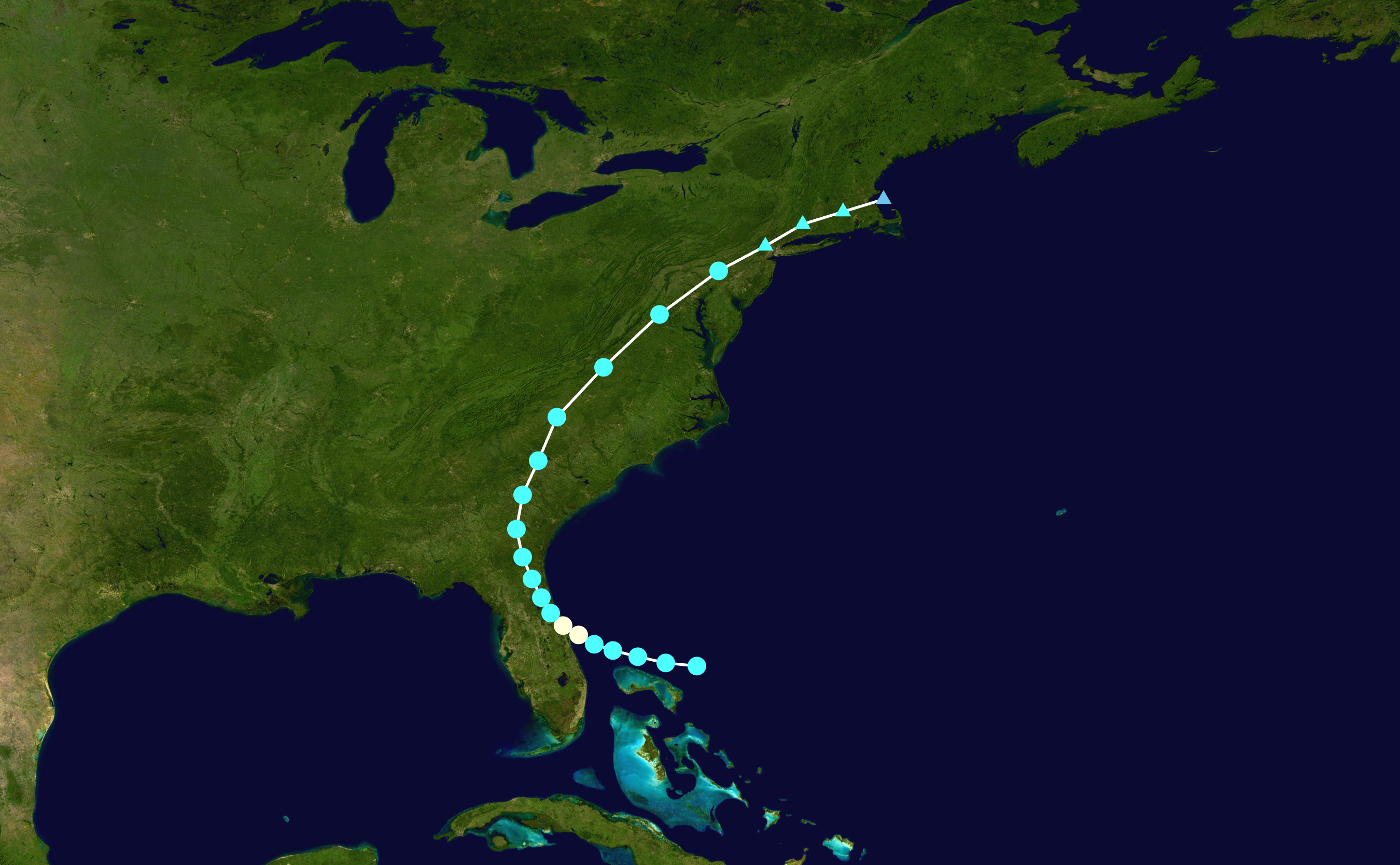
- Duration: July 31 – August 4
- Peak intensity: 75 mph (120 km/h) (1-min); 990 mbar (hPa)

The first storm of the season developed quickly, beginning as a tropical storm early on July 31 about 70 mi (115 km) northeast of the Abaco Islands in the Bahamas. The storm reached hurricane intensity the following day as it approached Florida. At 18:00 UTC on August 1, the small hurricane made landfall near Titusville, Florida, at peak strength with winds of 75 mph (120 km/h) and a minimum atmospheric pressure of 990 mbar (29 inHg). It then weakened and curved towards the northeast, taking a track across the Appalachian Mountains as a tropical storm. Slight reintensification occurred as it approached the Mid-Atlantic states, perhaps aided by baroclinic influences. Late on August 4, the system became extratropical upon merging with a frontal boundary, and later dissipated the following day.

Ahead of the hurricane's landfall, storm warnings were issued by the Weather Bureau from Jacksonville, Florida, to Fort Monroe, Virginia, and were later extended north to Boston, Massachusetts, once the storm began progressing along the U.S. East Coast. At landfall, the strongest winds occurred east of the Suwannee River, reaching 45 mph (72 km/h) in Jacksonville. Bridges, highways, and railways were damaged by the hurricane, and some buildings were toppled. The Florida East Coast Railway between Titusville and Miami was significantly damaged. The system also dropped heavy rainfall across portions of Florida, with a maximum of 16.61 inches (422 mm) recorded at St. Petersburg. Combined with the strong winds, the rain caused severe damage to crops. The damage toll was estimated to be at least $250,000. Gusty winds accompanied the storm along coastal regions of the northeastern United States, including a 53 mph (85 km/h) wind recorded in New York City. The remnants of this storm brought rainfall to Ontario, causing heavy crop losses, including 40 percent of grain in Scarborough. Five deaths occurred when an automobile slid off a bridge in Utterson.

=== Hurricane Two ===
- Category 4 hurricane (SSHWS)
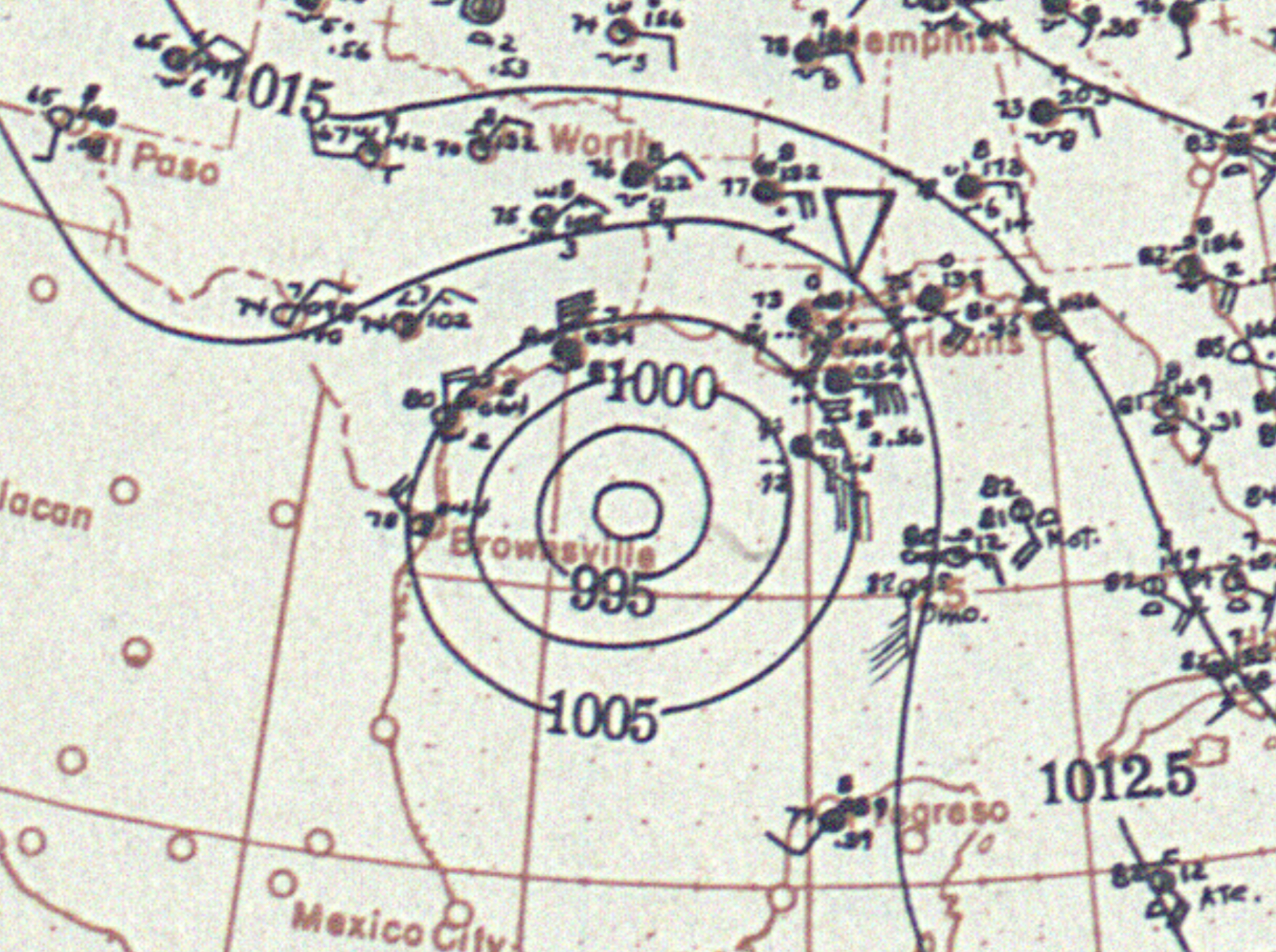
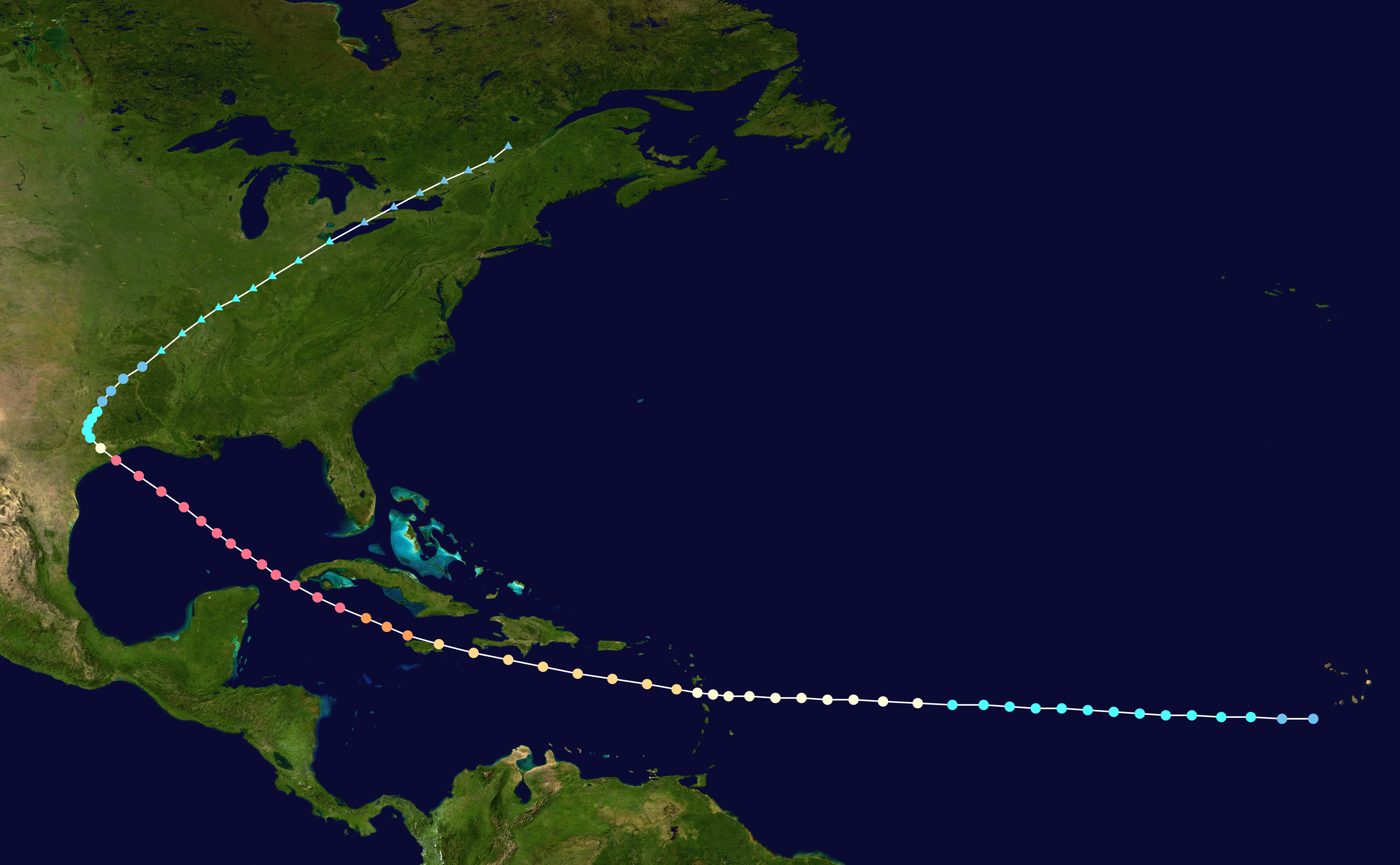
- Duration: August 5 – August 19
- Peak intensity: 145 mph (230 km/h) (1-min); 940 mbar (hPa)

The Galveston Hurricane of 1915 or Hurricane San Triburcio of 1915

A tropical depression developed near Cabo Verde on August 5. The system gradually strengthened into a hurricane as it tracked westward. On August 10, the hurricane passed between Barbados and Dominica and then entered the Caribbean Sea. Three days later, the storm passed north of Jamaica as it intensified from a Category 2 hurricane to Category 3 status. Moving northwestward, the cyclone intensified into a Category 4 hurricane on August 14 and peaked with maximum sustained winds of 145 mph (230 km/h) as it made landfall on Cuba's Guanahacabibes Peninsula. The hurricane weakened slightly while moving across the Gulf of Mexico, but remained a Category 4 through its landfall in Texas near San Luis Pass with winds of 130 mph (215 km/h) at 07:00 UTC on August 17. A barometric pressure of 940 mbar (28 inHg) was observed, the lowest known pressure in relation to the storm. After moving inland, the system rapidly weakened, falling to tropical storm intensity just 11 hours later. The cyclone then curved northeastward and deteriorated to a tropical depression near Tyler, Texas, early on August 19. Later that day, the storm transitioned into an extratropical cyclone over Arkansas. The extratropical remnants trekked across the Midwestern United States and into Canada before dissipating over Quebec on August 23.

In Dominica and Martinique, the storm caused damage to the shipping industry. As the storm passed north of Jamaica, it produced winds of 80–90 mph (130–140 km/h), causing major losses to the island's banana, beet, and sugar plantations. Additionally, storm surge washed out roads and destroyed wharves. A total of 15 fatalities and about $10 million in damage occurred in Jamaica. Strong winds in the Cayman Islands caused substantial damage, including the destruction of most houses and coconut trees on Cayman Brac, while all buildings on Little Cayman were demolished. Ten people died after the schooner Curaçao sank just offshore Grand Cayman. In the western extremity of Cuba, the hurricane destroyed all homes at Cape San Antonio and caused 14 deaths throughout the country. The hurricane also caused 101 deaths over the Gulf of Mexico, with most being a result of the steamer Marowjine capsizing in the Yucatán Channel. Storm surge inundated many cities along Galveston Bay, in some cases destroying entire towns. Galveston itself was mostly protected by a seawall, aside from 200 outlying homes that were undermined by erosion. Overall, about 90 percent of homes on Galveston Island not protected by the seawall were demolished. Most buildings suffered some degree of impact in Houston, with damage totaling $1 million. Elsewhere in East Texas, the storm produced strong winds and rainfall up to 19.83 in (505 mm) at San Augustine, causing extensive losses to cotton crops and infrastructure. At least 275 fatalities were reported in Texas, with most along the coast or at sea. Later in its duration and as an extratropical cyclone, the storm caused heavy precipitation and river flooding. In Arkansas, levees breaches along the White River, as did the Mississippi River in Illinois, submerging entire towns. In Missouri, the city of St. Louis observed its rainiest 24-hour period on record. Flooding along River des Peres and Meramec River killed 20 people and destroyed more than 1,000 homes. Damage throughout the United States totaled approximately $20 million. The hurricane was responsible for at least 403 fatalities throughout its path.

=== Hurricane Three ===
- Category 3 hurricane (SSHWS)
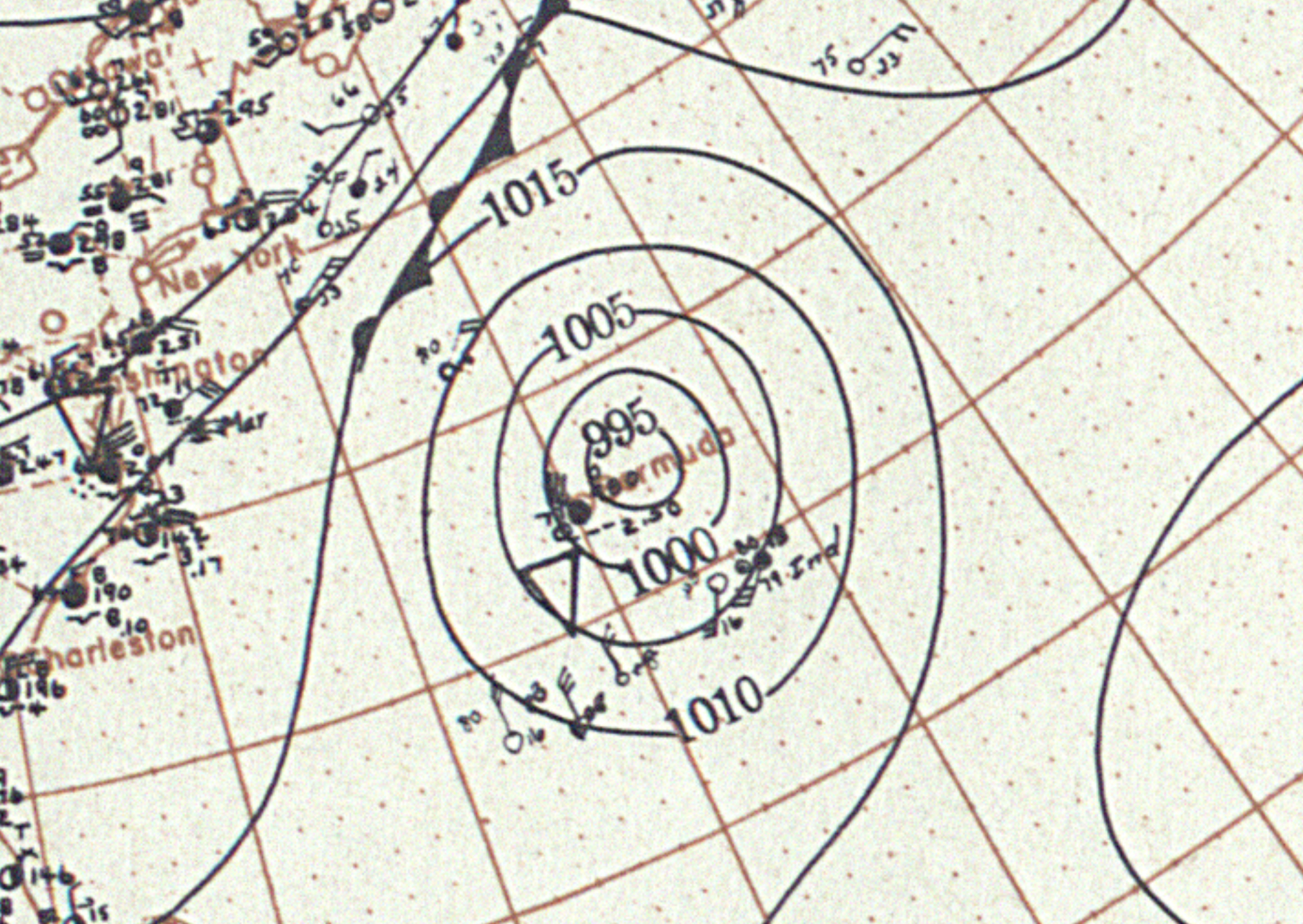
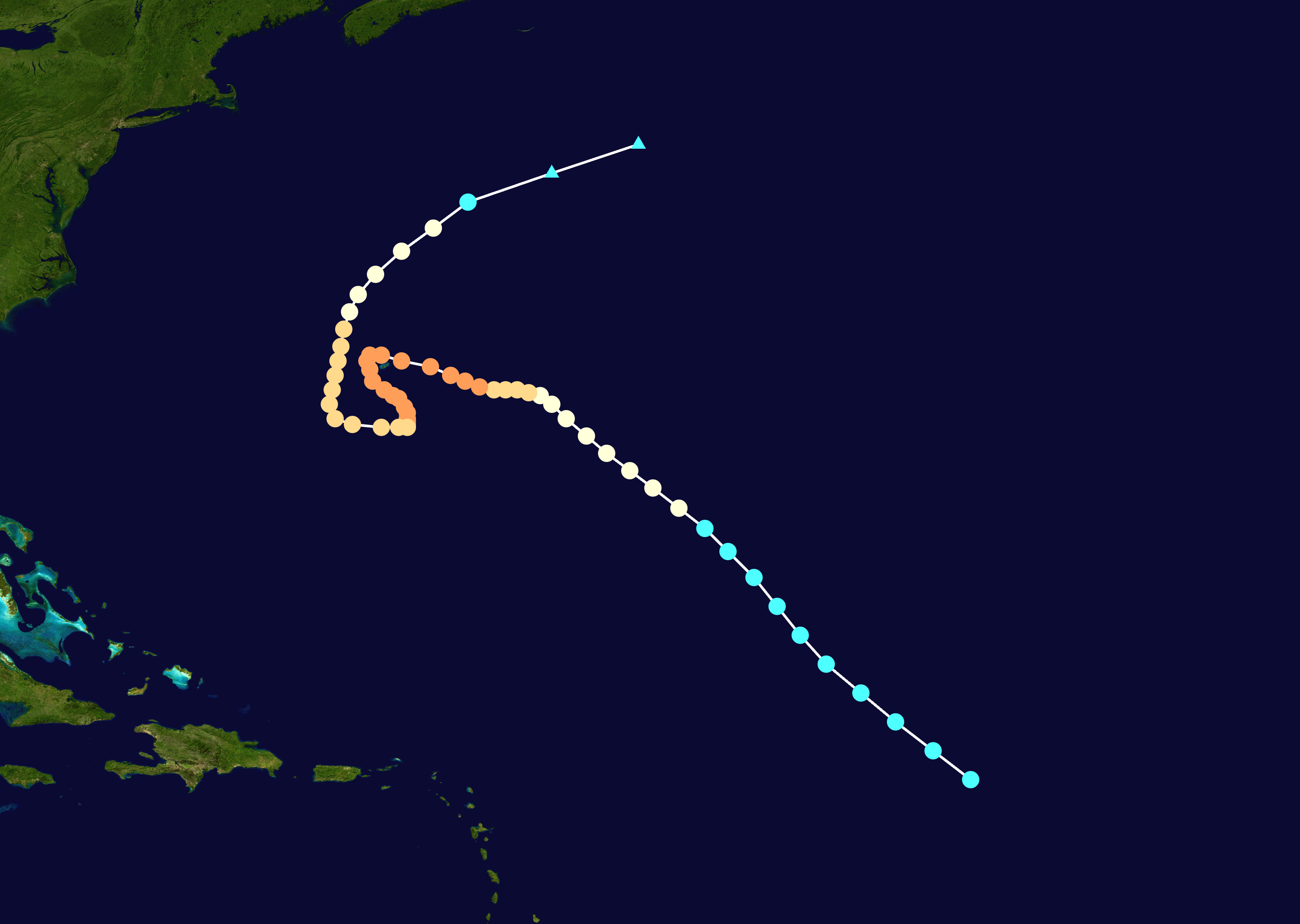
- Duration: August 27 – September 10
- Peak intensity: 120 mph (195 km/h) (1-min); 985 mbar (hPa)

Historical weather maps indicate that a trough became a tropical storm by August 27 about 1,115 mi (1,795 km) east-northeast of Guadeloupe. Moving northwestward and slowly strengthening, the storm became a hurricane early on August 30. After reaching Category 2 intensity at 00:00 UTC on September 1, the cyclone turned west-northwestward. About 24 hours later, the storm intensified into a Category 3 hurricane and soon peaked with winds of 120 mph (195 km/h) and a minimum pressure of 985 mbar (29.1 inHg). The hurricane then meandered slowly around Bermuda, passing just 25 mi (40 km) north of the island around 06:00 UTC September 3. Thereafter, the system turned southeastward and passed roughly the same distance west of Bermuda about 18 hours later. On September 6, the cyclone weakened to a Category 2 hurricane and curved to the west. Veering north-northeastward on September 7, the storm fell to Category 1 intensity about two days later. A northeastward motion commenced, and the system weakened to a tropical storm on September 10. The storm became extratropical several hours later while being absorbed by a frontal system about 345 mi (555 km) south of Sable Island.

Bermuda observed gale-force winds from nearly all directions, while sustained winds on the island peaked at nearly 96 mph (154 km/h). Many roofs leaked due to heavy rainfall, while several buildings were partially or completely deroofed, including the Commissioner's House and St. George Hotel. A cathedral also suffered substantial damage. High winds downed trees and disrupted electrical and telephone services on the island. Damage was extensive overall. Large waves generated by the hurricane wrecked many boats. One cargo ship, the SS Pollockshields, aground on at a reef off Elbow Beach. The captain drowned while attempting to procure a life jacket for a crew member, though the other men aboard were eventually rescued.

=== Hurricane Four ===
- Category 2 hurricane (SSHWS)
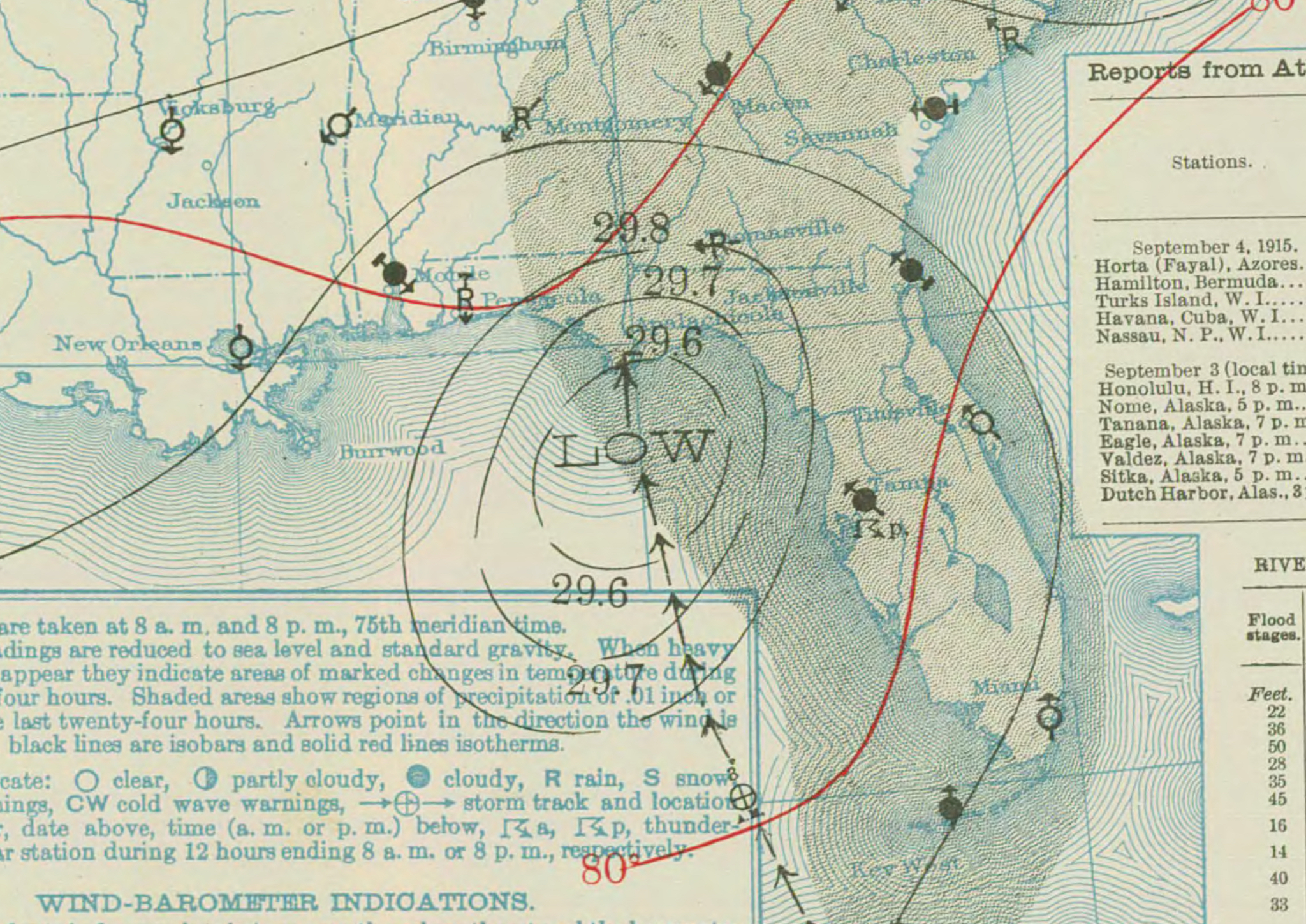
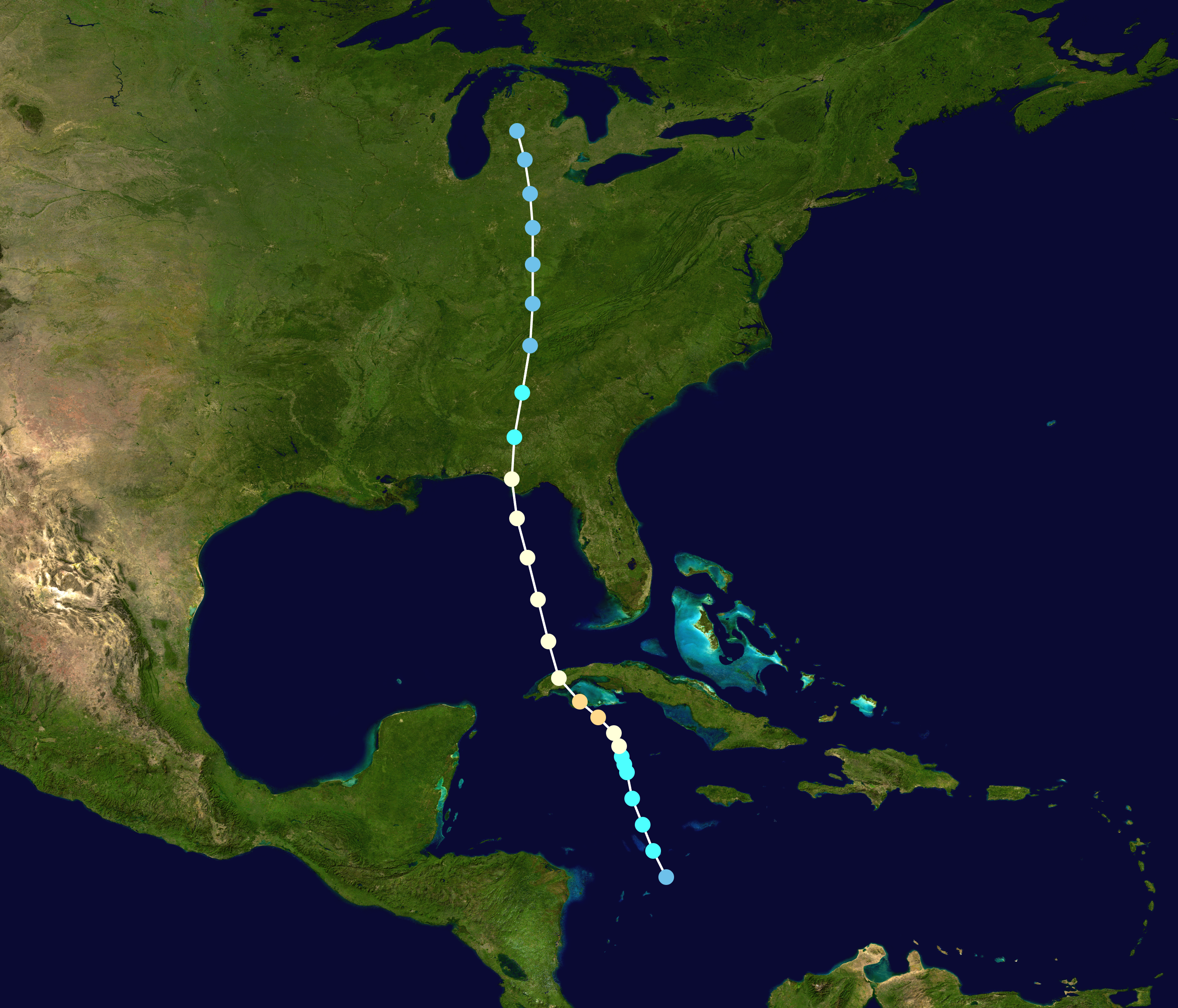
- Duration: August 31 – September 6
- Peak intensity: 100 mph (155 km/h) (1-min); 982 mbar (hPa)

A tropical depression developed over the western Caribbean about 240 mi (385 km) south-southwest of Negril, Jamaica, on August 31. The depression moved north-northwestward and quickly intensified into a tropical storm later that day. Early on September 2, the storm strengthened into a hurricane. Several hours later, the cyclone intensified into a Category 2 hurricane and peaked with maximum sustained winds of 100 mph (155 km/h). A brief jog to the northwest caused the storm to strike Isla de la Juventud and Pinar del Río Province, Cuba, at the same intensity early on September 3. The storm resumed its north-northwestward course and weakened to a Category 1 hurricane before emerging into the Gulf of Mexico. Around 11:00 UTC on September 4, the hurricane made landfall near Apalachicola, Florida, with winds of 90 mph (150 km/h). A barometric pressure of 982 mbar (29.0 inHg) was observed, the lowest known pressure in relation to the storm. The cyclone weakened to a tropical storm as it crossed southeastern Alabama later that day and deteriorated to tropical depression intensity over Tennessee early on September 5. The system persisted until dissipating over central Michigan late the next day.

In Cuba, the city of Havana observed wind gusts up to 64 mph (105 km/h). The crew of the schooner Roncador reported that at least eight vessels were wrecked along the Guanahacabibes Peninsula, including a hulk swept about 1 mi (1.6 km) inland. Storm surge and abnormally high tides in Florida caused damage as far south as Manatee County. Tides in St. Petersburg exceeded by the previous record height by nearly 5 ft (1.5 m). Nearby, the seawall at Pass-a-Grille suffered substantial damage. In the Florida Panhandle, Apalachicola recorded sustained wind speeds up to 70 mph (110 km/h), downing about half of electrical and telephone poles and wires, toppling hundreds of trees, unroofing several buildings, and destroying many small homes. Rough seas wrecked many boats and wharves. Damage in Apalachicola reached $100,000. Tides reached 7 ft (2.1 m) above normal at Carrabelle, washing away piers and grounding several barges and boats. The storm also toppled some chimneys, fences, and telephone poles. Strong winds in Marianna uprooted several trees and downed many large tree limbs. Overall, 21 deaths occurred in Florida, with several attributed to storm-related maritime incidents. The system also brought heavy rains and high winds to portions of Georgia, causing losses to cotton crops. A tornado in Marshallville caused property damage and four deaths.

=== Tropical Storm Five ===
- Tropical storm (SSHWS)
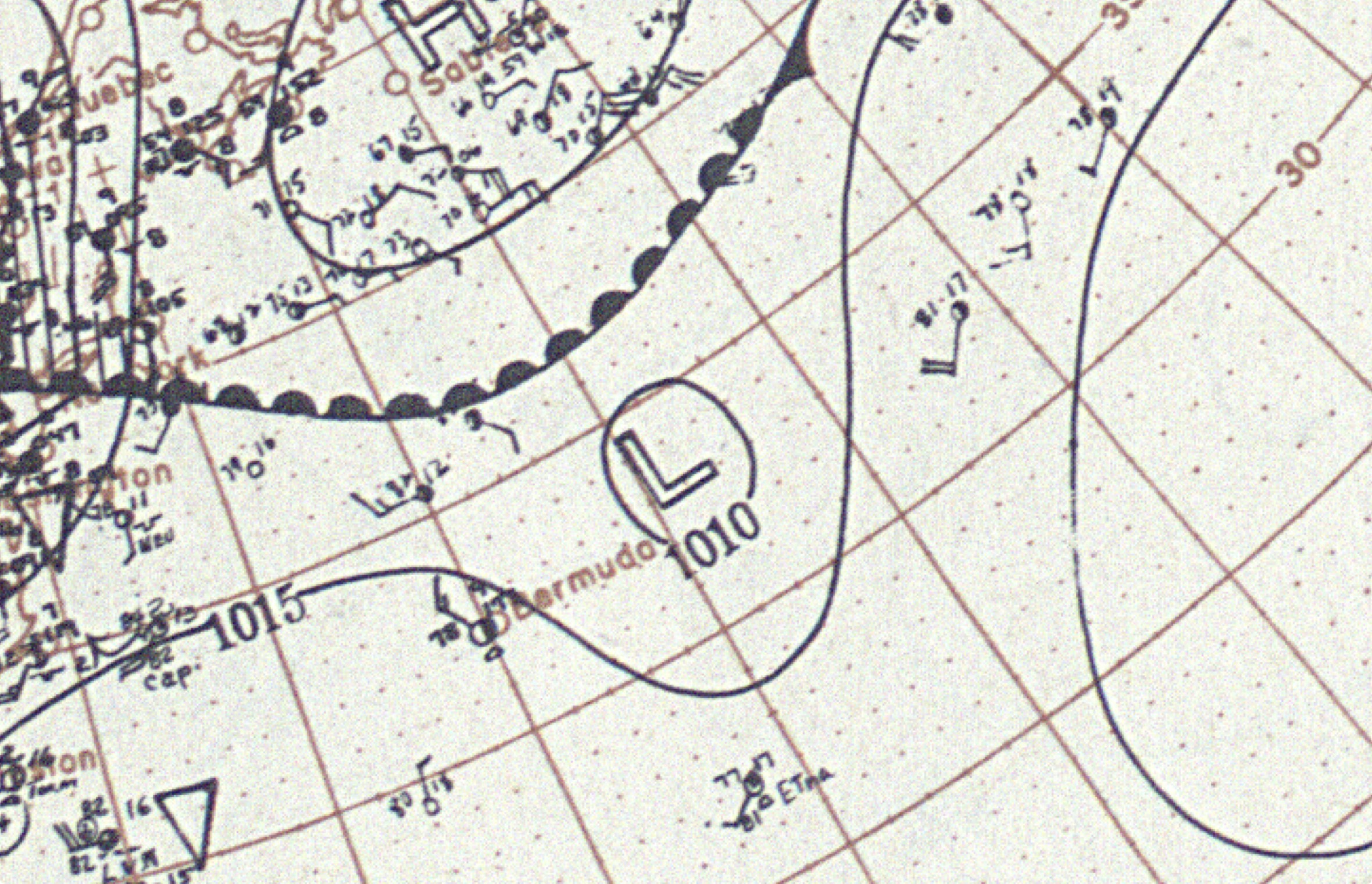
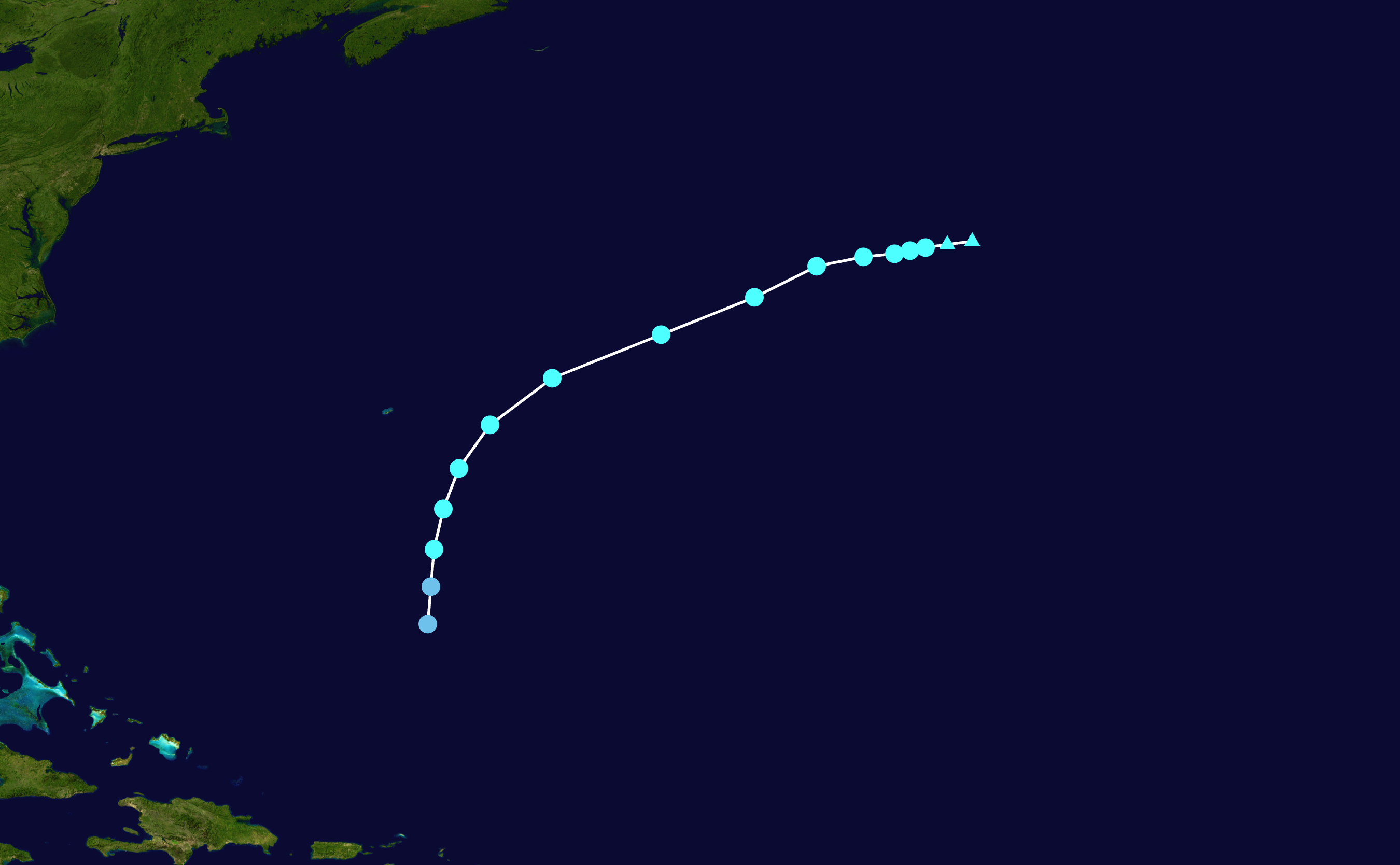
- Duration: September 19 – September 22
- Peak intensity: 60 mph (95 km/h) (1-min); <1005 mbar (hPa)

A surface trough developed into a tropical depression about 475 mi (765 km) south-southeast of Bermuda on September 19. The depression moved east-northeastward and intensified into a tropical storm early the next day. Later on September 20, the cyclone curved northeastward and accelerated. By September 22, however, the storm decelerated and peaked with maximum sustained winds of 60 mph (95 km/h). The system transitioned into an extratropical cyclone several hours later about 695 mi (1,120 km) southeast of Cape Race, Newfoundland. The extratropical remnant low was absorbed by a frontal boundary on September 23.

=== Hurricane Six ===
- Category 4 hurricane (SSHWS)
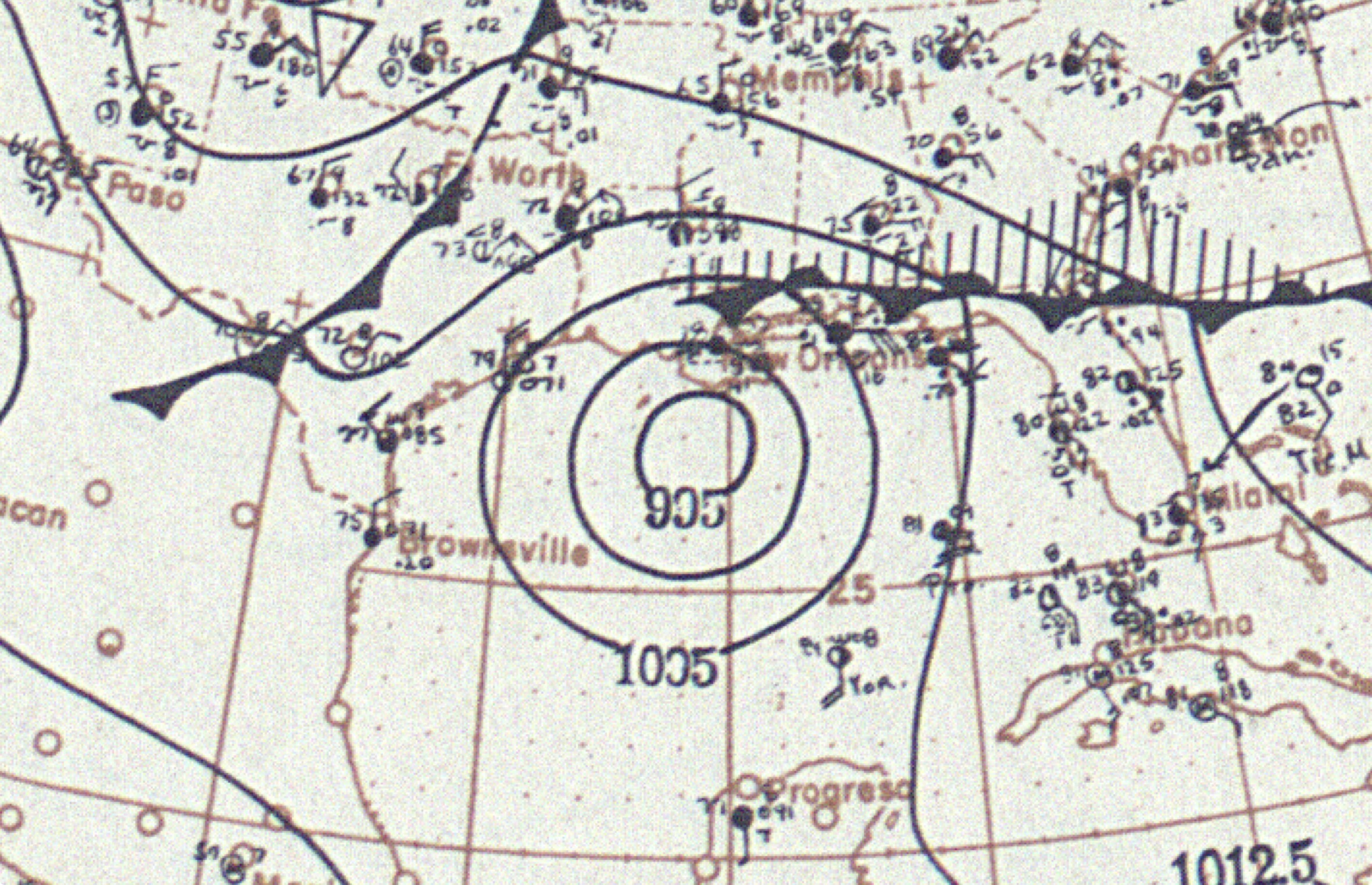
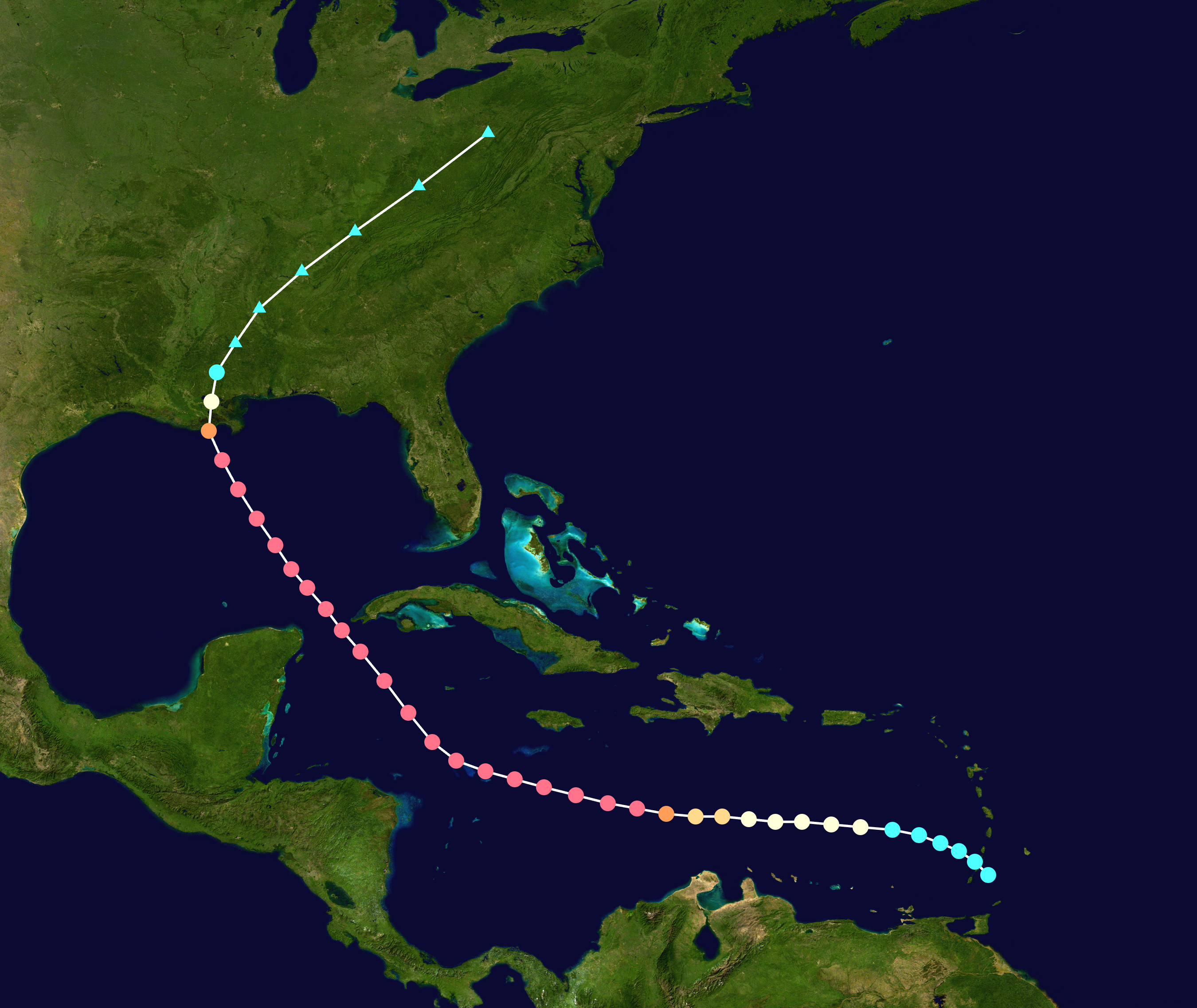
- Duration: September 21 – September 30
- Peak intensity: 145 mph (230 km/h) (1-min); 931 mbar (hPa)

A tropical storm was first observed about 45 mi (70 km) east-northeast of Grenada on September 21. The storm initially moved northwestward as it entered the Caribbean, before turning west-northwestward by late on the following day. Early on September 23, the cyclone intensified into a hurricane over the eastern Caribbean. Upon reaching the central Caribbean, the storm underwent rapid intensification between September 24 and September 25, and peaked as a Category 4 hurricane with maximum sustained winds of 145 mph (230 km/h) and a minimum barometric pressure of 931 mbar (27.5 inHg). The hurricane then curved northwestward early on the following day, shortly after passing Serranilla Bank. Late on September 27, the cyclone moved through the Yucatán Channel and entered the Gulf of Mexico. The storm weakened to a Category 3 hurricane just prior to making landfall near Port Fourchon, Louisiana, with winds of 125 mph (200 km/h) at 18:00 UTC on September 29. The cyclone rapidly weakened to a tropical storm over southern Mississippi early the next day, shortly before becoming extratropical. The extratropical remnants tracked northeastward until dissipating over southwestern Pennsylvania late on October 1.

In Antigua, winds generated by the storm downed some fences, while rough seas capsized a sailing boat and force shipping activity to be suspended. Strong gales in Jamaica resulted in a loss of communication between the capital city of Kingston and outlying districts. Ramón Pérez Suárez et al. of the Cuban Institute of Meteorology noted that the hurricane inflicted impacts consistent with a tropical storm in western Cuba. Sustained winds of 36 mph (60 km/h) was observed in Havana, well east of the storm's path. In Louisiana, storm surge along the southeast coast of the state was estimated to have crested between 15 and 20 ft (4.6–6.1 m) in height, while wind gusts reached as high as 130 mph (210 km/h) in New Orleans. Nearly all buildings in the city suffered some degree of damage, while several structures were destroyed. Approximately 25,000 homes were damaged. Approximately 90 percent of structures along Lake Pontchartrain and the Mississippi River south of New Orleans suffered impacts. Property damage in Louisiana was estimated at $13 million, with $5 million of that in the city of New Orleans. In Mississippi, coastal areas likely experienced hurricane-force winds. Abnormally high tides and strong winds caused significant damage to bridges, buildings, railroads, pecan crops, timber, and shipping. Some property damage was reported in Alabama, especially in Mobile. Four deaths also occurred in the city. Overall, the hurricane caused 279 fatalities throughout the United States.

=== Other systems ===
In addition to the six tropical cyclones reaching tropical storm intensity, four others remained a tropical depression. On April 29, a depression developed from a trough near southeastern Bahamas. The system moved quickly northeastward before being absorbed by an extratropical cyclone near Bermuda on May 2. Another tropical depression developed on September 17 from an open trough over the southeastern Gulf of Mexico. The depression moved west-northwestward and struck near the Mexico–Texas border late on September 20. The system dissipated on the following day. On October 6, a tropical depression formed well east of the Lesser Antilles. The depression moved northwestward and crossed the Leeward Islands between October 8 and October 9, bringing sustained winds up to 23 mph (37 km/h). By October 10, the cyclone dissipated north of Anguilla. Another tropical depression developed on October 20 to the south of Bermuda. The depression tracked northeastward, before turning northward by October 22. On the next day, an extratropical storm absorbed the depression well south of Newfoundland.

== See also ==
- 1900–1940 South Pacific cyclone seasons
- 1900–1950 South-West Indian Ocean cyclone seasons
- 1910s Australian region cyclone seasons
