= Dukach =

Dukach is a surname derived from the archaic Ukrainian nickname described as "wealthy man" in Ukrainian dictionaries. Notable people with the surname include

- Anton Dukach (born 1995), Ukrainian luger
- Inna Dukach, operatic soprano from The GrooveBarbers, American a cappella musical group
- Semyon Dukach (born 1968), American entrepreneur and blackjack player
