= Grand Slam of Golf =

Grand Slam of Golf may refer to:

- Grand Slam (golf), the accomplishment of winning all of golf's major championships in the same year
- PGA Grand Slam of Golf, an annual tournament 1979–2014 for the year's winners of the four major championships of regular men's golf
