= Port Royal Golf Course =

Golf course in Bermuda

Coordinates: 32.2609°N 64.8738°W

Port Royal Golf Club
- Interactive map of Port Royal Golf Club

Club information
- Location: Southampton, Bermuda
- Established: 1965 Founded; 1970 Opened; 2009 Renovated
- Type: Public
- Owner: Bermuda Government
- Operator: Bermuda Government
- Tota holes: 18
- Tournaments: PGA Grand Slam of Golf
- Website: Official website
- Designed by: Robert Trent Jones
- Par: 71
- Length: 6,842 yards (6,256 m)

Port Royal Golf Course is a golf club located in Southampton, Bermuda.

It has hosted the PGA Tour's Bermuda Championship since 2019.

== History ==
Located in the Southampton Parish, Southampton Golf Club, as the course was originally known, was founded in 1965 under the chairmanship of Reginald Tucker, with land being purchased in July 1965 after being given the go-ahead on 15 June 1965 from G.H. Taylor Director of Public Works. The plan however was potentially jeopardised because some of the area was originally farmland and one owner refused to sell his property to the course. Undaunted, construction finally got under way in earnest on 1 December 1967, and the project was renamed Port Royal Golf Course.

The course was the creation of golf course architect, Robert Trent Jones. Design had to be changed several times initially due to land agreements, however this rerouting lead to the creation of the world famous, and much photographed, spectacular 16th hole – the tee and green of which perch precariously on cliffs overlooking the Atlantic Ocean.

The course was finally completed and opened in 1970. More recently, it underwent renovation in preparation for the hosting of the 2009 PGA Grand Slam of Golf. A member of the original design team, Roger Rulewich, has headed up this $14.5 million project and the course was officially reopened on 21 July 2009.
