= Mixed Company of Yale =

American university a cappella group

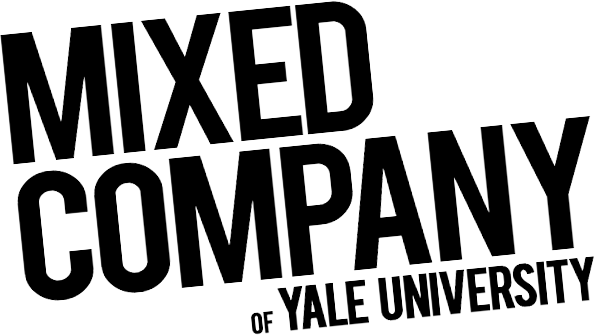

Background information
- Origin: Yale University, New Haven, CT
- Genres: A cappella
- Years active: 1981–present
- Website: mixedcompanyofyale.com

Mixed Company of Yale is an all-gender undergraduate a cappella group from Yale University. Founded in 1981, Mixed Company was originally formed as a group specializing in both sketch comedy and a cappella. Today, the group focuses primarily on singing, though the group often integrates skits and other comedy into performances. The group has toured on five continents and regularly performs for world leaders visiting Yale's campus. Mixed Company has released 18 studio albums, and their most recent recording, Third Degree, was released in summer 2021.

== History ==
In the fall of 1981, a small group of Yale undergraduates found themselves unable to decide between sketch comedy and a cappella, so they decided to form a new group that incorporated elements of both, thus forming the original tap class of Mixed Company. Since then, the group has recorded 17 studio albums and has toured around the country and the world.

== Membership ==
The members of Mixed Company are all selected for their singing talent as freshmen or sophomores through Yale's long and involved rush process, which takes place at the beginning of each fall semester. The rush process is governed by Yale's Singing Group Council.

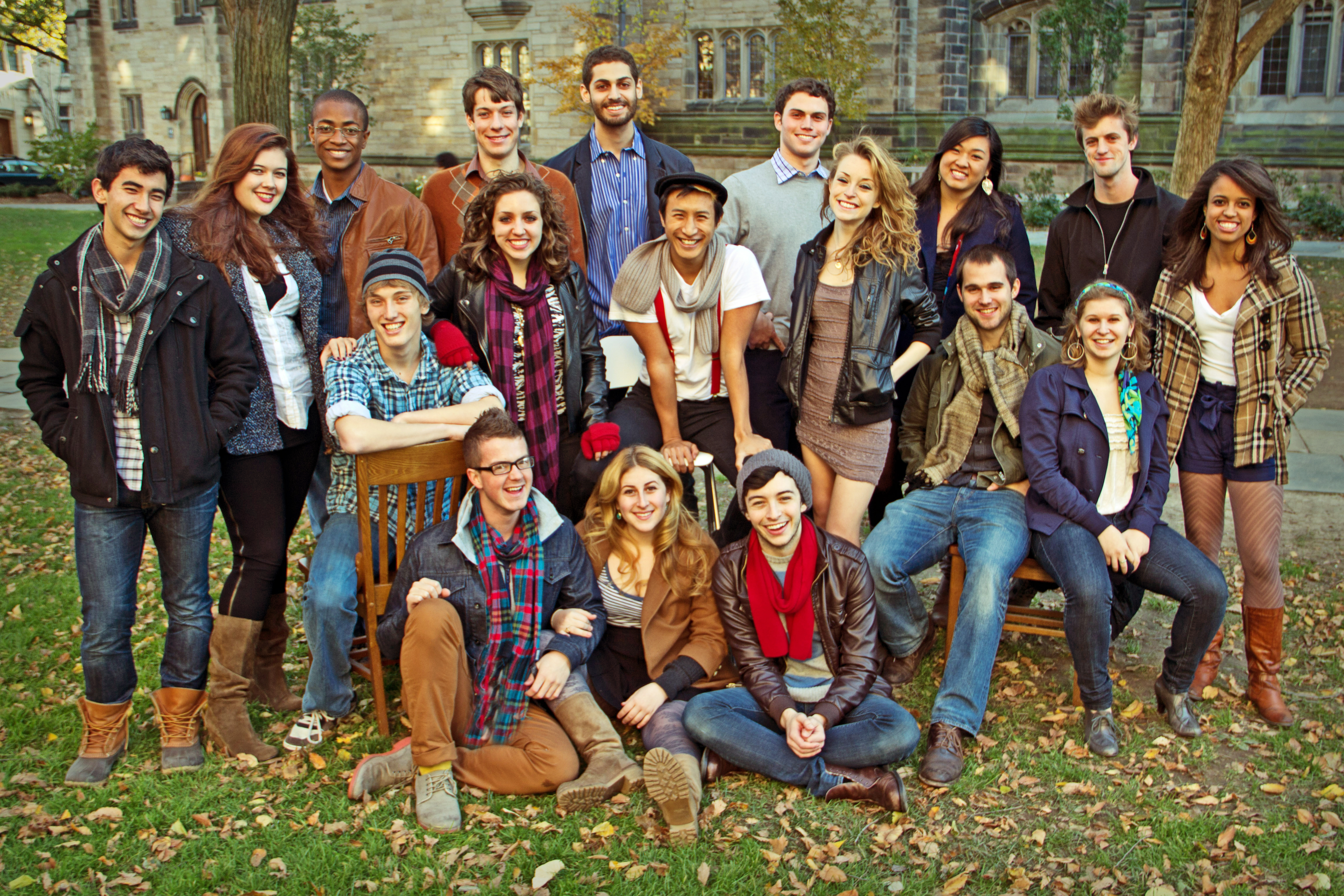
Mixed Company's touring members, 2011–2012

The first part of the rush process is Woolsey Jam, a concert at which each group performs two songs. This is followed by Dwight Hall Jam later in the week, directly after which rushees, mostly freshman undergraduates, sign up to audition. That weekend, a cappella groups watch these prospective members audition, and in the following few weeks the rushees meet the members of each group through a series of "rush meals," during which they eat with members of each group they have auditioned for. During these weeks, each group also holds a concert called a "Singing Dessert" in which rushees determine which group they like best musically. Afterwards, groups call back certain students to hear them a second time in order to finally decide whom to tap. Tap Night, an important Yale tradition, takes place during the next week at midnight on a day not known to rushees until announced by the Singing Group Council.

== Repertoire ==
Mixed Company is known for its diverse repertoire, which covers a wide range of musical styles, including but not limited to rock, pop, musical theater, jazz, and rhythm & blues. Each piece in the repertoire was arranged, written, or transcribed by a Mixed Company member, and includes songs originally performed by Marc Cohn, Ben Folds, and Aretha Franklin, among others. "Hodja", the group's traditional opening song, has been performed at nearly every concert since the group's founding. The group's alumni song, "Zombie Jamboree" (popularized by Rockapella), is performed at all major concerts. New songs are added to the group's active repertoire every year, which includes around 30 songs. Arrangements added since 2010 include songs performed by Sister Hazel, Marc Broussard, Beyoncé, Mika, Whitney Houston, Katy Perry, Alicia Keys, Rascal Flatts, and more. Mixed Company also sings original songs written and arranged by group members, such as "Prayer" (Esther Hyun '12), "How the Scenery Changes" (Brian Kim '04), and "Asking for a Friend" (Sofía Campoamor '19).

The group is also well known for its incorporation of original comedy routines, such as the popular "Hipster Mockumentary", into their concerts.

== Tours and performances ==
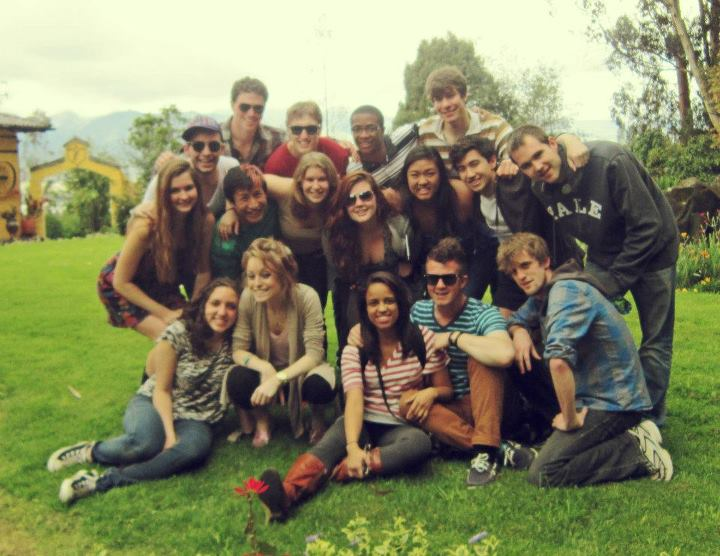
Mixed Company on tour in Ecuador in 2012.

Mixed Company tours extensively across the world and the United States. Every year, Mixed Company goes on 2–3 tours during winter, spring, and summer breaks, as well as many mini-tours throughout the school year.

Tours have taken the group to Morocco, Beijing, Colombia, Ecuador, Montreal, Brazil, Bermuda, Austin, California, Miami, and more. Mixed Company has performed for audiences on five different continents, including for the Education for Music Non-profit, UN Secretary-General Ban Ki-moon, and former prime minister Tony Blair. They have also performed at the Vatican, the Empire State Building, and even at Citi Field, where they performed "The Star-Spangled Banner" at a New York Mets game. Mixed Company has also been featured on Connecticut Channel 3 News, where they performed "White Christmas". In addition to performances, Mixed Company holds workshops where they work with younger a cappella groups.

The Contemporary A Cappella Society has reviewed Mixed Company performances, calling them "rousing," featuring songs that are "outstandingly arranged" and "so full and so gorgeous."

== Notable alumni ==
- Tanya Wexler '92, film director known for her 2011 comedy Hysteria.
- Bellamy Young '92, stage and film actress. Starred in The Life and Merrily We Roll Along on Broadway and currently plays Mellie Grant on the ABC show Scandal.
- Susan Dominus '92, staff writer for the New York Times Magazine and lecturer at Yale University.
- James-Allen Ford '93, writer of In Transit, a Broadway musical. In Transit was nominated for 5 Drama Desk awards, winning the 2011 award for Outstanding Ensemble Performance.
- Angela Warnick Buchdahl '94, first Asian-American to be ordained as a rabbi.
- Eric Braverman '97, former CEO of the Clinton Foundation and lecturer at the Yale School of Management.
- Ari Shapiro '00, host of All Things Considered on National Public Radio, frequent performer with Pink Martini.
- Ben Eakeley '00, performer in the Broadway and National Tour productions of Sweeney Todd as well as the Broadway productions of On a Clear Day You Can See Forever, She Loves Me, and Cabaret (musical).
- Maiya Sykes '00, contestant on season 7 of The Voice and a member of the musical collective Postmodern Jukebox.
- Amy Justman '00, performer in the Broadway productions of Company (musical), White Christmas (musical), The Phantom of the Opera (1986 musical), and A Gentleman's Guide to Love and Murder.
- Estelí Gomez '08, soprano in the Grammy Award-winning vocal ensemble Roomful of Teeth.
- Sofía Campoamor '20, singer-songwriter and the first woman to be admitted to The Whiffenpoofs.

== Discography ==
Mixed Company records a new album every other year. Since its founding, it has recorded 18 studio albums:

Album title	Year	Recording type
Where's the Stage?	1987	Vinyl Record
Doing Justice	1989	Cassette Tape
Vertical Hold	1991	Cassette Tape
Unplugged	1993	CD
Sleeping In The Kitchen	1995	CD
Flow Chart	1997	CD
Change of Plans	1999	CD
Molly Pitcher	2001	CD
Trespassing	2003	CD
Two Steps	2005	CD
Dashboard Buddha	2007	CD
The Purple Album	2009	CD
7/10 Split	2011	CD
Gumption	2013	CD
Jam Session	2015	CD
Tiny Room	2017	CD
Animal Flow	2019	CD
Third Degree	2021	CD

Mixed Company albums have been reviewed by the Recorded A Cappella Review Board.
