= There's a Meeting Here Tonight =

Hymnal

Song
- Genre: Hymnal, Traditional

There's a Meeting Here Tonight was a hymnal sung by enslaved Americans to alert other enslaved persons of planned meetings.

1 Get you ready, there’s a meeting here tonight,

Come along there’s a meeting here tonight,
I know you by your daily walk,
There’s a meeting here tonight.

2 Oh, hallelujah, to the lamb,
There’s a meeting here tonight,
For the Lord is on the given hand,
There’s a meeting here tonight.

3 If ever I reach the mountain top,
I'll praise my Lord and never stop,
Get you ready, there’s a meeting here tonight.

4 Go down to the river when you're dry
And there you'll get your full supply,
Get ready, there’s a meeting here tonight.

5 You may hinder me here,
But you cannot there,
God sits in heaven
And he answers prayer.

There’s a meeting here tonight.
