= Furness Bermuda Line hotels =

Furness Bermuda Line new service to Bermuda in the 1920s created the need of additional modern accommodations for the tourists coming to the island after the first World War. This lead for Furness Withy, parent company of the line, to begin buying existing hotels and purchasing land for this new demand. This led to the formation of the Bermuda Development Company which would Furness' new business development. Eventually the company would manage four main properties: The St George, The Mid Ocean Club, Bermudiana, and the Castle Harbor Hotel. The hotels would continue to see increased business and benefit from legislation passed that would prevent ships from being used as hotels in 1938. Furness Withy would eventually sell all its ownership in the hotels by 1958.

== The St. George ==
The St. George Hotel, built in 1906, with 100 rooms, was located in the town of St George. Furness purchased the hotel and would eventually renovate and enlarge it, and build a new golf course. The hotel also had a beach club at Achilles Bay, which is now managed by its successor, the St. Georges Club. The St. George also became known for having one of the largest indoor swimming pools in Bermuda. The hotel also had a ship shaped bar building called the Sea Venture at the top of the hotel's rose walk. The hotel was torn down, and today the property consists of the St. George Club while the golf course land still exists and in the process of being restored.

== The Mid Ocean Club ==
Mid Ocean Club original hotel building

The Mid-Ocean Club was opened in what is now Tucker's Town on March 3, 1922, by Governor Sir James Willcocks. A 18-hole golf course in Tucker's Town, Bermuda. Designed by Charles Blair Macdonald in 1921, it was modified to its current design in 1953 by Robert Trent Jones. The hotel would be used for several Western Big Three Conferences that would include dignitaries such as Winston Churchill. The original hotel building would be torn down in the 1970s, but the golf course remains.

== The Bermudiana ==
Steamer "John S. Darrell", originally HMS Balaena (and the sister ship of the Bermudian (HMS Arctic Whale), passes Barr's Bay and the Bermudiana Hotel.

The Bermudiana hotel was constructed through 1923 and opened on January 28, 1924.It had 248 rooms located on Hamilton Harbor. The hotel would close in 1939 after the start of World War II, opening again in 1941 to house members of the Imperial Censorship.

In 1951 after a complete renovation, the hotel became Bermuda's first apartment hotel, offering accommodation to both visitors and permanent residents who could lease the apartments. The renovation also involved the construction of the new Bermudiana Theatre, designed by architect C. Howard Crane, and able to seat up to 445 people. The theater would offer “21-weeks’ season of continuous plays” would be offered and that the new theatre within the Bermudiana Hotel would allow performances to be viewed in an “atmosphere of luxury and comfort on a par with any metropolitan theatre.”

The hotel would change ownership in 1955, and would later burn down in 1958. A new 237-room hotel, also named Bermudiana, was opened in 1960 on the existing property, until it was demolished in the 1990s.

== The Castle Harbour Hotel ==
The Castle Harbor Hotel, located on Castle Harbour opened in 1931. All the materials for constructing the hotel were pre-cast in England and brought to Bermuda by Furness ships. The hotel closed in 1984 for renovations and expansion, and re-opened as the Marriott Castle Harbour Hotel in 1986. The originally built Castle Harbor Hotel would closed in 1999 for a complete rebuilding. The original hotel building was eventually gutted to the structural steel 'skeleton', and rebuilt. The hotel reopened as the Rosewood Bermuda, which is remains today with some recognizable elements of the original property, including the iconic elevator tower, built to bring guests up from the shoreline.

== Hotel Tenders ==
Furness Bermuda Line would purchase and construct tender boats to ferry passenger from their ships to their hotel properties. This was due to the long duration by land it would take to transport passengers from the ship piers. Furness would first purchase the former British Admiralty vessel HMS Arctic Whale in 1923 and rename it the Bermudian. In 1929, the company would custom build a tender Mid-Ocean, which would later be renamed the Castle Harbour, when the Castle Harbor Hotel finally opened.

	Ship Name	Year Completed	Shipyard	Years in Service for Hotels	Status	Notes
Furness tenders Bermudian and Castle Harbour with Royal Navy tugs Sandboy and Creole fight the MS Bermuda fire, 17 June 1931	Bermudian	1915	Admiralty whaler, Adty No 878. Smiths Dock Company, South Bank, UK	1923-1947	Scrapped 1958	Built as H.M.S. Arctic Whale, purchased by Furness in 1923 for service to St. George Hotel
	Castle Harbour (originally Mid-Ocean)	1929	Blythswood Shipbuilding Co. Ltd, Glasgow, Scotland	1929-1939	Torpedoed & sunk during WWII off Tobago1942	Purpose-built for Furness Bermuda Line for service to St George Hotel & Mid Ocean Club, and later Castle Harbour Hotel
