= The Toughest =

Compilation album by Peter Tosh
- Released: October 10, 1988
- Recorded: 1978–1987
- Genre: Reggae
- Label: Capitol/Parlophone/EMI
- Producer: Peter Tosh, Marlene Tosh, Michael C. Collins, Chris Kimsey, Robert Shakespeare

The Toughest is also the title of another Peter Tosh album, released by Heartbeat Records in 1996.

The Toughest is a compilation album by reggae artist Peter Tosh.

AllMusic noted about it, "What's lacking, however, are any of Tosh's more militant songs, the ones that defined his reputation back home in Jamaica."

== Track listing ==
1. "Coming In Hot"
2. "Don't Look Back"
3. "Pick Myself Up"
4. "Crystal Ball"
5. "Mystic man"
6. "Reggaemylitis"
7. "Bush Doctor"
8. "Maga Dog"
9. "Johnny B. Goode"
10. "Equal Rights" / "Downpresser Man"
11. "In My Song"
