= PGA Grand Slam of Golf =

Golf tournament

Coordinates: 32.261°N 64.874°W

Tournament information
- Location: Southampton, Bermuda
- Established: 1979
- Course(s): Port Royal Golf Course
- Par: 71
- Length: 6,821 yards (6,237 m)
- Organized by: PGA of America
- Tour(s): PGA Tour (unofficial event)
- Format: Stroke play - 36 holes
- Prize fund: $1.35 million
- Month played: October
- Final year: 2014

Final champion
- (Germany) Martin Kaymer

Location in the north Atlantic Ocean

The PGA Grand Slam of Golf was an annual off-season golf tournament contested from 1979 until 2014 when the tournament was cancelled. It was contested by the year's winners of the four major championships of regular men's golf, which are the Masters Tournament, the U.S. Open, The Open Championship (British Open), and the PGA Championship. It was one of several invitational events for leading male golfers held each year after the PGA Tour and the European Tour seasons had concluded. The competition was organized by the PGA of America and the prize money did not count toward the PGA Tour money list.

The tournament was staged since 1979 with a couple of short breaks. Beginning in 1991, it was played as a two-day, 36-hole stroke play competition, except in 1998 and 1999, when it was played at match play. From 1979 to 1990, it was played as a one-day, 18-hole stroke play competition. If a player won more than one major in a calendar year or a player declined the invitation to play, the PGA of America filled the four-man field by inviting the former major winner(s) with the best overall finishes in that year's majors.

Initially the PGA Grand Slam of Golf was played at a different golf course each year, but from 1994 to 2006, it was played at the Poipu Bay Golf Course in Koloa, Hawaii on the island of Kauaʻi. The tournament in Hawaii allowed the event to be televised in prime-time American television with live coverage because of the time difference.

In 2007, the tournament moved to the Mid Ocean Club in Bermuda and it was played in mid-October, reflecting the earlier end to the main part of the PGA Tour season after the introduction of the FedEx Cup. In 2009, the event stayed in Bermuda but moved to the Port Royal Golf Course.

The final prize fund was $1.35 million, of which $600,000 went to the winner. This was the lowest first prize some of the competitors had played for all year, but on the other hand there was a guaranteed $200,000 for coming in last. From 1991 to 2005, the prize fund was $1 million, of which $400,000 went to the winner. In 2006, the purse was $1.25 million, with $500,000 going to the winner.

In the 2004 tournament at Poipu Bay Golf Course, Phil Mickelson shot a 59 in the second round.

The 1986–90 tournaments were played at Kemper Lakes Golf Club in Hawthorn Woods, Illinois, site of the PGA Championship in 1989.

The event was to be moved to Trump National Golf Club in Rancho Palos Verdes, California for the 2015 contest, but on July 7, 2015 the PGA announced that the 2015 event will not be played at the course due to outcry over comments that course owner Donald Trump made about Latino immigrants. After being unable to find a suitable replacement venue, the 2015 event was canceled.

In March 2016, the event was discontinued altogether after the PGA of America concluded it no longer fit in "today's golf landscape."

== World Series of Golf ==
The year's four major champions in a 36-hole event was previously applied at the original "World Series of Golf," played from 1962 through 1975 at the South Course of Firestone Country Club in Akron, Ohio. Held in early September, Jack Nicklaus won four of the fourteen events, including the first two, and was runner-up in six. All editions had a winner's share of $50,000, a substantial prize in its early years, significantly more than a major. The event changed to a limited field PGA Tour event in 1976 and continues as the WGC-Bridgestone Invitational.

== Courses ==
Years	Venue	Location
2009–2014	Port Royal Golf Course	Southampton, Bermuda
2007–2008	Mid Ocean Club	Tucker's Town, Bermuda
1994–2006	Poipu Bay Golf Course	Koloa, Hawaii
1992–1993	PGA West Nicklaus Resort Course	La Quinta, California
1991	Kauaʻi Lagoons Resort	Kauaʻi, Hawaii
1986–1990	Kemper Lakes Golf Club	Kildeer, Illinois
1982	PGA National Golf Club	Palm Beach Gardens, Florida
1981	Breakers West Golf Course	West Palm Beach, Florida
1980	Hazeltine National Golf Club	Chaska, Minnesota
1979	Oak Hill Country Club	Rochester, New York

== Results ==
Year	Winner	Runner(s)-up	Third	Fourth
2014	(Germany) Martin Kaymer (U.S. Open)	(United States) Bubba Watson (Masters)	(Northern Ireland) Rory McIlroy (Open, PGA)	(United States) Jim Furyk (a)
2013	(Australia) Adam Scott (Masters)	(England) Justin Rose (U.S. Open)	(United States) Jason Dufner (PGA)	(Republic of Ireland) Pádraig Harrington (a)
2012	(Republic of Ireland) Pádraig Harrington (a)	(United States) Webb Simpson (U.S. Open)	(T3) (United States) Keegan Bradley (a) & (United States) Bubba Watson (Masters)	
2011	(United States) Keegan Bradley (PGA)	(South Africa) Charl Schwartzel (Masters)	(Northern Ireland) Rory McIlroy (U.S. Open)	(Northern Ireland) Darren Clarke (Open)
2010	(South Africa) Ernie Els (a) (2)	(United States) David Toms (a)	(T3) (Germany) Martin Kaymer (PGA) & (Northern Ireland) Graeme McDowell (U.S. Open)	
2009	(United States) Lucas Glover (U.S. Open)	(Argentina) Ángel Cabrera (Masters)	(United States) Stewart Cink (Open)	(South Korea) Yang Yong-eun (PGA)
2008	(United States) Jim Furyk (a) (2)	(Republic of Ireland) Pádraig Harrington (Open, PGA)	(South Africa) Retief Goosen (a)	(South Africa) Trevor Immelman (Masters)
2007	(Argentina) Ángel Cabrera (U.S. Open)	(Republic of Ireland) Pádraig Harrington (Open)	(United States) Jim Furyk (a)	(United States) Zach Johnson (Masters)
2006	(United States) Tiger Woods (Open, PGA) (7)	(United States) Jim Furyk (a)	(Australia) Geoff Ogilvy (U.S. Open)	(Canada) Mike Weir (a)
2005	(United States) Tiger Woods (Masters, Open) (6)	(United States) Phil Mickelson (PGA)	(New Zealand) Michael Campbell (U.S. Open)	(Fiji) Vijay Singh (a)
2004	(United States) Phil Mickelson (Masters)	(Fiji) Vijay Singh (PGA)	(South Africa) Retief Goosen (U.S. Open)	(United States) Todd Hamilton (Open)
2003	(United States) Jim Furyk (U.S. Open)	(Canada) Mike Weir (Masters)	(United States) Shaun Micheel (PGA)	(United States) Ben Curtis (Open)
2002	(United States) Tiger Woods (Masters, U.S. Open) (5)	(T2) (United States) Justin Leonard (a) & (United States) Davis Love III (a)		(United States) Rich Beem (PGA)
2001	(United States) Tiger Woods (Masters) (4)	(United States) David Toms (PGA)	(South Africa) Retief Goosen (U.S. Open)	(United States) David Duval (Open)
2000	(United States) Tiger Woods (U.S. Open, Open, PGA) (3)	(Fiji) Vijay Singh (Masters)	(United States) Tom Lehman (a)	(United States) Paul Azinger (a)
1999	(United States) Tiger Woods (PGA) (2)	(United States) Davis Love III (a)	(Spain) José María Olazábal (Masters)	(Scotland) Paul Lawrie (Open)
1998	(United States) Tiger Woods (a)	(Fiji) Vijay Singh (PGA)	(United States) Lee Janzen (U.S. Open)	(United States) Mark O'Meara (Masters, Open)
1997	(South Africa) Ernie Els (U.S. Open)	(United States) Tiger Woods (Masters)	(United States) Davis Love III (PGA)	(United States) Justin Leonard (Open)
1996	(United States) Tom Lehman (Open)	(United States) Steve Jones (U.S. Open)	(England) Nick Faldo (Masters)	(United States) Mark Brooks (PGA)
1995	(United States) Ben Crenshaw (Masters)	(T2) (Australia) Steve Elkington (PGA) & (United States) Corey Pavin (U.S. Open)		(United States) John Daly (Open)
1994	(Australia) Greg Norman (a) (3)	(Zimbabwe) Nick Price (Open, PGA)	(South Africa) Ernie Els (U.S. Open)	(Spain) José María Olazábal (Masters)
1993	(Australia) Greg Norman (Open) (2)	(United States) Paul Azinger (PGA)	(T3) (United States) Lee Janzen (U.S. Open) & (Germany) Bernhard Langer (Masters)	
1992	(Zimbabwe) Nick Price (PGA)	(United States) Tom Kite (U.S. Open)	(United States) Fred Couples (Masters)	(England) Nick Faldo (Open)
1991	(Wales) Ian Woosnam (Masters)	(Australia) Ian Baker-Finch (Open)	(United States) Payne Stewart (U.S. Open)	(United States) John Daly (PGA)
1990	(United States) Andy North (a) (2)	(United States) Craig Stadler (a)	(United States) Payne Stewart (PGA)	(United States) Mike Ditka (b)
1989	(United States) Curtis Strange (U.S. Open)	(United States) Craig Stadler (a)	(Australia) Ian Baker-Finch (a)	(Australia) Greg Norman (a)
1988	(United States) Larry Nelson (PGA)	(T2) (United States) Larry Mize (Masters) & (United States) Scott Simpson (U.S. Open)		(Australia) Greg Norman (a)
1987	No tournament			
1986	(Australia) Greg Norman (Open)	(United States) Fuzzy Zoeller (a)	(T3) (United States) Jack Nicklaus (Masters) & (United States) Bob Tway (PGA)	
1983–85	No tournament			
1982	(United States) Bill Rogers (Open)	(Australia) David Graham (U.S. Open)	(United States) Larry Nelson (PGA)	(United States) Tom Watson (Masters)
1981	(United States) Lee Trevino (a)	(United States) Tom Watson (Open)	(United States) Jack Nicklaus (U.S. Open)	(Spain) Seve Ballesteros (Masters)
1980	(United States) Lanny Wadkins (a)	(United States) Hale Irwin (U.S. Open)	(T3) (Australia) David Graham (PGA) & (United States) Fuzzy Zoeller (Masters)	
1979	(T1) (South Africa) Gary Player (Masters) & (United States) Andy North (U.S. Open)		(T3) (United States) John Mahaffey (PGA) & (United States) Jack Nicklaus (Open)	

Note: a=alternate
b=Mike Ditka replaced Curtis Strange due to illness.

== Multiple winners ==
Five golfers have won the event more than once:

- Tiger Woods – 7 wins: 1998, 1999, 2000, 2001, 2002, 2005, 2006
- Greg Norman – 3 wins: 1986, 1993, 1994
- Andy North – 2 wins: 1979, 1990
- Jim Furyk – 2 wins: 2003, 2008
- Ernie Els – 2 wins: 1997, 2010
