= The St. George Hotel (Bermuda) =

Hotel

- Interactive map of the The St. George Hotel area

General information
- Status: Demolished
- Location: St. Georges, Bermuda, 6 Rose Hill St George, GE02
- Coordinates: 32°22′51.84″N 64°40′50.28″W
- Opened: 1906

The St. George Hotel, was a hotel built in 1906 in the historic town of St. George's, Bermuda. The hotel would have multiple owners through the years, including the Furness Bermuda Line and be one of their many properties on the island. The hotel was torn down in the 1970s and replaced by the St. George Club.

== Design & History ==
The hotel was constructed on Rose Hill overlooking the town of St. George and was opened in 1906. It had over 100 rooms and served as a winter tourist destination featuring "extensive grounds, private baths, luxurious furnishings, sun parlors, spacious verandas, large ballroom, orchestra, tennis and golf" Next to the hotel was the bar the "Sea Venture" built in the shape of a ship. The hotel was renovated and expanded over the years, including a new wing, and one of the largest indoor swimming pools in Bermuda. The hotel had a golf course and a beach club at Achilles Bay. The hotel was purchased by the Furness Bermuda Line in 1920, to coordinate with their ships bringing tourists to the island. Since the ships docked in Hamilton, passengers wishing to stay at the hotel were brought by to the hotel by the Furness tender the Bermudian and later Castle Harbor.

The hotel would be a popular winter holiday destination for many U.S. visitors, including F. Scott Fitzgerald and his wife Zelda.

The Sea Venture Bar

Rose Walk

=== The St. Georges Club ===
The hotel would eventually be demolished and replaced with the current St. Georges Club, combination time share and hotel complex, that sits on the same site. Relics of the old hotel property include the golf course, beach club, and rose-walk, all part of the current hotels property. The St. Georges Club closed in 2020 and would later be purchased by the St Regis Hotel group which refurbished and reopened the resort in May 2022.

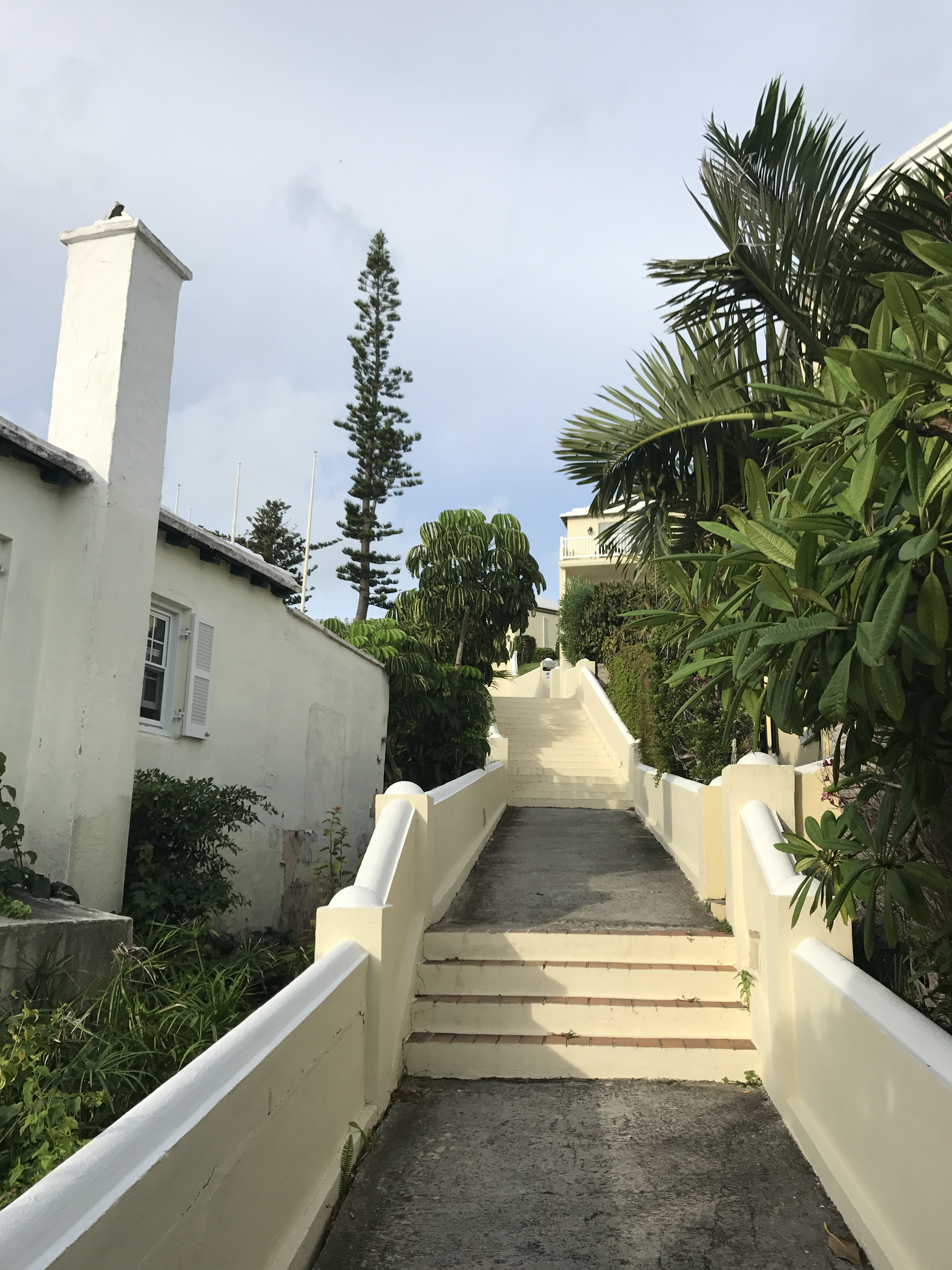
The historic rose walk today, built for The St. George Hotel leading up to the current St. George Club
