= Mid Ocean Club =

Golf course in Tucker's Town, Bermuda

Coordinates: 32.3311°N 64.6940°W

Mid Ocean Club original hotel building

The Mid Ocean Club is a private 6,520 yard, 18-hole golf course in Tucker's Town, Bermuda. Designed by Charles Blair Macdonald in 1921, and originally built in collaboration with the Furness Bermuda Line (part of Furness Withy).

After the First World War, Bermuda's tourism industry went through considerable change as Prohibition led to a flood of affluent middle class visitors seeking sun and alcohol, and Bermuda became a summer rather than a winter destination. The large urban hotels were replaced by resorts sandwiched between private beaches and golf courses, such as the South Shore Hotel, now called the Elbow Beach Hotel (which had been completed immediately before the war, in 1913). The Mid Ocean Club had been developed in connection with the construction by Furness Withy (in partnership with the Bermuda Development Company) of the neighbouring Castle Harbour Hotel, built near Paynter's Vale in Tucker's Town and completed in 1931. The development of the hotel and club had required the forced removal of the existing population of Tucker's Town. The Castle Harbour Hotel was one of three Furness Bermuda Line hotels in Bermuda (the other two being the St. George's Hotel and the Bermudiana) as the company sought to gain both the passengers carried to and from Bermuda and guests at Bermuda's hotels.

During the Second World War, Tucker's Town (an area with a long military history, as indicated by the name of the harbour) was garrisoned as the site of the Cable and Wireless transatlantic telegraph cable hut and the Castle Harbour Hotel was used by the United States Army to accommodate personnel during the construction of Kindley Field on the other side of the harbour. Following the war, the Mid Ocean Club struggled financially, and in 1951 it was sold to its members. Golf course architect Robert Trent Jones was hired to redesign the course in 1953, which he modified to its current design though he made few changes to MacDonald's design.

It is consistently placed highly among world courses and is ranked 45th by Golf Digest for courses outside the United States. The Mid Ocean Club hosted its second PGA Grand Slam of Golf in October 2008. Previously, the tournament had its home at Poipu Bay Golf Course in Hawaii.

The Mid Ocean Club has hosted George H. W. Bush, Winston Churchill, Dwight Eisenhower, and the Duke of Windsor. Some of the more well-known holes include the par-3 "Redan" 17th hole, the par-4 18th hole, as well as the signature par-4 5th.

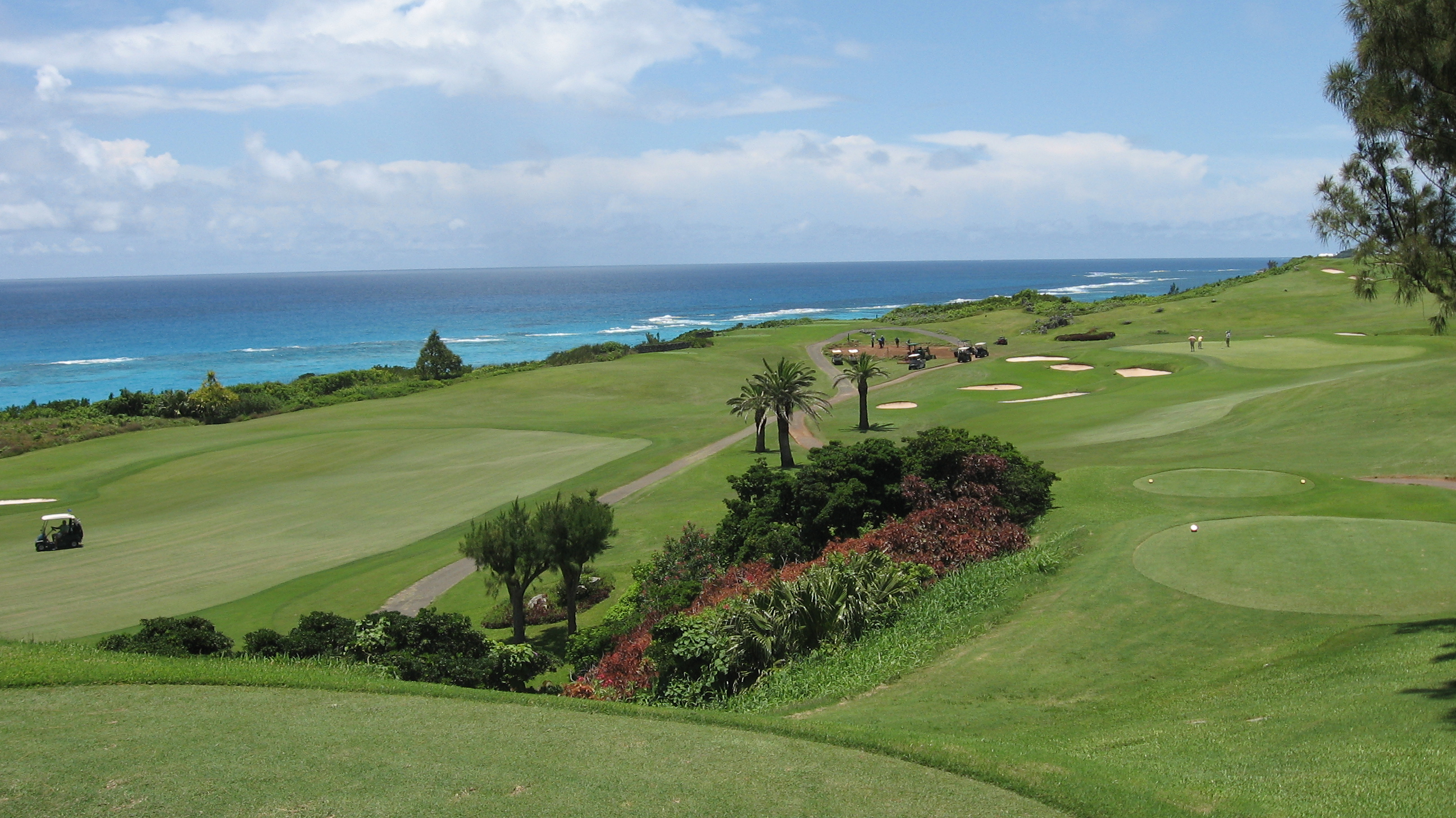
View of the 17th hole and the 18th tee to its left

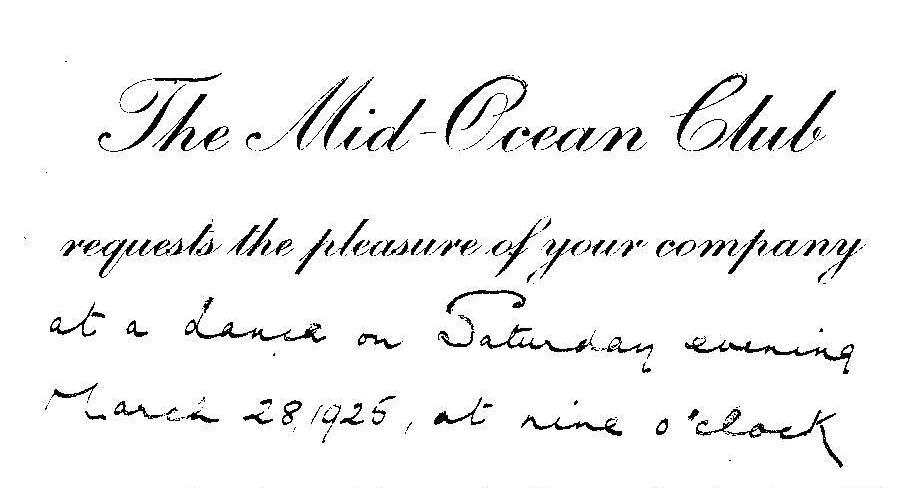
1925 invitation to a dance

Ian Fleming mentions the club in his James Bond short story Quantum of Solace, describing the course as a "fine links where all the quality play and get together at the club afterwards for gossip and drinks".
