= Lord Intruder =

Trinidad and Tobago musician

Lord Intruder (born Winston O'Conner) was a calypsonian from Tobago who was active in the 1950s.

He is known to have performed with the Trinidadian calypso tent group The Original Young Brigade (OYB), whose ranks included The Mighty Sparrow, Lord Melody and The Mighty Bomber.

He is credited with originating one of the most famous calypso standards, "Jumbie Jamberie", variously recorded as "Zombie Jamboree" and "Back to Back." He performed "Jumbie Jamboree" at the Old Brigade Calypso Tent in Port of Spain, Trinidad, in 1953.

== Partial discography ==
- "Annual Walking Race," b/w "Is by Animal Motor Car was Invented" (c. 1953)
- "Disaster with the Police," b/w "Jumbie Jamberie" (1953)
- "Good Friday Happenings," b/w "Ah Can't Bear the Torture" (1954)
- "Ashe's Experience in a Walking Race," b/w "Some People Does Get to Resemble They Work" (1954)
- "Advantage in Room Renting" (with OYB, 1955)
- "Destruction of Hurricane Janet", b/w "Doctor Shop Scandal" (1956)
