= The GrooveBarbers =

American a cappella group

- Origin: New York City
- Genres: A cappella
- Years active: 1997–present
- Members: Sean Altman; Inna Dukach; Kevin Weist; Steve Keyes; Charlie Evett; Johnny Ryan
- Past members: Ed Chung; Graham Brown
- Website: groovebarbers.com

The GrooveBarbers are an American a cappella musical group formed in 1997 in New York City. The band consists of Sean Altman, Steve Keyes, Charlie Evett, Kevin Weist, and Johnny Ryan, the first three of whom are former members of Rockapella. Inna Dukach, Altman's wife, also appears as a regular operatic soprano. Also, another former Rockapella member Elliott Kerman, has made guest performances on some occasions.

== Personnel ==
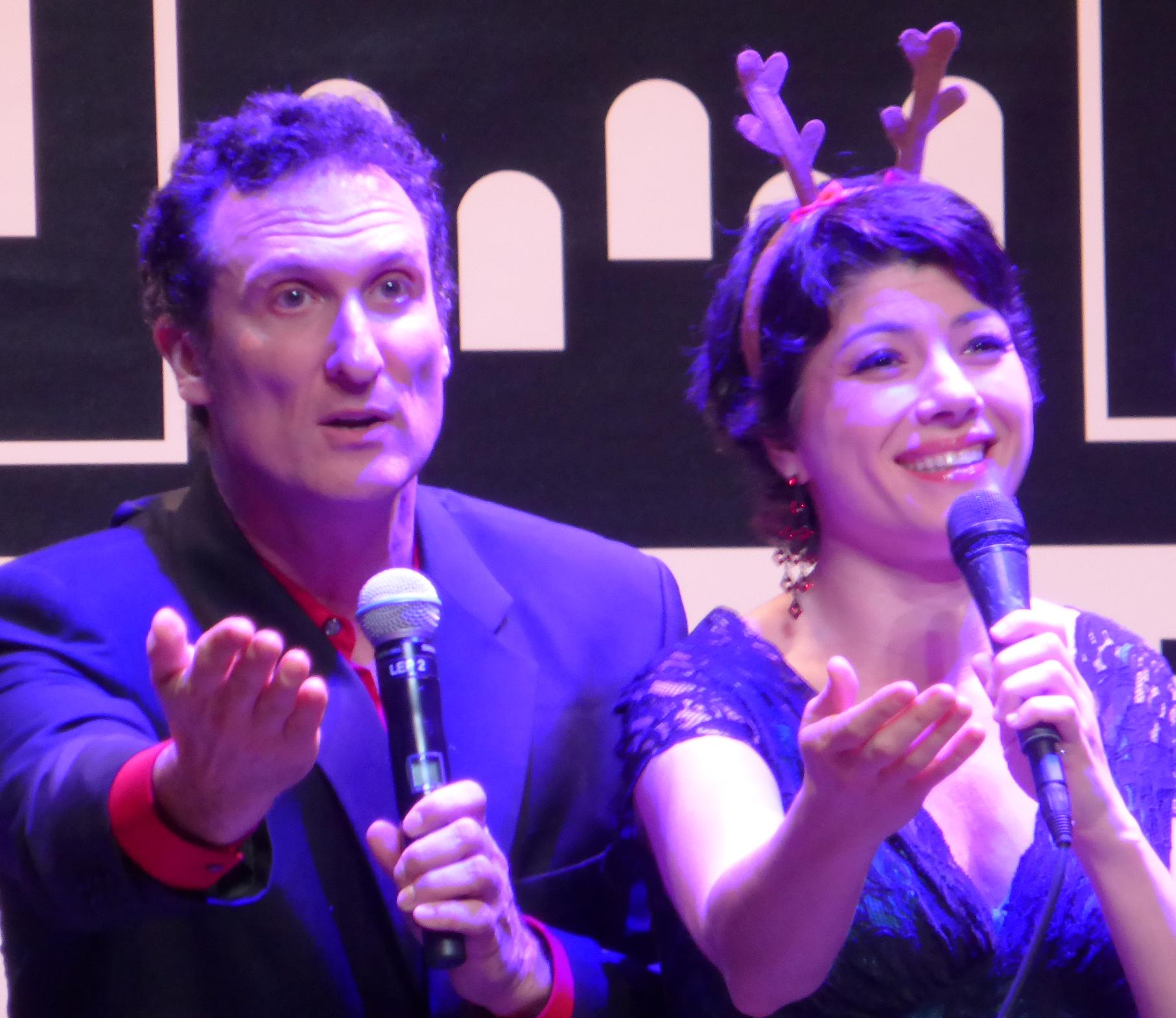
Altman and Dukach, December 2015, BAMCafé, Brooklyn Academy of Music

Current members

- Sean Altman – lead singer
- Kevin Weist – baritone
- Steve Keyes – high tenor
- Charlie Evett – bass
- Johnny Ryan – vocal percussion

Supporting members

- Inna Dukach – operatic soprano
- Elliott Kerman - guest baritone

Former members

- Ed Chung – vocal percussion
- Graham Brown – vocal percussion

== Discography ==
- 2005: Glory
- 2010: Guts
- 2014: Warning: Barbershop!
- 2016: Zombie Jamboree

== Filmography ==
- In 2006 and 2007, the GrooveBarbers appeared in two commercials for Astelin. They were dubbed "The Astelins".
- The GrooveBarbers were all contestants on the game show Eastern Expedition.
- The GrooveBarbers also made an appearance on Full Frontal with Samantha Bee in 2017.
