= HMS Sumar =

History

United Kingdom
- Name: HMS Sumar
- Namesake: Susan Marshall (wife of David Charles Whitney)
- Builder: Tebo Yacht Basin, subsidiary of Todd Shipyards Corporation, Brooklyn New York City, New York, US
- Launched: 1926
- Christened: Sumar
- Completed: 1926
- Commissioned: July 1942
- Decommissioned: 1946
- Home port: Royal Naval Dockyard, Bermuda
- Identification: FY1003
- Fate: Returned to civil use

General characteristics
- Type: Armed yacht
- Displacement: 319 tons
- Length: 48.768 m (160 ft 0 in)
- Beam: 7.9428 m (26 ft 1 in)
- Propulsion: Two 420 hp (310 kW) Cooper-Bessemer diesel engines
- Speed: 13 knots (24 km/h; 15 mph)
- Armament: Depth charge throwers

HMS Sumar (FY1003) was a yacht purchased by the Admiralty of the United Kingdom during the Second World War converted to an armed yacht and equipped for anti-submarine warfare, replacing HMS Castle Harbour (which had been re-assigned to the Mediterranean in 1942) as the Royal Naval Examination Service vessel at Bermuda. She was based at the Royal Naval Dockyard, Bermuda until the end of the war.

== Pre-war civil use ==
The Sumar was completed in 1926 by the Tebo Yacht Basin subsidiary of Todd Shipyards Corporation of New York for real estate developer David Charles Whitney of Grosse Point, Detroit, Michigan, United States (the son of lumber baron David Whitney Jr.), who named the motor yacht for his wife Susan Marshall Whitney.

== Royal Naval use in Second World War ==
Sumar was obtained by the British Admiralty, armed and commissioned as HMS Sumar in July 1942. Her first commanding officer, Temporary Lieutenant-Commander C. A. King, DSC, Royal Navy Reserve, was appointed on 12 July 1941. Armed for anti-submarine warfare, she was assigned to the Royal Naval Examination Service on the America and West Indies Station, based at the Royal Naval Dockyard, Bermuda. HMS Castle Harbour, a Bermudian tender which had been similarly commissioned, and which had been used by the Royal Naval Examination Service at Bermuda since the start of the war, was transferred to the Mediterranean, but sunk on transit on 16 October 1942 by the German submarine U-160. Although the Examination Service was responsible for anti-submarine duties inside Bermuda's barrier reef, the ocean outside the reef was normally patrolled by HMS Evadne. Evadne was also responsible for escorting merchant vessels to Bermuda where they formed into convoys to cross the Atlantic (convoys formed at Bermuda were coded BHX and merged at sea with convoys from Halifax, Nova Scotia, coded HX, as the relatively smaller circumference of a larger circle meant it took fewer escorts to defend one large convoy than two smaller).

On 2 June 1942, Sumar (by then under the command of Lieutenant Gordon Emerson Kernohan, Royal Canadian Naval Voluntary Reserve) departed Bermuda with the United States Naval Operating Base Bermuda (the United States having been granted naval and air base leases in Bermuda by the British Government in 1939 and 1940) tender USS Gannet (which had also been built by Todd Shipyards Corporation), under the command of Lieutenant Commander Frances Edward Nuessle, US Navy, in response to a distress call from the British merchant ship SS Westmoreland, which had been torpedoed by the German submarine U-566 220 nautical miles (410 km; 250 mi) northward of Bermuda. The rescue attempt was unnecessary as the sixty-five survivors from the crew of the Westmoreland had already been rescued by the merchant ship SS Cathcart and the former USS Henry R. Mallory. Sumar was limited to 10 knots (19 km/h; 12 mph), forcing Gannet to lower her speed. The two vessels were unable to communicate with each other by radio (Sumar's radio and compass being inoperable), and Gannet lacked sonar. Both kept their running lights on in order to maintain visual contact, at the cost of exposing themselves to German submarines. Aircraft from Bermuda flew ahead of them to search the area where the Westmoreland had been torpedoed. Finding no trace of the ship or survivors, the two ships were ordered to return to Bermuda at 1300 hours on 6 June. At 0022 Hours on the 7 June (GMT +1 hour, the German time used by the Kriegsmarine; or 1922 Hours on the 6 June Atlantic Time (GMT -4 hours)), the two ships were spotted by the German submarine U-653 under Kapitänleutnant Gerhard Feiler, who fired four homing torpedoes at them at 2320 hours (Atlantic Time). The shallow draughts of the two vessels caused all four to miss, but Feiler launched another two set for a shallower depth at 0242 hours on 7 June (Atlantic Time), causing a catastrophic explosion on Gannet. Although Feiler recorded that Sumar then turned towards his submarine, and that distress signals were visible to him for ten minutes, the crew of Sumar failed to see what had befallen Gannet or the distress signals and returned to Bermuda alone. Gannet went down rapidly, taking 16 of her crew with her. Her commanding officer and other survivors tied together life rafts with wounded and clung to the sides in the heavy seas. Twenty-two men would be rescued by two planes of VP-74 which made daring landings in the heavy seas. USS Hamilton, led to the scene by one of the same planes, rescued 40 others. What appeared to be the abandonment of Gannet by Sumar was to result in a rift between Royal Naval and US Naval personnel in Bermuda. On 4 July 1942, command of Sumar passed to Lieutenant Algernon Hugh Peniston, Royal Navy Reserve (one of many Bermudian officers and ratings serving in the Royal Navy).

Sumar was moved to the West Indies by the Royal Navy when no longer required at Bermuda, but with the end of the Second World War, she was returned to the Royal Naval Dockyard in Bermuda, decommissioned and disposed of by sale in 1946. The dockyard rebuilt her for passenger service (reportedly to operate between Alexandria in Egypt and Marseille in France), and her new Greek owners (whose agent in Bermuda was William E. Meyer and Company Ltd; the ship having been placed on the civil register in Panama) renamed her Horizonte Azul. She departed Bermuda on the 3 August 1946, with a delivery crew composed of a mix of British (Bermudian) and Polish nationals under Greek Captain Stratis Goulandria taking her to Gibraltar, where she arrived twenty-one days later.

From Gibraltar, she continued on to Alexandria.
