= USS Gannet (AM-41) =

Minesweeper of the United States Navy

Coordinates: 35°50′N 65°38′W

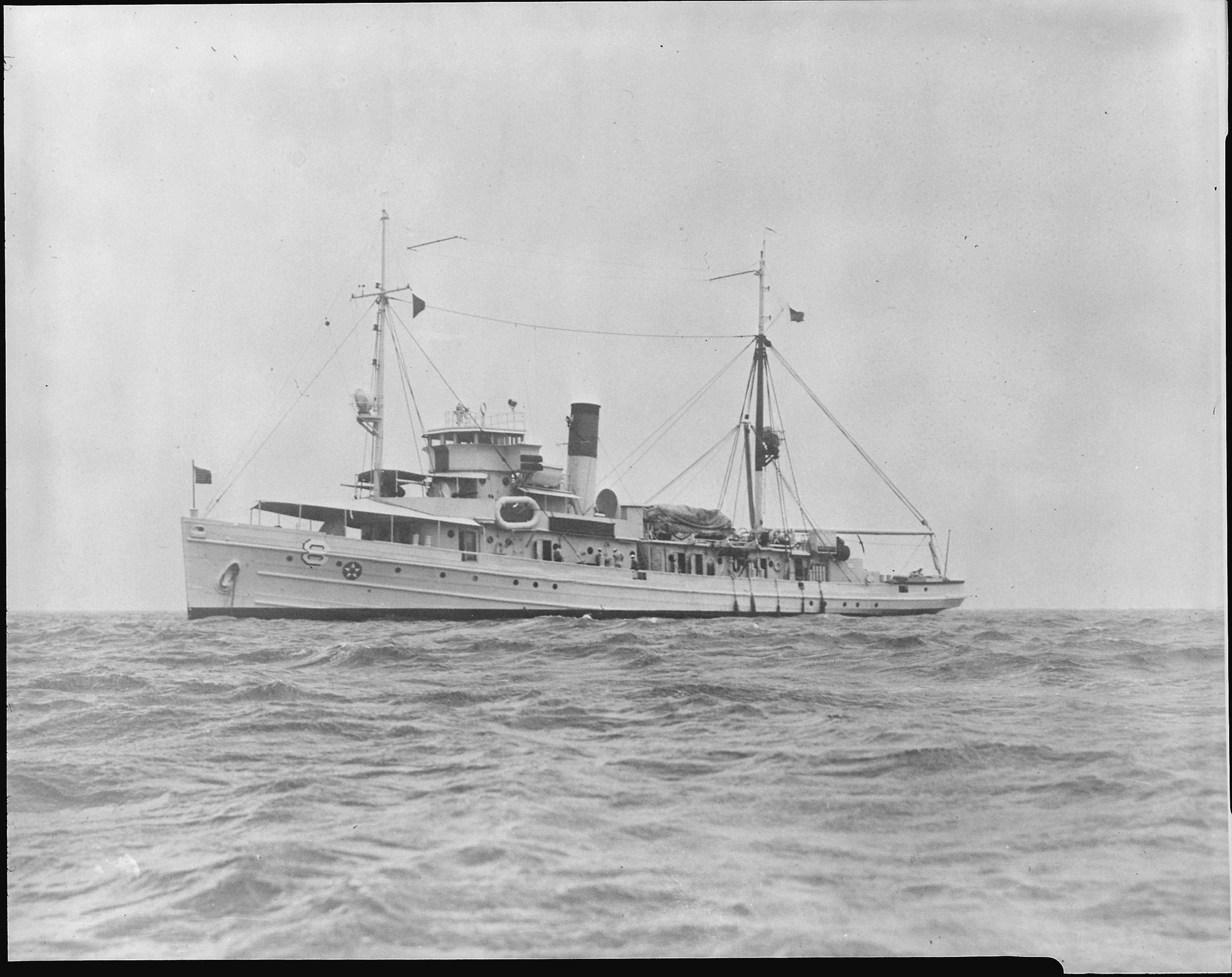
- Gannet in 1937

History

United States
- Name: USS Gannet (AM-41)
- Namesake: the gannet bird
- Builder: Todd Shipyard Corp.; New York
- Laid down: 1 October 1918
- Launched: 19 March 1919
- Sponsored by: Edna Mae Fry
- Commissioned: 10 July 1919
- Reclassified: Small Seaplane Tender AVP-8, 22 January 1936
- Fate: Sunk 7 June 1942

General characteristics
- Class & type: Lapwing-class minesweeper
- Displacement: 950 tons
- Length: 187 ft 10 in (57.25 m)
- Beam: 35 ft 6 in (10.82 m)
- Draft: 9 ft 10 in (3.00 m)
- Propulsion: One 1,400 shp Harlan & Hollingsworth Corp. Vertical triple expansion steam engine, one shaft.
- Speed: 14 knots (26 km/h)
- Complement: 72
- Armament: 2 machine guns

USS Gannet (AM-41) was an Lapwing-class minesweeper built for the United States Navy near the end of World War I.

Gannet was laid down 1 October 1918 by the Todd Shipyard Corp., New York; launched 19 March 1919; sponsored by Miss Edna Mae Fry; and commissioned at the New York Navy Yard 10 July 1919.

== Post-World War I operations ==
Gannet departed New York 11 August 1919 and reached San Diego, California, 2 November after training out of Guantanamo Bay, Cuba. A unit of the Train, Pacific Fleet, she based at San Diego and was subsequently assigned to Aircraft Squadron, Battle Fleet, and later to Base Force, U.S. Fleet. Serving primarily as a tender to aircraft squadrons, she also performed towing, transport, and passenger service along the western seaboard, and made periodic cruises as tender to aircraft units participating in Army-Navy exercises, fleet problems, and maneuvers off Hawaii, the Panama Canal, and in the Caribbean Sea.

She spent the summer months of 1926, 1929, and 1932-35 as tender to aerial survey expeditions to Alaska and the Aleutian Islands. On 30 April 1931 Gannet was designated a minesweeper for duty with aircraft. She was reclassified AVP-8, 22 January 1936.

== U.S. East Coast operations ==
Gannet departed San Diego, California, 18 August 1937 and based at Coco Solo, Panama, as tender for aircraft squadrons of the Scouting Force until 1 June 1939. Arriving Norfolk, Virginia, 9 June, she then became tender to Patrol Wing 5, Aircraft Scouting Force. In a series of cruises from Norfolk, she tended Navy patrol planes based at Key West, Florida, Bermuda, Santa Lucia, and Trinidad; then steamed north 22 September 1941 to establish an advance seaplane base at Kungnait Bay, Greenland (6 October – 23 October). She served on plane guard station in the Davis Strait for an Iceland-Argentia ferry flight before returning to Norfolk 11 November.

== World War II Atlantic Theatre operations ==
Gannet was tending patrol planes on the Great Sound, in the British colony of Bermuda, where the US Navy had begun operating Kingfisher anti-submarine patrol flights from the existing Royal Air Force flying boat air station on Darrell's Island pending the completion of its own US Naval Operating Base (containing a flying boat air station), when the Japanese struck Pearl Harbor. She returned to Norfolk, Virginia, 12 December and sailed 21 January 1942 for Bermuda again to serve as tender to Patrol Squadron 74 (VP-74), which provided air patrol and coverage in approaches to that base (Bermuda had long served as the headquarters, main base and dockyard of the America and West Indies Station of the Royal Navy, and was a forming-up location of trans-Atlantic convoys in both world wars; with convoys formed there during the Second World War coded BHX and merging with convoys formed at Halifax coded HX before crossing the Atlantic as fewer escorts were required for one large convoy than for two small ones). Gannet also was communication center for all aircraft operations in that area.

== Torpedoed by German submarine ==
Departing Bermuda 2 June, Gannet joined British ship HMS Sumar from the Royal Naval Dockyard Bermuda the next day in an unsuccessful search for the torpedoed merchantman SS Westmoreland, while aircraft from Bermuda flew ahead to search for Westmoreland. The search was unnecessary and in vain as Westmoreland had sunk and her sixty-five surviving crew members had already been rescued by the merchant ship SS Cathcart and the former USS Henry R. Mallory. Ordered back to base the afternoon of 6 June, the two warships (which were not in radio contact due to a malfunctioning wireless aboard Sumar) became separated during the night. At 0242 hours Atlantic Time (GMT -4 hours) on 7 June, northwest of Bermuda, Gannet was hit by submarine torpedoes from U-653. She went down so rapidly that her decks were awash within 4 minutes, and she carried 16 of her crew down with her. Unaware of what had befallen Gannet, Sumar returned to Bermuda alone. Twenty-two of Gannet's crew were rescued by two planes of VP-74 which made the daring landing in heavy seas. USS Hamilton, led to the scene by one of the same planes, rescued 40 others.

Gannet was removed from the Navy List, but the date is not known.
