= Kojak (2005 TV series) =

2005 American TV series

- Genre: Crime drama
- Based on: Kojak by Abby Mann
- Developed by: Anthony Piccirillo
- Starring: Ving Rhames; Chazz Palminteri; Roselyn Sánchez; Chuck Shamata; Sybil Temtchine; Michael Kelly
- Composer: Mark Snow
- Country of origin: United States
- Original language: English
- No. of seasons: 1
- No. of episodes: 9

Production
- Executive producer: Tom Thayer
- Production companies: Traveler's Rest Films; NBC Universal Television Studio

Original release
- Network: USA Network
- Release: March 25 – May 22, 2005

Kojak is an American crime drama television series starring Ving Rhames. It is a remake of Kojak starring Telly Savalas. The series lasted for one season, airing on USA Network from March 25 to May 22, 2005.

== Premise ==
Rhames portrays Lieutenant Theo Kojak of the New York City Police Department, a skilled plain clothes detective with a shaved head and an affinity for jazz, fine clothing, and lollipops. As in the original Kojak, he is fond of the catchphrase "Who loves ya, baby?"

== Cast ==
- Ving Rhames as Lieutenant Theo Kojak
- Chazz Palminteri as Captain Frank McNeil
- Michael Kelly as Detective Bobby Crocker
- Chuck Shamata as Detective Henry Messina
- Roselyn Sánchez as ADA Carmen Simone
- Sybil Temtchine as Detective Emily Patterson

== Episodes ==
No.	Title	Directed by	Written by	Original release date
1	"Pilot"	Eric Bross & Michael Watkins	Tony Piccirillo	March 25, 2005
A serial killer, who targets prostitutes with children, is leaving children without any legal guardians all over town. When Kojak sees those children, he gets angry and makes the hunt to a personal issue. Note: Two-hour television pilot episode.
2	"All That Glitters"	Eric Bross	Walter Klenhard	April 3, 2005
A robbery in a jewelry store escalates and ends with two people taken hostage and one dead. Kojak trades himself for the hostages, only to find out that there's another crime behind this robbery. Kojak tries to help the robber to save his loved ones.
3	"East Sixties"	Colin Bucksey	Alyson Feltes	April 10, 2005
A rich land developer is murdered in one of his buildings, leaving his adopted daughter back with her aunt. Kojak finds out that the biological mother just was released from prison. Shortly after that, the child is taken hostage in her school.
4	"Fathers and Sons"	Norberto Barba	Larry Brothers	April 17, 2005
An armed robbery escalates and the father of a ten-year-old boy gets shot. Kojak remembers the similar death of his own father and starts to work on the old case again. Meanwhile, ADA Stone gets beaten up by a murderer who wants his case closed. Kojak is forced to split his team up to solve all three cases at once.
5	"Hitman"	Michael Robison	David Black	April 24, 2005
A sniper kills for fun and not for the money, which leads Kojak and his team to similar cases in other cities. Kojak can land a breakthrough in the case when he gets information from a prisoner he once put away, but the price for the information would be high.
6	"Kind of Blue"	Jerry Levine	Natalie Chaidez	May 1, 2005
Kojak faces his own past again when he runs into a young student who is thinking of rejoining his old gang to solve his financial problems. Kojak tries to stop the planned robbery and arrest the violent gang leader.
7	"Music of the Night"	Jerry Levine	Steve Feke	May 8, 2005
A jazz singer is being stalked, and Kojak thinks that the stalker is also the bomber who’s keeping him and his team busy. After the club where she performs is blown up as well, Kojak thinks it’s another employee, but soon finds that he made a terrible mistake.
8	"All Bets Off: Part 1"	Colin Bucksey	Tony Piccirillo	May 15, 2005
During the investigation of his latest murder case, Kojak finds out that the dead man had an affair with Captain McNeill's wife. Things heat up when Kojak finds McNeill's fingerprints at the crime scene.
9	"All Bets Off: Part 2"	Michael Watkins	Tony Piccirillo	May 22, 2005
The ongoing investigation of Kate McNeill's murdered lover shows that the case has outstanding similarities to several old cases. Is McNeill a serial killer, or is the reason for this murder something completely different?

== Broadcast ==
It aired on the USA Network in the United States. In the United Kingdom, the series aired on ITV4.
