= Lisa Roberts Gillan =

American actress and producer (born 1965)

- Born: Lisa Roberts; 1965 (age 60–61); Decatur, Georgia, U.S.
- Occupations: Actress; producer
- Years active: 1995–present
- Relatives: Eric Roberts (brother); Julia Roberts (sister); Emma Roberts (niece)

Lisa Roberts Gillan (née Roberts; born 1965) is an American actress and producer.

== Biography ==
Lisa Roberts was born in Decatur, Georgia, the middle child of Walter Grady Roberts and Betty Lou Bredemus. Her brother, Eric Roberts, and sister, Julia Roberts, are both actors. She also had a half-sister, Nancy Motes, who died in 2014. After graduating from high school, she moved to New York City to attend theater school.

She runs the production company Red Om Films with her sister and Marisa Yeres Gill. Her niece is actress Emma Roberts.

== Filmography ==
=== As actress ===
==== Film ====
Year	Title	Role	Ref.
1995	Ten Benny	Linda	
1995	The Journey of August King	Meg	
1999	Runaway Bride	Elaine from Manhattan	
2002	Maid in Manhattan	Cora	
2003	Mona Lisa Smile	Miss Albini	
2004	Raising Helen	Zoo reporter	
2010	Valentine's Day	Young nurse	
2010	Eat Pray Love	Woman in play	
2016	Mother's Day	Assistant Betty	

==== Television ====
Year	Title	Role	Notes	Ref.
1996	Friends	Cathy	Episode: "The One After the Superbowl, Part Two"	
1999	Law & Order	Madelyn Bishop	Episode: "Tabula Rasa"	
2001	100 Centre Street	Mrs. Gayley	Episode: "No Good Deed Goes Unpunished"	
2001	Law & Order: Special Victims Unit	Mrs. Simmons	Episode: "Countdown"	
2003	Queens Supreme	Alona	Episode: "Words That Wound"	

=== As producer ===
==== Film ====
Year	Title	Notes	Ref.
1995	Ten Benny	Executive producer	
2008	Kit Kittredge: An American Girl	Producer	
2011	Jesus Henry Christ	Producer	
2022	Ticket to Paradise	Executive producer	
2023	Leave the World Behind	Producer	
2027	Panic Carefully	Producer	
TBA	Kill Your Darlings	Producer	

==== Television ====
Year	Title	Notes	Ref.
2004	Samantha: An American Girl Holiday	Executive producer; television film	
2005	Felicity: An American Girl Adventure	Executive producer; television film	
2006	Molly: An American Girl on the Home Front	Executive producer; television film	
2018–2020	Homecoming	Co-executive producer	
2022	Gaslit	Co-executive producer	
2023	The Last Thing He Told Me	Executive producer	
2024	Fool Me Once	Producer	
