= Sybil Temtchine =

American actress

Sybil Temchen
- Born: New York City, New York, U.S.
- Occupation: Actress

Sybil Temchen is an American actress who has appeared in over 15 TV shows and pilots including, Revenge, Without a Trace, Close to Home, and Steven Bochco's Marriage.

== Career ==
Temchen is best known for her roles in The Passion of Ayn Rand, USA's remake of Kojak, Ten Benny, and others. She also starred in the movie Footprints (2011), which was written and directed by Steven Peros.

== Filmography ==
=== Film ===
Year	Title	Role	Notes
1993	Amongst Friends	Laura's Friend	
1995	Ten Benny	Joanne Deturo	
1997	Floating	Julie	
1997	Lesser Prophets	Pharmacist	
1998	Restaurant	Lenore	
1998	Origin of the Species	Kate	
1998	Show & Tell	Amy	
1999	Nice Guys Sleep Alone	Maggie	
1999	Freak Talks About Sex	Moira	
1999	Body Shots	Emma Cooper	
2001	Lip Service	Allison	
2002	The Sweetest Thing	Rebecca	
2003	Manhood	Lucky	
2005	The Cavern	Bailey	
2009	The Undying	Rachel Braun	
2009	Footprints	Our Gal	
2014	Audrey	Audrey	

=== Television ===
Year	Title	Role	Notes
1998, 1999	NYPD Blue	Beth Gilliam	2 episodes
1999	The Passion of Ayn Rand	Caroline	Television film
2000	The Chippendales Murder	Robbie	Television film
2001	Rude Awakening	Gina	Episode: "Ode to Billie and Joe"
2001	Jack & Jill	Bethany	Episode: "The Big Bounce"
2001	When Billie Beat Bobby	Nora Ephron	Television film
2002	The Practice	Emily Coyne	Episode: "Eyewitness"
2002	The Division	Carrie Sandstrom	Episode: "Remembrance"
2002	She Spies	Sara Hills	Episode: "Three Women and a Baby"
2003	Miracles	Kate Armstrong	Episode: "The Ferguson Syndrome"
2005	Kojak	Emily Patterson	8 episodes
2006	Close to Home	Susan	Episode: "Legacy"
2006	Without a Trace	Lisa Hayes	Episode: "Watch Over Me"
2010	All My Children	Dr. Jones	2 episodes
2011	Revenge	Detective West	Episode: "Treachery"
