= Affairs of State (film) =

2018 film directed by Eric Bross

- Theatrical release poster
- Directed by: Eric Bross
- Written by: Tom Cudworth
- Produced by: Stephen Israel
- Starring: David Corenswet; Thora Birch; David James Elliott; Grace Victoria Cox; Mimi Rogers; Adrian Grenier
- Cinematography: Horacio Marquínez
- Edited by: Yaniv Dabach
- Music by: Jonathan Shanes; Justin Bell
- Production companies: Grindstone Entertainment Group; American Film Productions; 13 Films; School Pictures; Cubb Films; 44 Productions; Head Gear Films; Metrol Technology
- Distributed by: Lionsgate
- Release date: June 15, 2018 (United States)
- Running time: 97 minutes
- Country: United States
- Language: English

Affairs of State is a 2018 American political thriller film directed by Eric Bross and starring David Corenswet (in his film debut), Thora Birch, David James Elliott, Grace Victoria Cox, Mimi Rogers, and Adrian Grenier. It was released in select theaters and via video on demand on June 15, 2018, by Lionsgate.

== Synopsis ==
A young congressional aide, Michael Lawson (David Corenswet), unwillingly has an affair with the wife (Mimi Rogers) of his boss, Senator John Baines (David James Elliott). Meanwhile, Baines' ruthless top aide (Adrien Grenier) is in his way. Lawson then unexpectedly falls for the Senator's daughter (Grace Victoria Cox) and must go tête à tête with his leftist activist roommate, Callie (Thora Birch).

== Critical response ==
Noel Murray of the Los Angeles Times stated, "an engaging if ungainly hybrid of The Graduate and House of Cards, the political potboiler Affairs of State benefits greatly from being both timely and, for this day and age, uncommon. In an era when so many indies are either genre exercises or quirky dramedies, a well-acted, ripped-from-the-headlines melodrama is a novelty."

Conversely, Derek Smith of Slant Magazine offered in summation, "as Affairs of State's primary interests lie almost exclusively between the sheets, the intermittent jabs taken at establishment politics feel like disingenuous, cheap shots intended to give the film a sense of depth and gravity that it doesn't earn."
