= Footprints (2011 film) =

- Directed by: Steven Peros
- Written by: Steven Peros
- Produced by: Steven Peros; John Peros
- Starring: Sybil Temtchine; H.M. Wynant; Pippa Scott
- Cinematography: Adam Teichman
- Edited by: Travis Rust
- Music by: Christopher Caliendo
- Distributed by: Paladin Films
- Release date: April 15, 2011
- Running time: 80 minutes
- Country: United States
- Language: English

Footprints is a 2011 American independent film written by Steven Peros and marking his feature directorial debut. The film stars Sybil Temtchine, H.M. Wynant, and Pippa Scott.

== Plot ==
A woman (Sybil Temtchine) wakes up at sunrise on the footprints and handprints of Grauman's Chinese Theatre in Hollywood with no idea who she is or how she got there. Upon awakening, she wonders if she isn’t, in fact, lost in a dream.

Regardless of whether she is dreaming or wide awake, she sets off on her journey, from one person to the next, one famous locale after the other. Among the Hollywood fringe denizens with whom she comes into contact are a pair of tour guides, two superhero impersonators, a Scientology auditor, and a poster shop owner. She is also disquietingly followed by a Stranger who may be real or a figment of her unsteady imagination.

Although her feet only fleetingly leave Hollywood Boulevard, by sundown Our Gal will piece together the revelatory truth about her existence and the reason for her awakening, forcing her to make choices that will literally result in either her life or death.

== Cast ==
- Sybil Temtchine as Our Gal/Daisy
- H.M. Wynant as Victor
- Pippa Scott as Genevieve
- John Brickner as E-Man
- Catherine Bruhier as Cat Woman
- Charley Rossman as Mike the Tour Guide
- Riley Weston as Super Girl
- Joe Roseto as The Auditor
- R.J. Cantu as Manny
- Jeris Lee Poindexter as The Homeless Man
- Kirk Bovill as The Stranger
- Jim Braswell as Robert
- Steve Pacini as Robo Dude

== Release ==
The film was released theatrically in Manhattan and Los Angeles on April 15, 2011. It was not submitted for rating by the MPAA. After being hailed as "One of the Ten Best Films so far this year" by Armond White, Chairman of the New York Film Critics Circle in his annual mid year report (White had also praised the film at length when it was first released), it expanded to San Francisco, and other cities in December 2011 where Mick LaSalle applauded it in the San Francisco Chronicle. It was released on DVD, VOD, and Digital Download in June, 2012.
