= Body Shots (film) =

1999 film by Michael Cristofer

- DVD cover
- Directed by: Michael Cristofer
- Written by: David McKenna
- Produced by: Jennifer Keohane; Harry Colomby; Guy Riedel; Michael Keaton
- Starring: Sean Patrick Flanery; Jerry O'Connell; Amanda Peet; Tara Reid; Ron Livingston; Emily Procter; Brad Rowe; Sybil Temtchine
- Cinematography: Rodrigo Garcia
- Edited by: Eric A. Sears
- Music by: Mark Isham
- Distributed by: New Line Cinema
- Release dates: October 7, 1999 (Austin Film Festival); October 22, 1999 (United States)
- Running time: 105 minutes (unrated cut); 102 minutes (R-rated cut)
- Country: United States
- Language: English
- Box office: $752,122

Body Shots is a 1999 American drama film written by David McKenna and directed by Michael Cristofer. It stars Sean Patrick Flanery, Jerry O'Connell, Amanda Peet, Tara Reid and Ron Livingston. It tells the story of eight singles whose night of drunken debauchery goes terribly wrong. The film at times has the characters speaking straight to the camera. New Line marketed the film with the poster tagline: "There are movies that define every decade."

== Premise ==
After a night of clubbing, twenty-somethings Jane and Rick wake up in bed together, unable to recall what happened. They are awoken in the early morning by Jane's friend Sara, who has a busted lip and is bleeding on the forehead. Sara accuses the young man she was with last night, rookie pro-football player Michael, of raping her. Both Sara and Michael were drunk that night and headed back to her place in Santa Monica. Michael claims that the sex was consensual, while Sara cannot remember all of the details.

The story rewinds twenty hours before to retrace the chain of events. Rick, Jane, Sarah, and Michael, as well as waitress Whitney, lonely Emma, straight-laced Shawn, and quirky Trent, all descend on a nightclub for dancing and drinks. They periodically address the camera as if in a documentary and talk about whatever is on their minds, mainly their sex lives. Like the men, the women are mostly looking for casual sex, though a meaningful relationship is seen as an added bonus. Each character ends up interacting with another before the night is over. Sara and Michael's encounter is then presented from their different points of view, with detailed contrasts.

== Cast ==
- Sean Patrick Flanery as Rick Hamilton
- Jerry O'Connell as Michael Penorisi
- Amanda Peet as Jane Bannister
- Tara Reid as Sara Olswang
- Ron Livingston as Trent
- Emily Procter as Whitney Bryant
- Brad Rowe as Shawn Denigan
- Sybil Temtchine as Emma Cooper

== Production ==
Tara Reid said the only reason she did a nude scene in this movie was because her character was getting raped: "I'd never do a scene where my character takes off her shirt for no reason, for just a little T&A. That's stupid. That's exploiting yourself. I pass on a lot of movies where they want me to do nude stuff where it's not necessary for the role. It makes a film cheesy."

== Reception ==
The film was critically panned. On the review aggregator website Rotten Tomatoes, 11% of 28 critics' reviews are positive. Metacritic, which uses a weighted average, assigned the film a score of 36 out of 100, based on 29 critics, indicating "generally unfavorable" reviews.

Lawrence Van Gelder of The New York Times said Body Shots "reveals itself to be neither Rashomon nor serious sociology". The Austin Chronicle's Sarah Hepola said the film lacks "either the wicked snap of Neil LaBute (Your Friends & Neighbors) or the humane, self-deprecating wit of Jon Favreau's Swingers. Sadly, people like this probably do exist. But I wouldn't want to spend any time with them, and I imagine you won't either.

Roger Ebert said Body Shots "means well and has some pointed dialogue about legal pitfalls, but it's clueless about its real subject", becoming more of a cautionary tale about alcoholism rather than date rape. Critics bemoaned the film's decision to show both perspectives of the rape in question, yet refusing to take sides. Ebert said the "ending is inconclusive and unsatisfactory; not only does it fail to find answers–but they would be to the wrong questions". Rob Blackwelder of SPLICEDwire criticized the filmmakers for allowing "10 minutes for the football player's point of view", which he said amounted to victim blaming and "playing the sympathy card for the rapist". The shallowness and thin characterizations of the film's characters was also criticized.

Mick LaSalle of the San Francisco Chronicle was one of the few critics to review the film positively. He argued the film's bleak tone is part of its point and commended Reid's performance. He concluded, "This is one of the few movies that don't fully come together until the final shot, and it's one of the most quietly powerful endings in recent memory."
