= HMS Evadne =

1931 yacht and Royal Navy warship

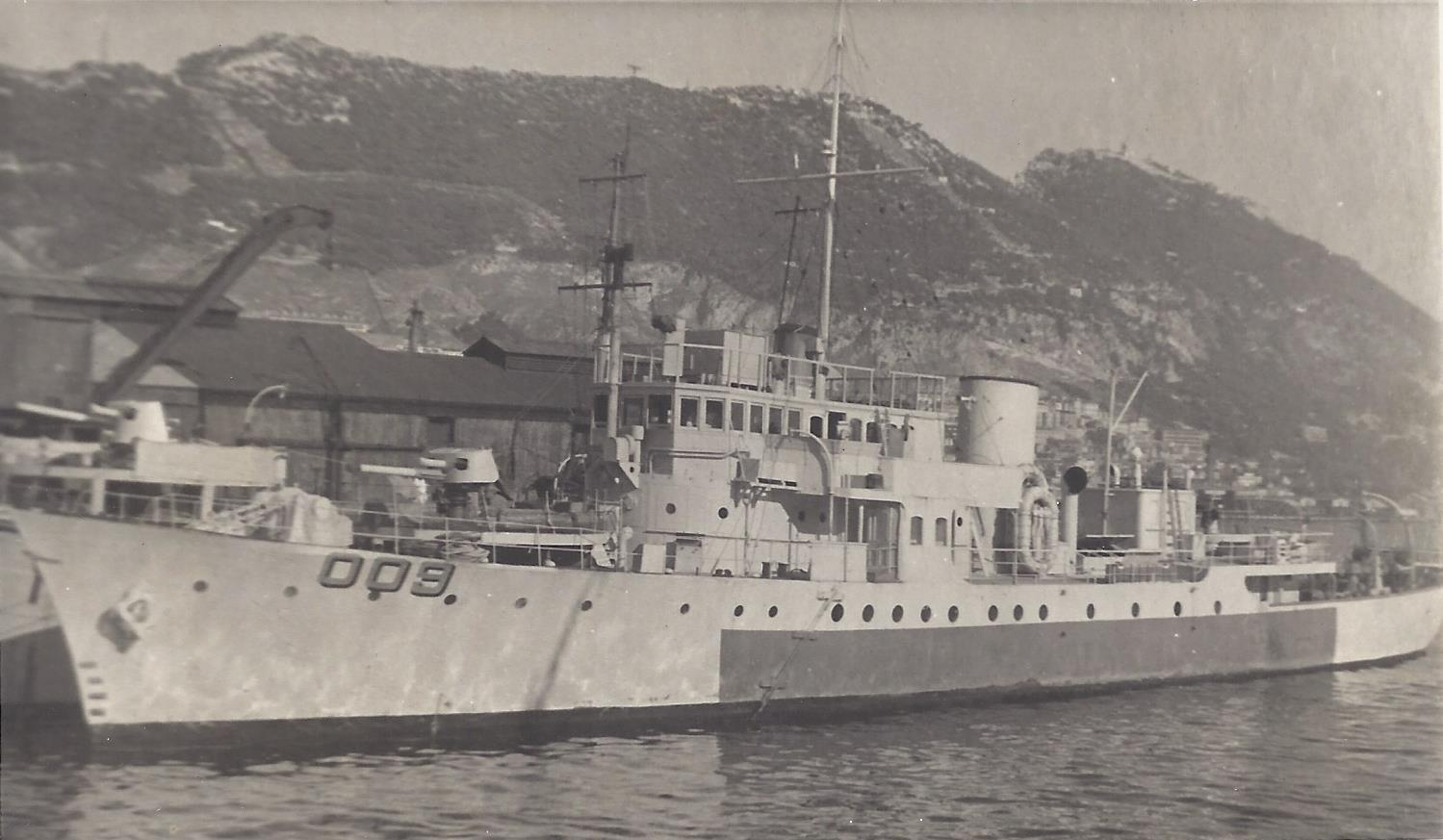
- HMS Evadne at Gibraltar

History

United Kingdom
- Name: 1931-1950 Evadne; 1950-1951 Zapala
- Namesake: Evadne
- Owner: 1931-1950 Richard Fairey; 1950-c.1952 R. J. Reynolds Jr.
- Builder: Camper and Nicholsons, Southampton
- Yard number: 388
- Launched: February 1931
- Completed: 1931
- Identification: Callsign: LHPF, (1932) GTXK; Official number: 161735

United Kingdom
- Name: Evadne
- Commissioned: September 1939
- Identification: FY 009
- Fate: Returned to civil use as a yacht

Panama
- Name: Marala
- Identification: IMO number: 1002603; MMSI number: 518100386; Callsign: E5U3302

General characteristics
- Type: Armed yacht
- Displacement: 581 tons
- Length: 58.83 m (193 ft 0 in)
- Beam: 8.08 m (26 ft 6 in)
- Draught: 3.35 m (11 ft 0 in)
- Propulsion: Two 8cyl MAN 750 bhp (560kw) diesel engines
- Speed: 15.5 knots (28.7 km/h; 17.8 mph)
- Complement: 45
- Armament: One 4 inch BL gun; One 2-pounder pom-pom anti-aircraft gun; Two depth charge throwers

HMS Evadne (FY 009) was a converted yacht, commissioned as a warship by the Royal Navy during the Second World War. She survives today as the yacht Marala.

== Yacht Evadne ==
The Evadne was a large twin-screw motor yacht, built in 1931 by Camper and Nicholsons at Southampton, England as Yard Number 388. She was originally building for the automobile and aircraft engine manufacturer Montague Napier, but he died in January 1931, before she had been named. She was launched in February 1931. Still known as 388, she ran trials in June and was subsequently registered at Southampton with that name, and official number 161735. In December 1931 the yacht was sold for £50,000 to Richard Fairey, of Fairey Aviation and later renamed Evadne.

He lent Evadne to Amelia Earhart in 1932 after weather conditions forced her to end her Transatlantic Solo Flight in Ireland rather than Paris, so she could meet her fans at Cherbourg.

== Naval service ==
Hired by the Admiralty in September 1939, she was refitted in England as an anti-submarine vessel and commissioned as HMS Evadne.

=== Irish Sea ===
Based in Liverpool initially, she carried out patrols and other duties in the Irish Sea. In 1940 she was fitted out as an anti-submarine vessel at the Grayson Rollo shipyard. Subsequently she was employed on examination service duties at Holyhead and escorting convoys in the Irish Sea, from bases at Holyhead, Milford Haven and Liverpool.

=== Bermuda ===
In July 1942 Evadne joined the Highlander escort group to escort a convoy across the Atlantic before breaking away to the Imperial fortress colony of Bermuda, where she was employed on anti-submarine duties at the Royal Naval Dockyard (Evadne operated outside of Bermuda's barrier reef, leaving the enclosed waters to HMS Castle Harbour, then HMS Sumar).

=== Gibraltar ===
Evadne remained in Bermuda until being reallocated to the Commander-in-Chief Mediterranean, arriving on 12 March 1944 in Gibraltar, where she was based until hostilities ended.

On 19 February 1945, she badly damaged German U-boat U-300 with depth charges in the Strait of Gibraltar, in position 35°54′N 05°43′W. The U-boat was subsequently sunk on 22 February in the North Atlantic west of Cadiz, in position 36°29′N 08°20′W, by gunfire from the British minesweepers HMS Recruit and HMS Pincher. Nine of the 50 crew were lost.

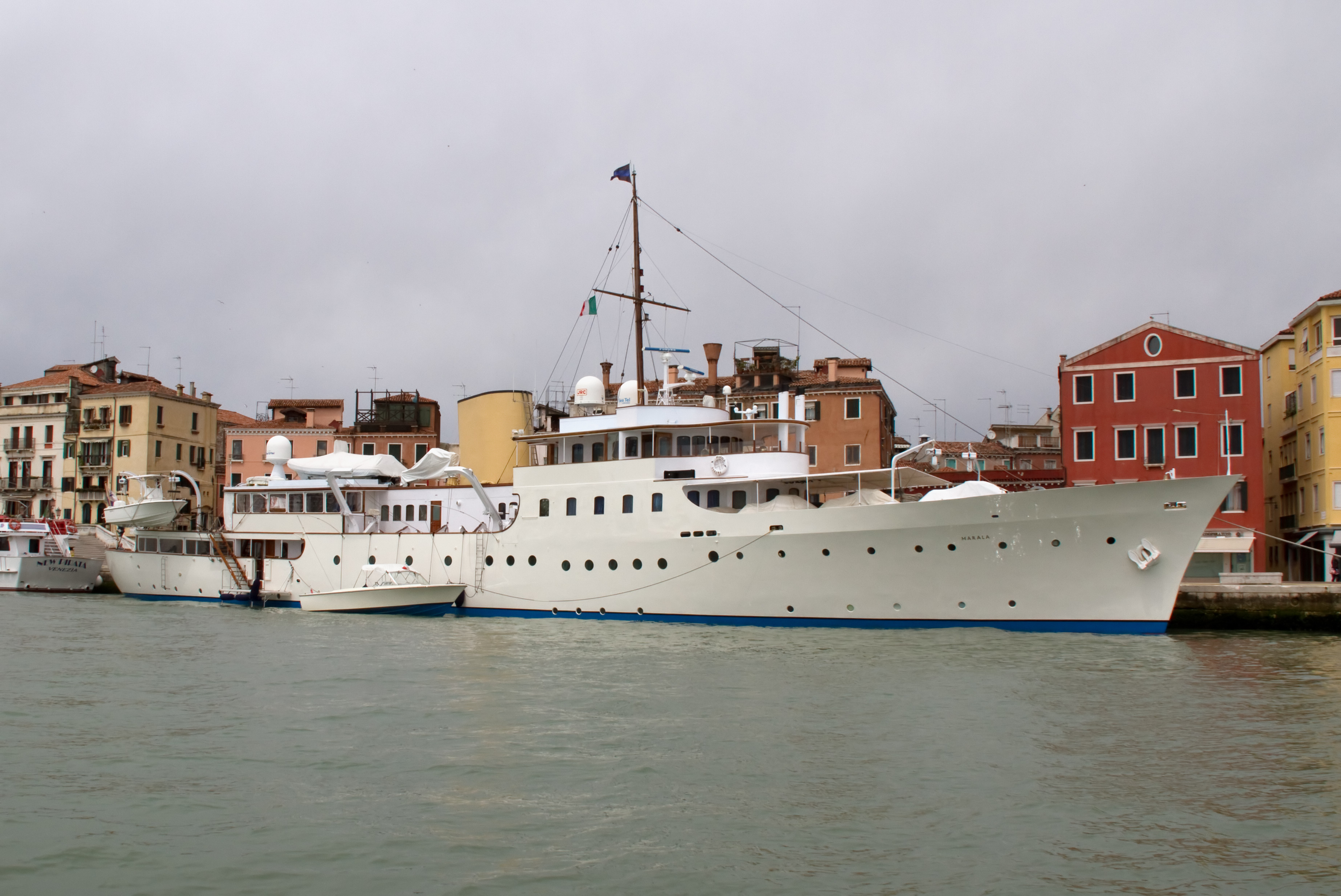
Yacht Marala in Venice in 2012

Evadne arrived back in Portsmouth on 6 September 1945 and was paid off the following month.

== Return to yachting ==
Following the war, Evadne returned to civil life as a yacht. By September 1950 she had been sold to a private British company (Zapla Ltd), renamed Zapala for the use of the American businessman R. J. Reynolds Jr., of the eponymous tobacco company, initially for a world cruise. Reynolds owned Sapelo Island on the Atlantic coast of Georgia, known by Spanish colonists as Zapala.

In 1952 she was bought by Arturo López Willshaw who renamed her Gaviota IV. He had her lavishly redecorated by Georges Geffroy. Arturo entertained many famous guests on board, including Salvador Dali. Many of the Geffroy items were sold at auction by Sothebys.

Following the death of André François-Poncet in 1962 she was bought by Robert Zellinger de Balkany, a French retail property magnate, who renamed her Marala, a portmanteau of the names of his first two daughters, Alexandra and Maria. He owned her until his death in 2015. During this period notable users included Frank Sinatra, who hired her for the month of June 1970, and hosted Grace Kelly and Princess Alexandra of Kent, among others.

The yacht operates today in the Mediterranean, under the name MY Marala, still with her original engines.

== On film ==
The Evadne (now Marala) was the setting of the 2001 film The Cat's Meow, in which she represented William Randolph Hearst's yacht, the Oneida.
