= USS Gannet =

USS Gannet is a name used more than once by the U.S. Navy to name its vessels:

- USS Gannet (AM-41), was laid down 1 October 1918 by the Todd Shipyard Corporation, New York
- USS Gannet (MSC-290), was laid down 1 May 1959 by the Tacoma Boatbuilding Company, Tacoma, Washington
