= Kirk Bovill =

American actor

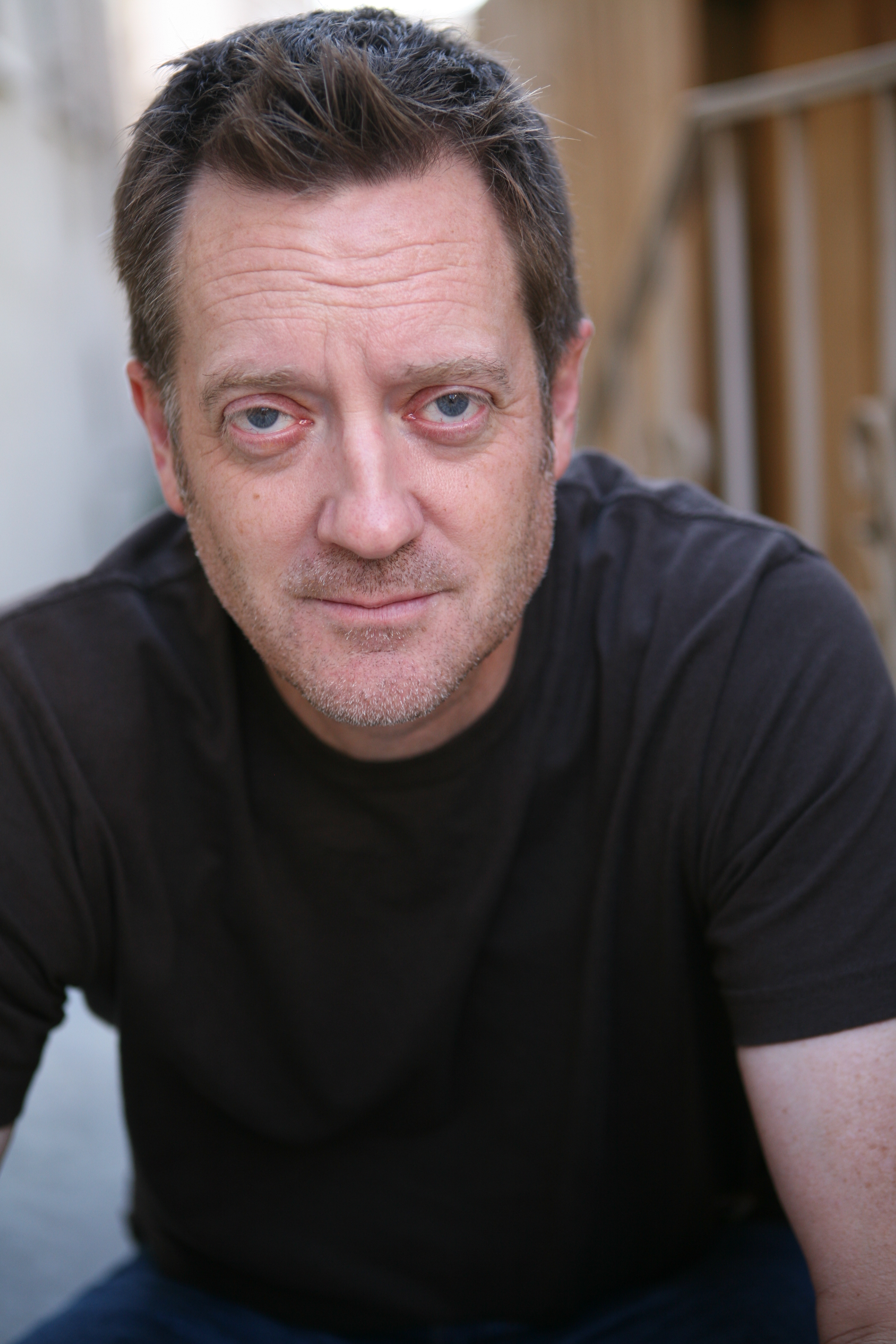
- Bovill in 2008
- Born: January 17, 1961 (age 65); Wayne, Nebraska, U.S.
- Occupations: Actor; writer; producer
- Years active: 2007–present
- Spouse: Joni Bovill (m. 1995)

Kirk Bovill (born January 17, 1961) is an American actor, writer, voice-over artist and producer. His film credits include Vice, 20th Century Women, Free State of Jones, Get On Up, Contraband, Texas Killing Fields, White Lightnin', The Butterfly Circus, and God Bless America.

== Early life ==
Bovill was born in Wayne, Nebraska, the son of Judy Bovill, a teacher, artist, and writer, and Ron Bovill, a college professor, coach, writer, and former actor, who filmed national Wells Fargo commercials in the 1970s as Mark Twain. After attending Aurora High School, he headed off to the University of Nebraska–Lincoln, where he graduated in 1984 with a bachelor's degree in Biology. He coached women's track as an undergraduate assistant at the school and was on the staff that won three national indoor team titles. He completed a master's degree in Journalism with a minor in Advertising at Louisiana State University in 1987. He coached women's track as a graduate assistant and was on the staff that won LSU’s first two NCAA team titles. Also during his stay, he earned CoSIDA National Runner-Up Honors for writing the 1986 Track and Field Media Guide.

== Career ==
While still working as a marketing director in the high tech sector, Bovill started out at Hollywood’s The Comedy Store in the improv group that opened up the highly successful comedy show, Trippin’ on Tuesdays in 2006, which at times was hosted by Kevin Hart. After coming off the stage one night, Robin Williams told Bovill that "he was a funny guy". Two weeks later, he quit his marketing job at the age of 46 and entered the entertainment business. He has since accumulated more than 100 credits over the past 15 years.

He had a recurring guest star role on HBO's hit series Winning Time: The Rise of the Lakers Dynasty as Donald Sterling. The series was created by Max Borenstein and Jim Hecht, based on the book Showtime: Magic, Kareem, Riley, and the Los Angeles Lakers Dynasty of the 1980s by Jeff Pearlman.

Other recent television credits includes guest star and recurring roles on CSI: Vegas, Better Call Saul, American Horror Story: Asylum, Perfect Harmony, Hawaii Five-0, Brooklyn Nine-Nine and Bosch.

He began his career in network television in 2007 as an armed enforcer in Hallmark's Murder 101 opposite legendary Dick Van Dyke. He followed that with roles in a number of shows, including Criminal Minds, CSI, Young Sheldon, NCIS, Shameless, Grey's Anatomy, Leverage, It's Always Sunny in Philadelphia, Sons of Anarchy, Southland, and Days of Our Lives.

His film breakthrough was British director Dominic Murphy's dark drama, White Lightnin’, as the redneck killer Long which premiered at the Sundance and the Berlin International Film Festivals in 2009. The film is loosely based on the true story of Jesco White.

That was followed up with several film roles including; Adam McKay's Oscar winning Vice as Henry Kissinger with Christian Bale, Amy Adams, and Sam Rockwell, Mike Mills's 20th Century Women with Annette Bening, Greta Gerwig, Elle Fanning and Billy Crudup, the James Brown biopic Get On Up, with Viola Davis, Octavia Spencer, Taraji P. Henson and Chadwick Boseman, and helmed by Tate Taylor, Contraband with Mark Wahlberg, Kate Beckinsale, Ben Foster and Giovanni Ribisi, Texas Killing Fields with Chloë Grace Moretz, Sam Worthington, Jessica Chastain and Jeffrey Dean Morgan, The Butterfly Circus, God Bless America, Paramount's Circle of 8, and Footprints.

He appears in hit video games Dead Rising 3 and Wolfenstein II: The New Colossus. In Dead Rising 3, Bovill's character Dick Baker was the co-op player.

He has released two critically acclaimed CDs with his wife, Joni Bovill under their indie label, Elmo Records. Several songs tracked on indie top 50 charts, including "Let Go" which reached #1 and have licensed their music to film and TV projects. Bovill wrote or co-wrote all of the songs.

Prior to entering into the entertainment industry, Bovill was an international marketing executive in high technology in the optoelectronics field for a number of years. He's been published in technical journals.

Before that, he spent six years in the collegiate coaching ranks at the University of Nebraska–Lincoln as an undergraduate assistant and Louisiana State University as a graduate assistant in track and field.

== Personal life ==
Bovill married actress Joni Bovill in Negril, Jamaica in 1995. The two starred together in the Better Call Saul episode "Hit and Run" in the final season as husband and wife. The episode was directed by Better Call Saul series regular Rhea Seehorn. Joni's brother, Henry Green, is a member of the multi-Grammy nominated Gospel group, The Williams Brothers.

The Bovills are foster advocates. They serve as ambassadors for Kids in the Spotlight which provides foster youth an opportunity to create short films of their stories. In addition, they support the work of Light Africa Ministry in Uganda which has built a K-12 school in Kampala for disadvantaged children to get an education.

Bovill is an avid cyclist and certified scuba diver.

== Filmography ==
=== Television ===
- Eleventh Hour (2008, 1 episode, as Concerned Father)
- Criminal Minds (2009, 1 episode, as Man)
- Leverage (2009, 1 episode, as Sheriff Delahoussaye)
- CSI: Crime Scene Investigation (2009, 1 episode, as Dale Durney)
- Ghost Whisperer (2009, 1 episode, as Straight Jacket Ghost)
- Days of Our Lives (2009, 2 episodes, as Craftsman)
- Circle of 8 (2009, 1 episode, as Cop #1)
- Sons of Anarchy (2010, 1 episode, as PSNI #1)
- Southland (2012, 1 episode, as Crazy Bob)
- American Horror Story: Asylum (2012, 1 episode, as Phil)
- Grey's Anatomy (2012, 1 episode, as Brian Turner)
- Brooklyn Nine-Nine (2013–14, 2 episodes, as Paul Haimes)
- Bosch (2014–15, 3 episodes, as Harry's Foster Father)
- The Mentalist (2015, 1 episode, as Driver)
- Training Day (2017, 1 episode, as Gun Shop Owner)
- Hawaii Five-O (2017, 1 episode, as Marty Reynolds)
- American Crime (2017, 1 episode, as Marvin)
- Chance (2017, 1 episode, as Homeless Man)
- The Mick (2017, 1 episode, as Announcer)
- I'm Dying Up Here (2018, 1 episode, as Judge Thomas)
- The Assassination of Gianni Versace: American Crime Story (2018, 1 episode, as Lawyer)
- Young Sheldon (2018, 1 episode, as Actor)
- NCIS (2018, 1 episode, as Richard Sims)
- Deadwax (2018, 1 episode, as Tuck Weston)
- It's Always Sunny in Philadelphia (2019, 1 episode, as Colonel Washington)
- Kevin Hart's Guide to Black History (2019, as Confederate Sentry)
- Perfect Harmony (2019–20, 2 episodes, as Bibs)
- Ratched (2020, 1 episode, as Prison Representative)
- CSI: Vegas (2021, 1 episode, as Seymour Finch)
- Better Call Saul (2022, 1 episode, as Mr. Ryman)
- Winning Time (2022-23, 2 episodes, as Donald Sterling)

=== Film ===
- Murder 101 (2006, as Enforcer #2)
- The Adventures of Umbweki (2009, as Principal)
- White Lightnin' (2009, as Long)
- The Butterfly Circus (2009, as Jimmy - Painted Man)
- Footprints (2009, as Solitary Stranger)
- What Would Jesus Do? (2010, as James Clayton)
- Forgiveness (2011, as Tow Truck Driver)
- Fanaddict (2011, as Eccentric Husband)
- Texas Killing Fields (2011, as Boyfriend)
- God Bless America (2011, as Police Captain)
- Life's an Itch (2011, as Dr. Meyer)
- Contraband (2012, as Crew Member)
- The Trace (2012, as Manager #1)
- Bending the Rules (2012, as Meter Man)
- Neron (2013, as Detective Corrigan)
- The Den (2013, as Dale)
- The Sighting (2013, as Crazy Pete)
- Get On Up (2014, as Announcer)
- Last Supper (2014, as Pharmacist)
- Free State of Jones (2016, as Merchant)
- 20th Century Women (2016, as Dorothea's Dinner Guest)
- A Crooked Somebody (2018, as Earl)
- Vice (2018, as Henry Kissinger)
- Just Mercy (2019, as David Walker)

=== Video games ===
- Dead Rising 3 (2013, as voice of Dick Baker)
- Wolfenstein II: The New Colossus (2017, as voice of Toomer Deschamps, Jeb Jim, Joseph)
