= USS Henry R. Mallory =

American transport for the United States Navy

Coordinates: 56.3152°N 35.5666°W

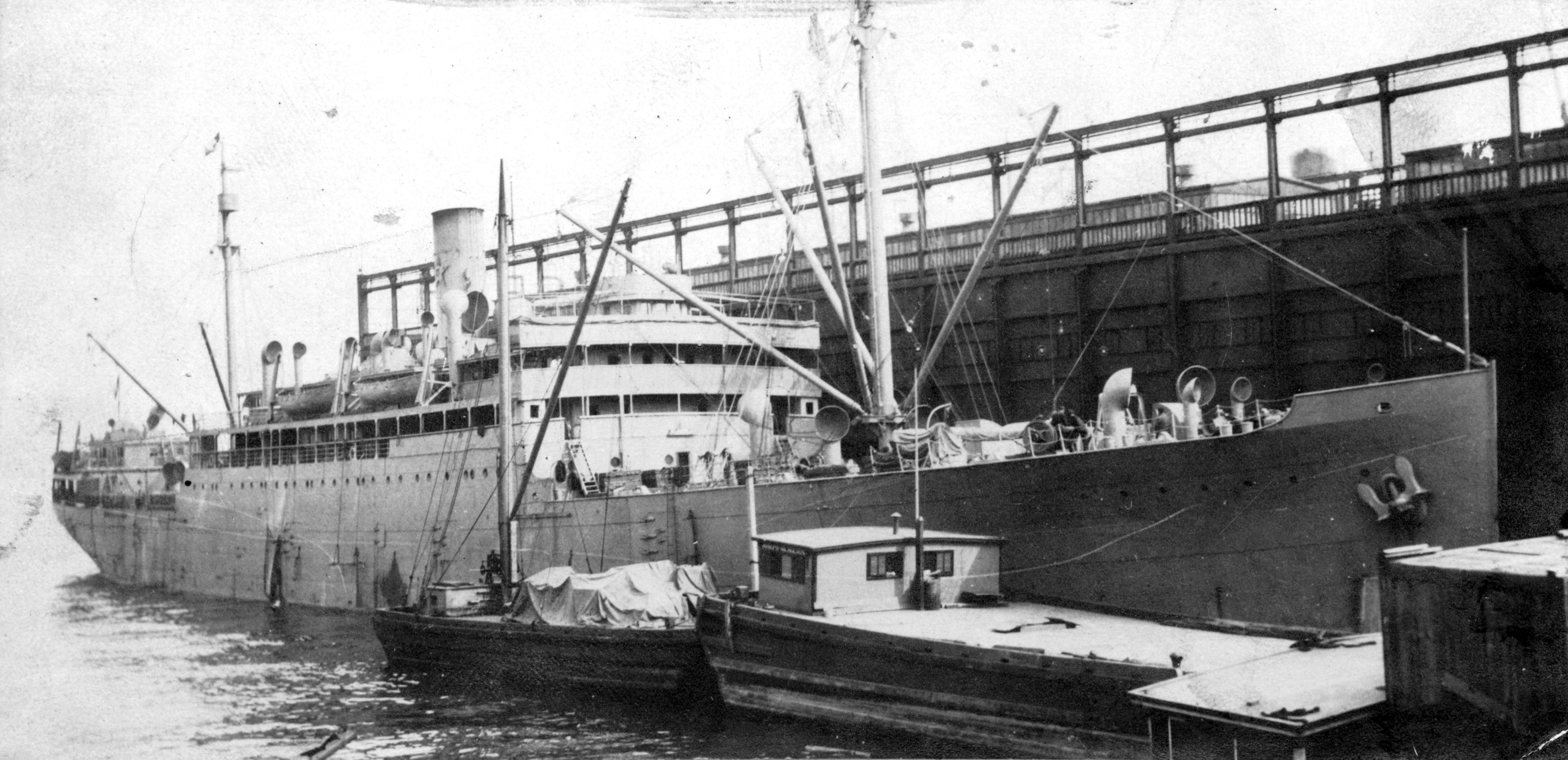
- USS Henry R. Mallory in port, c. 1919

History

United States
- Name: SS Henry R. Mallory
- Namesake: Henry R. Mallory
- Owner: Mallory Lines
- Launched: 1916
- Fate: Expropriated by U.S. Army, 24 May 1917

United States
- Name: USAT Henry R. Mallory
- Acquired: 24 May 1917
- Out of service: 13 April 1918
- Fate: transferred to U.S. Navy

United States
- Name: USS Henry R. Mallory
- Acquired: 13 April 1918
- Commissioned: 17 April 1918
- Decommissioned: 30 August 1919
- Fate: Returned to civilian owners

United States
- Name: SS Henry R. Mallory
- Acquired: 1920
- Fate: Sunk 7 February 1943

General characteristics
- Displacement: 10,910 t
- Length: 440 ft 2 in (134.16 m)
- Beam: 54 ft 6 in (16.61 m)
- Draft: 24 ft (7.3 m)
- Speed: 15 knots (28 km/h)
- Troops: 2,200
- Armament: World War I: 4 × 5-inch (130 mm) guns; World War II: 1 × 4-inch (100 mm) guns; 2 × 3-inch (76 mm) guns; 8 × 20 mm AA guns

USS Henry R. Mallory (ID-1280) was a transport for the United States Navy during World War I. She was also sometimes referred to as USS H. R. Mallory or as USS Mallory. Before her Navy service she was USAT Henry R. Mallory as a United States Army transport ship. From her 1916 launch, and after her World War I military service, she was known as SS Henry R. Mallory for the Mallory Lines. Pressed into service as a troopship in World War II by the War Shipping Administration, she was torpedoed by the German submarine U-402 in the North Atlantic Ocean and sank with the loss of 272 men—over half of those on board.

== World War I ==
SS Henry R. Mallory was built by the Newport News Shipbuilding & Drydock Co. of Newport News, Virginia (yard no. 193), and delivered to the Mallory Steamship Line on 21 October 1916. Named for Mallory Lines president Henry R. Mallory, she operated on a New Orleans – New York route, carrying passengers and freight.

=== U.S. Army service ===
After the United States declared war on Germany in April 1917, the United States Army, needing transports to get its men and materiel to France, had a select committee of shipping executives pore over registries of American shipping. The committee selected Henry R. Mallory and thirteen other American-flagged ships that were sufficiently fast, could carry enough fuel in their bunkers for transatlantic crossings, and, most importantly, were in port or not far at sea. After Henry R. Mallory discharged her last load of passengers and cargo, she was officially handed over to the Army on 24 May, one of the first three ships acquired.

Before any troop transportation could be undertaken, all of the ships were hastily refitted. Of the fourteen ships, ten, including Henry R. Mallory, were designated to carry human passengers; the other four were designated as animal ships. The ten ships designated to carry troops had all of their second- and third-class accommodations ripped out and replaced with berths for troops. Cooking and toilet facilities were greatly expanded to handle the large numbers of men aboard. Gun platforms were installed on each ship before docking at the Brooklyn Navy Yard to have the guns themselves installed. (Note: The only exception was for SS Finland, an American Line steamer in transatlantic service to Liverpool. Finland had already been outfitted for guns in early 1917.) All the ships were manned by merchant officers and crews but carried two U.S. Navy officers, Navy gun crews, quartermasters, signalmen, and wireless operators. The senior Navy officer on board would take control if a ship came under attack.

The American convoy carrying the first units of the American Expeditionary Forces were broken into four groups; Henry R. Mallory was in the third group with San Jacinto and Finland, and escorts consisting of cruiser Charleston, armed collier Cyclops, and destroyers Allen, Preston, and McCall. Henry R. Mallory departed with her group on 14 June for Brest, France, steaming at a 13-knot (24 km/h) pace. A thwarted submarine attack on the first convoy group, and reports of heavy submarine activity off of Brest resulted in a change in the convoy's destination to Saint-Nazaire.

After her return from France, Henry R. Mallory sailed again in the 5th convoy on 31 July, the 7th convoy on 8 September, and the 12th convoy on 26 November, all of which sailed from the New York embarkation point in Hoboken, New Jersey. In January 1918, Henry R. Mallory became the first transport to sail from the Newport News embarkation port, when—loaded with eight aero squadrons—she sailed on 17 January. (Note: Crowell and Wilson show Henry R. Mallory sailing from Newport News on 24 January 1918 as part of the 18th convoy. See: Crowell and Wilson, p. 605.) Departing again from Hoboken on 14 March in the 24th convoy, Henry R. Mallory began her last journey under Army charter. After arriving in France on 26 March and landing her troops, Henry R. Mallory began her return to the United States with Army transport Tenadores and Navy transport Mercury. At 11:45 on 4 April, a German submarine fired torpedoes at the group. Through evasive maneuvers, none of the ships were hit, and with timely gunfire targeting the sub, no more was seen of the threat. Arriving back in the United States on 13 April, Henry R. Mallory was handed over to the U.S. Navy.

=== U.S. Navy transport duties ===
After problems with crew discipline aboard Army transports Antilles and Finland when they were torpedoed, (Note: Antilles was sunk. Finland, carrying some of Antilles' survivors on board, was torpedoed but made it safely back to port for repairs.) the U.S. Navy, led by the recommendations of Rear Admiral Albert Gleaves, insisted that all troop transports be manned entirely by Navy personnel. This was accomplished soon after so as to avoid the need for what Gleaves called "ignorant and unreliable men" who were "the sweepings of the docks". Accordingly, Henry R. Mallory was handed over to the Navy on 13 April 1918 and commissioned on 17 April.

Other than the official change command of the vessel, little else change for Henry R. Mallory. She sailed in her first convoy under Navy command on 23 April, and continued carrying troops to France, making five additional trips before the Armistice in November 1918. In all, Henry R. Mallory carried 9,756 troops to France.

With the fighting at an end, the task of bringing home American soldiers began almost immediately. Henry R. Mallory did her part by carrying home 14,514 healthy and wounded men in seven roundtrips. Henry R. Mallory returned from her last Navy voyage on 29 August 1919, and was returned to the Mallory Lines the following day.

== World War II ==
In the early stages of World War II for the United States, the War Shipping Administration requisitioned Henry R. Mallory for use as a civilian-manned troopship in July 1942. Remaining under the operation of her owners, Agwilines Inc, she began operation on U.S. Army schedules in July 1942, when she sailed from New York to Belfast. On 6 July 1942, along with SS Cathcart, she rescued survivors of the British merchantmen SS Westmoreland, which had been torpedoed by German submarine U-566 220 nautical miles northward of Bermuda (unfortunately, HMS Sumar and USS Gannet (AM-41) had left Bermuda after receipt of the Westmoreland's distress signal on 2 June 1942, and, unaware of the rescue of Westmoreland's crew, fell prey to German submarine U-653 which sank USS Gannet at 0142 Hours on 8 June with the loss of sixteen lives). After her return to New York in August, she made way to Boston from whence she sailed to Saint John, Wabana, Newfoundland; Sydney, Nova Scotia; and Halifax, before returning to New York in October.

After first sailing to Boston and Newport, Rhode Island, Henry R. Mallory departed New York as a part of Convoy SC-118 headed for Liverpool via Halifax on 24 January 1943. The crew on board Henry R. Mallory consisted of 9 officers, 68 crewmen, and 34 United States Navy Armed Guard (who manned the 11 guns on deck). Also on board were 383 passengers, consisting of 2 civilians, 136 from the U.S. Army, 72 from the U.S. Marine Corps, and 173 from the U.S. Navy. As the convoy, which consisted of 60 ships and 26 escorts, sailed near Iceland, a "wolfpack" of Kriegsmarine U-boats attacked the convoy repeatedly over a four-day period. Some 20 U-boats participated, ultimately sinking 12 Allied ships, including Henry R. Mallory; three U-boats were lost.

It was at 06:59 on 7 February 1943 when, traveling in station 33 of the convoy, Henry R. Mallory was hit by a torpedo launched from U-402 around 600 nmi (1,100 km; 690 mi) south-southwest of Iceland. Hit in the number three hold on the starboard side, the ship began settling by the stern, listing to port and sank at about 07:30. Of Henry R. Mallory's ten lifeboats, only three were launched, holding 175 men. Many other men jumped overboard for rafts in the water.

None of the ships in the convoy were aware of the Mallory's predicament. The US destroyer Schenck—searching for survivors from the rescue ship, SS Toward, sunk three hours earlier, also by U-402—saw lights but was denied permission to investigate. Only when survivors were found by U.S. Coast Guard cutter Bibb some four hours later was the fate of Henry R. Mallory made clear. Bibb rescued 205 men, three of whom later died. Another Coast Guard cutter, Ingham, rescued a further 22, of whom two later died. Among the 272 dead were the ship's master, 48 crew, 15 armed guards and 208 passengers.

== Bibliography ==
- Charles, Roland W. (April 1947). Troopships of World War II. Washington, D.C.: Army Transportation Association. OCLC 1871625.
- Crowell, Benedict; Robert Forrest Wilson (1921). The Road to France: The Transportation of Troops and Military Supplies, 1917–1918. How America Went to War: An Account From Official Sources of the Nation's War Activities, 1917–1920. New Haven: Yale University Press. OCLC 18696066.
- Gleaves, Albert (1921). A History of the Transport Service: Adventures and Experiences of United States Transports and Cruisers in the World War. New York: George H. Doran Company. OCLC 976757.
- Helgason, Guðmundur. "Allied Ships hit by U-boats: Henry R. Mallory". The U-boat War 1939–1945. uboat.net.
- Helgason, Guðmundur. "U-boat Operations: Convoy Battles: SC-118". The U-boat War 1939–1945. uboat.net.
- Naval Historical Center. "Henry R. Mallory". Dictionary of American Naval Fighting Ships. Navy Department, Naval History and Heritage Command.
- Sharpe, Henry Granville (1921). The Quartermaster Corps in the Year 1917 in the World War. New York: Century Co. OCLC 7980339.
