= Restaurant (1998 film) =

1998 film directed by Eric Bross

- Directed by: Eric Bross
- Written by: Tom Cudworth
- Produced by: H. M. Coakley; Shana Stein
- Starring: Adrien Brody; Elise Neal; Malcolm-Jamal Warner; Simon Baker; Catherine Kellner; Jesse L. Martin; Lauryn Hill
- Cinematography: Horacio Marquínez
- Edited by: Keith Reamer
- Music by: Theodore Shapiro
- Release date: April 17, 1998
- Running time: 107 minutes
- Country: United States
- Language: English

Restaurant is a 1998 American independent drama film written by Tom Cudworth and directed by Eric Bross. The film stars Adrien Brody, Elise Neal, Catherine Kellner and Malcolm-Jamal Warner, with supporting appearances by Simon Baker and Lauryn Hill. Restaurant premiered at the Los Angeles Independent Film Festival on April 17, 1998, and earned Adrien Brody an Independent Spirit Award nomination. Set in Hoboken, New Jersey, the film is a romantic dramedy that follows a group of young waiters chasing big dreams, with limited opportunities for success.

== Plot ==
A Hoboken restaurant within sight of NYC and all of its promise is staffed with many aspiring artists of different races, who generally get along well. Chris Calloway, the bartender, is about to mount his first play, based on the fallout of a failed relationship. He strikes up a new relationship with the latest addition to the staff, a singer named Jeanine. The reemergence of his previous girlfriend Leslie, as well as the casting of Kenny, the man whom she cheated on Chris with, along with increasing racial aggression between certain employees, begins to take a toll on Chris.

== Cast ==
Actor	Role
Adrien Brody	Chris Calloway
Elise Neal	Jeanine
Lauryn Hill	Leslie
Malcolm-Jamal Warner	Steven
David Moscow	Reggae
Simon Baker	Kenny
Catherine Kellner	Nancy
Jesse L. Martin	Quincy
Sybil Temtchine	Lenore

== Production ==
Director Bross and writer Cudworth had first met while working at the same Montclair, NJ restaurant, and had long thought about making a film in such a setting. Cudworth had also been involved with an African-American woman for a long time, inspiring the main storyline.

The film was shot in 28 days in New Jersey and New York. The workplace scenes were shot in an actual Hoboken restaurant, which had just been sold and renovated. After shooting, the owners initially kept the name it was given in the film, J.T. McClure's. However, it is now known as the Madison Bar & Grill.

Lauryn Hill was originally cast as the love interest and singer Jeanine. However, when she became pregnant, she was recast as the former girlfriend Leslie.

== Awards and nominations ==
Atlantic City Film Festival

- 1999: Won, "Best Full Feature Drama"

Independent Spirit Awards

- 2001: Nominated, "Best Male Lead" - Adrien Brody

== Soundtrack ==
Tracklist

1. True Fortune "Paradise" 2:55
2. Cap-One "Ladies & Willies" 4:37
3. Evil Minds "All Mine" feat. Lord Tariq 3:57
4. Rawcotiks "Place Ya Bets" 3:30
5. N'Dea Davenport "No Never Again" 3:39
6. Magic Juan "Piece Of Cake" 3:59
7. Infinite "The Game Don't End" 3:34
8. Shabaam Sahdeeq "Are You Ready" 3:49
9. Rated Raw "From The Heart" 3:12
10. Susan Garcia "In My Moment" feat. Magic Juan, Malik 3:44
11. Old World Disorder "3 6 5" feat. Eminem 4:39
12. Truck "Who Am I?" 4:30
13. Adrien 'A. Ranger' Brody "This Ain't A Movie" feat. Rawcotiks 4:36
