= Steven Peros =

American dramatist

Steven Peros is an American playwright, director and screenwriter of film and television. He is the author of both the stage play and screenplay for The Cat's Meow, which was made into the 2001 Lionsgate film directed by Peter Bogdanovich and starring Kirsten Dunst, Eddie Izzard, Edward Herrmann, Cary Elwes, Jennifer Tilly, and Joanna Lumley.

== Career ==
As a playwright, The Cat's Meow had its world premiere in Los Angeles in 1997 and is published by Samuel French, Inc. It has been performed in four countries as of 2013. His earlier play, Karlaboy (1994) also premiered in Los Angeles where it received a Drama-Logue Award for Outstanding Achievement in Writing. It is also published by Samuel French. In 2021, Peros would adapt the play to a musical.

Peros made his directorial debut with Footprints (2011), which was hailed as "One of the Ten Best Films So Far This Year" by Armond White, Chairman of the New York Film Critics Circle and was similarly praised by critics Kevin Thomas, F.X. Feeney, Mick LaSalle, and White during the film's initial release. He followed this with The Undying (2011), which he directed and co-wrote, and which starred Robin Weigert, Wes Studi, Jay O. Sanders, and Sybil Temtchine. For television, he wrote for The Lot and the Lifetime Original Movie A Country Christmas Story.
