= The Cat's Meow =

2001 film by Peter Bogdanovich

- Theatrical release poster
- Directed by: Peter Bogdanovich
- Screenplay by: Steven Peros
- Based on: The Cat's Meow by Steven Peros
- Produced by: Julie Baines; Kim Bieber; Carol Lewis; Dieter Meyer
- Starring: Kirsten Dunst; Cary Elwes; Edward Herrmann; Eddie Izzard; Joanna Lumley; Jennifer Tilly
- Cinematography: Bruno Delbonnel
- Edited by: Edward G. Norris
- Music by: Ian Whitcomb
- Production companies: Dan Films; CP Medien
- Distributed by: Swipe Films (United Kingdom); Lionsgate Films (United States)
- Release dates: August 3, 2001 (LIFF); April 12, 2002 (United States); June 4, 2004 (United Kingdom)
- Running time: 114 minutes
- Countries: United States; Germany; United Kingdom
- Language: English
- Budget: $7 million
- Box office: $3.7 million

The Cat's Meow is a 2001 historical drama film directed by Peter Bogdanovich, and starring Kirsten Dunst, Eddie Izzard, Edward Herrmann, Cary Elwes, Joanna Lumley, Jennifer Tilly, and Ronan Vibert. The screenplay by Steven Peros is based on his 1997 play of the same title, which was inspired by the mysterious death of film mogul Thomas H. Ince that occurred on William Randolph Hearst's yacht during a weekend cruise celebrating Ince's birthday in November 1924. Among those in attendance were Hearst's longtime companion and film actress Marion Davies, fellow actor Charlie Chaplin, writer Elinor Glyn, columnist Louella Parsons, and actress Margaret Livingston. The film provides a speculative assessment on the unclear manner of Ince's death.

An international co-production between the United States, the United Kingdom, and Germany, The Cat's Meow was primarily shot in Greece, which served as a stand-in for coastal Southern California. The film premiered at the Locarno International Film Festival in 2001, and was released theatrically in the United States by Lionsgate in April 2002. It grossed $3.6 million worldwide, and received largely favorable reviews from film critics.

== Plot ==
On November 15, 1924, various individuals board the luxury yacht Oneida in San Pedro, California, including its owner, publishing magnate William Randolph Hearst, and his mistress, silent film star Marion Davies; motion picture mogul Thomas H. Ince, whose birthday is the reason for the weekend cruise, and his mistress, starlet Margaret Livingston (who would portray "the Woman From the City" in F.W. Murnau's Sunrise: A Song of Two Humans three years later); international film star Charlie Chaplin; English writer Elinor Glyn; and Louella Parsons, a film critic for Hearst's New York American.

Several of those participating in the weekend's festivities are at a crossroads in their lives and/or careers. Chaplin, still dealing with the critical and commercial failure of A Woman of Paris and rumors he has impregnated 16-year-old Lita Grey (who appeared in his film The Kid), is in the midst of preparing The Gold Rush. Davies longs to appear in a slapstick comedy rather than the somber costume dramas to which Hearst has kept her confined. Ince's eponymous film studio is in dire financial straits, so he hopes to convince Hearst to take him on as a partner in Cosmopolitan Pictures. Parsons would like to relocate from the East Coast to more glamorous Hollywood.

Hearst suspects Davies and Chaplin have engaged in an affair, a suspicion shared by Ince, who seeks proof he can present to Hearst in order to curry favor with him. In the wastepaper basket in Chaplin's stateroom, Ince discovers a discarded love letter to Davies and pockets it with plans to produce it at an opportune moment. When he finally does, Hearst is enraged. His anger is fueled further when he finds a brooch he had given Davies in Chaplin's cabin. Hearst concludes it was lost there during a romantic liaison, and he rifles Marion's room for further evidence.

Armed with a pistol, Hearst searches the yacht for Chaplin in the middle of the night. Ince, meanwhile, runs into Davies and the two sit and talk with Ince donning a hat Chaplin had worn. Davies explains to Ince her love for Hearst and her regret at an earlier affair with Chaplin. She states "I never loved him" just as Hearst arrives behind them. Thinking Davies is referring to him, and mistaking Ince for Chaplin, a jealous Hearst shoots Ince. The assault is witnessed by Parsons, who had heard noises and went to investigate.

Hearst arranges to dock in San Diego and have a waiting ambulance take the dying Ince home. He phones the injured man's wife and tells her Ince attempted suicide when Livingston tried to end their affair, assuring her the truth won't reach the media. To the rest of his guests he announces Ince's ulcer flared up and required immediate medical attention. Davies, of course, knows the truth, and confides in Chaplin. Also armed with that knowledge is Parsons, who assures Hearst his secret will be safe in exchange for a lifetime contract with the Hearst Corporation, thus laying the groundwork for her lengthy career as one of Hollywood's most powerful gossip columnists.

After seeing Ince off, Hearst confronts Davies and Chaplin. He is berated by Chaplin, who expects Davies to join him. Hearst, however, challenges Chaplin to guarantee Davies that he can promise her a happy life. When Chaplin fails to answer, Hearst informs Chaplin of the vow of silence he and the fellow guests have made to keep the weekend's activities a secret. Chaplin despairs as he realizes the murder has strengthened Davies' love for Hearst.

The film concludes with the guests leaving Ince's funeral, as Glyn relates what became of them:

- Livingston went on to star in a number of successful films and her film salary "inexplicably" went from $300 to $1000 a film.
- Davies starred in more of Hearst's films before finally being allowed to feature in a comedy Show People (1928), which was (as Chaplin predicted) a success and included a couple of cameo appearances by Chaplin. She stayed by Hearst's side until his death in 1951.
- Chaplin married his teenage lover Lita Grey in Mexico and his film The Gold Rush was an overwhelming success.
- Parsons worked for Hearst for many years and subsequently became one of the most successful writers in the history of American journalism.

Tom Ince was largely forgotten after the events of his death. Very few newspapers reported it, no police action was taken, and of all the people on board only one was ever questioned. It is concluded that in Hollywood, "the place just off the coast of the planet Earth," no two accounts of the story are the same.

== Cast ==
- Kirsten Dunst as Marion Davies
- Cary Elwes as Thomas H. Ince
- Edward Herrmann as William Randolph Hearst
- Eddie Izzard as Charlie Chaplin
- Joanna Lumley as Elinor Glyn
- Victor Slezak as George Thomas
- Jennifer Tilly as Louella Parsons
- James Laurenson as Dr. Daniel Goodman
- Ronan Vibert as Joseph Willicombe
- Chiara Schoras as Celia
- Ingrid Lacey as Jessica Barham
- John C. Vennema as Frank Barham
- Claudia Harrison as Margaret Livingston
- Claudie Blakley as Didi
- Steven Peros as Elinor's driver

== Production ==
=== Basis in reality ===
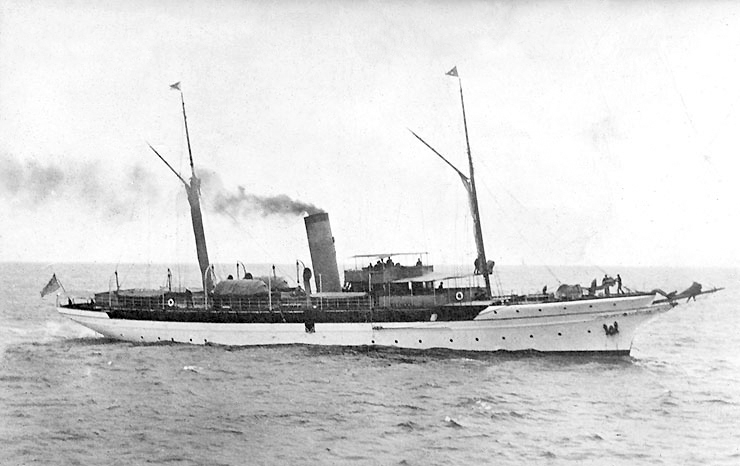
The Oneida, in the July 1916 issue of the yachting journal The Rudder

Film scholar Jonathan Rosenbaum, editor of the 1992 book This is Orson Welles — a record of interviews Peter Bogdanovich conducted with Orson Welles — began his April 2002 review of The Cat's Meow with this exchange about Citizen Kane (1941):

OW: In the original script we had a scene based on a notorious thing Hearst had done, which I still cannot repeat for publication. And I cut it out because I thought it hurt the film and wasn’t in keeping with Kane’s character. If I’d kept it in, I would have had no trouble with Hearst. He wouldn’t have dared admit it was him.
PB: Did you shoot the scene?
OW: No, I didn’t. I decided against it. If I’d kept it in, I would have bought silence for myself forever.

"The incident Welles alluded to in this exchange is the subject of The Cat’s Meow, directed by Bogdanovich and adapted by Steven Peros from his own play," Rosenbaum wrote. "Bogdanovich may see Welles as the inspiration for his film, but I have no idea where Peros got his facts."

Rosenbaum did find a similar story in the 1979 edition of The Film Encyclopedia by Ephraim Katz, in the entry on Thomas Ince; and in the 1971 essay on Citizen Kane by Pauline Kael:

Her principal source was John Houseman, script supervisor for cowriter Herman Mankiewicz, and it seems safe to conclude, even without her prodding, that some version of the story must have cropped up in Mankiewicz’s first draft of the script, which Welles subsequently edited and added to. According to Kael, the only trace of the subplot left in the script is a speech made by Susan Alexander, who was loosely based on Davies, to the reporter Thompson about Kane: “Look, if you’re smart, you’ll get in touch with Raymond. He’s the butler. You’ll learn a lot from him. He knows where all the bodies are buried.” Kael writes, “It’s an odd, cryptic speech. In the first draft, Raymond literally knew where the bodies were buried: Mankiewicz had dished up a nasty version of the scandal sometimes referred to as the Strange Death of Thomas Ince."

"I don’t think we’re likely ever to know for sure what happened on Hearst’s yacht on November 19, 1924," Rosenbaum concluded.

"No director is more steeped in Hearst/Welles/Kane/Hollywood lore than Bogdanovich," wrote film critic Roger Ebert, who heard the Orson Welles version of Thomas Ince's death from Bogdanovich. "It happened that as Bogdanovich told me this story, we were aboard the QE2, crossing to Southampton on the 25th anniversary voyage of the Telluride Film Festival in 1998. When Bogdanovich returned to New York, there was a script waiting for him. It was an adaptation of Steven Peros' play about the very same scandal. Fate was sending him a message."

In a 2008 interview, Bogdanovich said: "I was talking to Orson for my book, This is Orson Welles in 1969 and he said, “You know about the thing that happened on Hearst’s yacht?” He said Welles had been told the story by screenwriter Charles Lederer, Marion Davies's nephew, and that Bogdanovich subsequently confirmed the account with Lederer. "And when Orson told me that story it was virtually the same story as what Steven Peros has written. The particulars in terms of the letter or the hat, those where details hypothesized by Steven, based on his research, but the actual plot — of what happened and who was doing what and why — that was all the same."

=== Casting ===
Bogdanovich cast Kirsten Dunst in the role of Marion Davies, as she had "always wanted to do a twenties story. She has a wonderful period face, looks great in those clothes, and had great instincts." In the role of William Randolph Hearst, a different actor had been cast, but Edward Herrman replaced the unnamed actor after he backed out of the project. Eddie Izzard, who Bogdavonich had seen performing stand-up comedy (and who was primarily known as a comedian) was given the role of Charlie Chaplin, as Bogdanovich felt his comedic sensibilities were compatible with the character of Chaplin, who himself was a comedic performer. Cary Elwes was cast as Thomas Ince, while Joanna Lumley obtained the role of novelist Elinor Glyn. Jennifer Tilly was subsequently cast as Louella Parsons, the forthright and nosy journalist aboard the yacht, and was offered the part by Bogdanovich, who had acted opposite Tilly in the 1997 television film Bella Mafia.

=== Filming ===
Though set in California, filming of The Cat's Meow took place in coastal Greece, and Berlin, Germany. Bogdanovich wanted to shoot the film in black-and-white to capture the feel of the silent era, but studio heads objected. (Black-and-white scenes of Ince's funeral, resembling old newsreel footage, bookend the film.) To compensate, the director ordered costume designer Caroline de Vivaise to dress the cast in only black and white. With only a few weeks to prepare prior to the start of filming, she resorted to shopping in secondhand stores for vintage clothing. Bogdanovich agreed to her request to have some silver and gold on the costumes when many of the pieces she found were trimmed with those colors.

The vessel used to represent the Oneida was actually the Marala. She was originally named Evadne, the private yacht of Charles Fairey of Fairey Aviation, and had patrolled the approaches to Bermuda, and its Royal Naval Dockyard, during the Second World War as HMS Evadne.

=== Music ===
Composer Ian Whitcomb's score was augmented by original recordings that were popular during the period in which the film takes place. These included "Avalon," "Toot Toot Tootsie," and "California, Here I Come" by Al Jolson; "Everybody Loves My Baby" and "Wild Cat Blues" by Clarence Williams; "Stumbling," "Say It With Music," "Somebody Loves Me," and "Linger Awhile" by Paul Whiteman; and "Wabash Blues" by Fletcher Henderson. In addition, Ian Whitcomb & His Bungalow Boys performed many tunes from the era, among them "Ain't We Got Fun," "I'm Just Wild About Harry," "St. Louis Blues," "A Pretty Girl Is Like a Melody," "I'm Nobody's Baby," "Rose of Washington Square," "If You Were the Only Girl in the World," "Margie," "How Ya Gonna Keep 'Em Down on the Farm (After They've Seen Paree)?," and "Alice Blue Gown."

After the film had been completed, music supervisor Joel C. High realized the version of "Charleston" heard in the birthday party scene was a jazz-tinged arrangement from the 1950s and had Ian Whitcomb & His Bungalow Boys record an authentic 1920s rendition to replace it. Bogdanovich preferred the livelier, more contemporary sound of the 1950s version but finally was convinced by High to use the more accurate recording.

== Release ==
=== Box office ===
The film premiered at the Locarno Film Festival in August 2001. It was shown at the 2001 Flanders International Film Festival in Belgium, the 2001 MIFED (Mercato internazionale del film e del documentario) Film Market in Italy, the 2002 International Film Festival Rotterdam, and the 2002 Mar del Plata Film Festival in Argentina before going into limited release in the US in April 2002.

The film grossed $3,209,481 in the United States and $437,513 internationally for a worldwide total of $3,646,994.

=== Critical response ===
On the review aggregator website Rotten Tomatoes, the film has a score of 76% based on 128 reviews, with an average rating of 6.6/10. The website's critics consensus reads: "The Cat's Meow is a deliciously evoked period piece and whodunit." Metacritic, which uses a weighted average, assigned the film a score of 63 out of 100, based on 34 critics, indicating "generally favorable" reviews.

New York Times film critic A. O. Scott called the film "a modest, restrained picture, as small and satisfying as one of Woody Allen's better recent efforts. There is little to distinguish it visually from a made-for-cable historical drama. We observe the events from a polite distance, rather than being plunged into the swirl of decadent Jazz Age high life. The suave camera movements never quite dispel the feeling that we are watching a filmed play. But Mr. Bogdanovich … shows his mastery in his work with the actors, who turn dusty Tinseltown lore into a spry and touching entertainment."

"Apart from its theory about the mistaken death of Ince and its cover-up, the movie's most intriguing theory is that Parsons witnessed it, which might explain her lifetime contract with the Hearst papers," wrote Roger Ebert of the Chicago Sun-Times. "The film is darkly atmospheric, with Herrmann quietly suggesting the sadness and obsession beneath Hearst's forced avuncular chortles. Dunst is as good, in her way, as Dorothy Comingore in Citizen Kane in showing a woman who is more loyal and affectionate than her lover deserves."

"In some ways, Dunst gives the film’s most impressive performance," wrote Jonathan Rosenbaum, who called the film a must-see. "What’s masterful about Bogdanovich’s direction is the cumulative detail, which adds complexity to incidental as well as central characters. He has a graceful way of switching viewpoints from one character to another and an uninsistent yet mainly persuasive sense of period. … This picture might well be considered a more impressive accomplishment than many of his early pictures. But it speaks with a quieter voice, and what it says seems substantially more personal and thoughtful."

In the San Francisco Chronicle, Mick LaSalle stated: "Bogdanovich takes a tale of old Hollywood and infuses it with velocity and enthusiasm. He avoids his twin demons, freneticism and cuteness, and delivers his best picture in years ... His deft use of a single location, his intelligent handling of his ensemble cast and his graceful camera work mark this as a true return to form."

Derek Elley of Variety described the film as "playful and sporty … Dunst gives her best performance to date amid a skilled older cast. Believable as both a spoiled ingenue and a lover to two very different men, Dunst endows a potentially lightweight character with considerable depth and sympathy."

"Elegant, funny and unexpectedly touching, this whodunit about a murder aboard the yacht of William Randolph Hearst represents a bracing comeback for Peter Bogdanovich," wrote Rolling Stone film critic Peter Travers. "Dunst, the teen queen of Bring It On and Crazy/Beautiful, is showstoppingly good, finding humor, heart and surprising gravity in a character often dismissed as a gold digger."

James Christopher of The Times wrote: "The unexpected charm of Bogdanovich's film is that he paints a social scenario worthy of Decline and Fall. His cast are comically hollow and effortlessly insincere … Kirsten Dunst is a marvellous tease as Marion; Eddie Izzard is a manly Chaplin; and Herrmann is hypnotic as the infatuated host who is richer than God."

In the Los Angeles Times, Kevin Thomas stated: "Peter Bogdanovich, who knows his Hollywood history probably better than any other American director, works from Steven Peros' amusing yet poignant script to tell the popular version of the legend in clever and entertaining fashion, loaded with authentic and convincing details."

"What a tonic to be treated to a movie for that most uncourted, ignored and generally dissed of demographics: the grown-ups," wrote Ann Hornaday of The Washington Post. "Based on an urban legend that has been quietly circulating around Hollywood for almost four decades, The Cat's Meow would be grounds for libel if the libeled one were still alive … Bogdanovich directs The Cat's Meow with unfussy clarity, introducing a crowded cast of characters with quick scenes that immediately convey who they are and what they're up to. In the 1970s films The Last Picture Show and Paper Moon, Bogdanovich coaxed some wonderful performances from his actors, and he clearly hasn't lost that touch: Herrmann inhabits Hearst completely (he even bears an uncanny physical resemblance to the late publisher). Dunst, heretofore relegated to kittenish teen roles, comes as close to capturing Davies' effervescence and spontaneity as anyone has (and no one has). Izzard is also very good as Chaplin."

"Bogdanovich's silent crosscutting between close-ups of the characters helps to shorn the film of its theatrical origins," wrote Peter Tonguette in The Film Journal. "Bogdanovich's sensitivity towards his characters and outright insistence that we see even the most gluttonous and poisonous among them as human beings is rare, and commendable, indeed."

Filmink called it "a lovely little movie. Nicely written, full of perfect performances and affection for its characters. Better than Mank, which covers some of the same ground."

=== Accolades ===
Kirsten Dunst was named Best Actress at the Mar del Plata Film Festival.

=== Home media ===
Lions Gate Entertainment released The Cat's Meow on VHS (UPC 031398809531) and DVD (UPC 031398809920) in 2002. A signature series DVD (UPC 031398849520) was released in 2003.

== Sources ==
- Tonguette, Peter (2015). Peter Bogdanovich: Interviews. Jackson, Mississippi: University Press of Mississippi. ISBN 978-1-626-74375-5.
