= Audrey (2014 film) =

- Film poster
- Directed by: Dean Pollack
- Written by: Dean Pollack; Sybil Temtchine
- Produced by: Richard Bever; Sybil Temtchine; Stephen Israel; Dean Pollack
- Starring: Sybil Temtchine
- Cinematography: Gigi Malavasi
- Edited by: Phillip J. Bartell
- Music by: Peter Golub
- Production companies: Manchego Pictures; Chill Entertainment
- Release date: February 14, 2014
- Running time: 81 minutes
- Country: United States
- Language: English

Audrey is a 2014 American comedy film directed by Dean Pollack and starring Sybil Temtchine, who wrote the screenplay with Pollack.

== Cast ==
- Sybil Temtchine as Audrey
- Ed Quinn as Pete
- Jonathan Chase as Gene
- Ed Asner as Walt
- Helena Mattsson as Tess
- Robert Curtis Brown as Stan
- Ethan Phillips as Donny
- Charles Shaughnessy as Jacques
