= The Undying (film) =

2011 film by Steven Peros

- Directed by: Steven Peros
- Written by: David M. Flynn; Steven Peros
- Produced by: David M. Flynn
- Starring: Robin Weigert; Anthony Carrigan; Wes Studi; Jay O. Sanders; Sybil Temtchine
- Cinematography: Robert F. Smith
- Edited by: Lisa Barnable
- Music by: Christopher Caliendo
- Distributed by: MTI Home Video
- Release date: December 13, 2011
- Running time: 105 minutes
- Country: United States
- Language: English

The Undying is a 2011 American supernatural romantic thriller directed by Steven Peros, written by David M. Flynn and Steven Peros, and starring Robin Weigert, Anthony Carrigan, Wes Studi, Jay O. Sanders, and Sybil Temtchine.

== Plot ==
Dr. Barbara Haughton (Robin Weigert) discovers the farmhouse she's recently rented is inhabited by the ghost of Elijah Parmenter, a Civil War soldier.

As her interest in Elijah grows and his presence comes to dominate her dreams, she assists in emergency surgery to save Jason Donovan (Anthony Carrigan), a young stabbing victim. Donovan’s life is saved but he's pronounced brain-dead. After thirty days, his wife agrees to remove him from all life support systems.

As Barbara removes Donovan from the machines that are keeping him alive, she suddenly realizes that his body, no longer wanted or needed, might serve another purpose. She reconnects the body to a mobile life support gurney, brings it to the farmhouse and offers it to the ghost.

Her happiness with Elijah is short-lived when a young girl is murdered the night Barbara is away at a party. Police Lt. Wascoe (Wes Studi) has identified a suspect as the possible killer: Jason Donovan.

== Cast ==
- Robin Weigert as Dr. Barbara Haughton
- Anthony Carrigan as Jason Donovan / Elijah
- Wes Studi as Detective Frank Wascoe
- Jay O. Sanders as Dr. Richard Lassiter
- Sybil Temtchine as Rachel Braun
- Franklin Ojeda Smith as Henry Strawbridge
- Paul David Story as Ghost Elijah
- Paola Mendoza as Betty
- Stefanie Estes as Maragaret
- McGhee Monteith as Donna Marie

== Release ==
After premiering at the Irish Film Institute's annual Horrorthon Film Festival, the film was released direct-to-video on December 13, 2011 by MTI Home Video and is also available via VOD and Digital Download.
