= HMS Castle Harbour =

Civilian harbour vessel

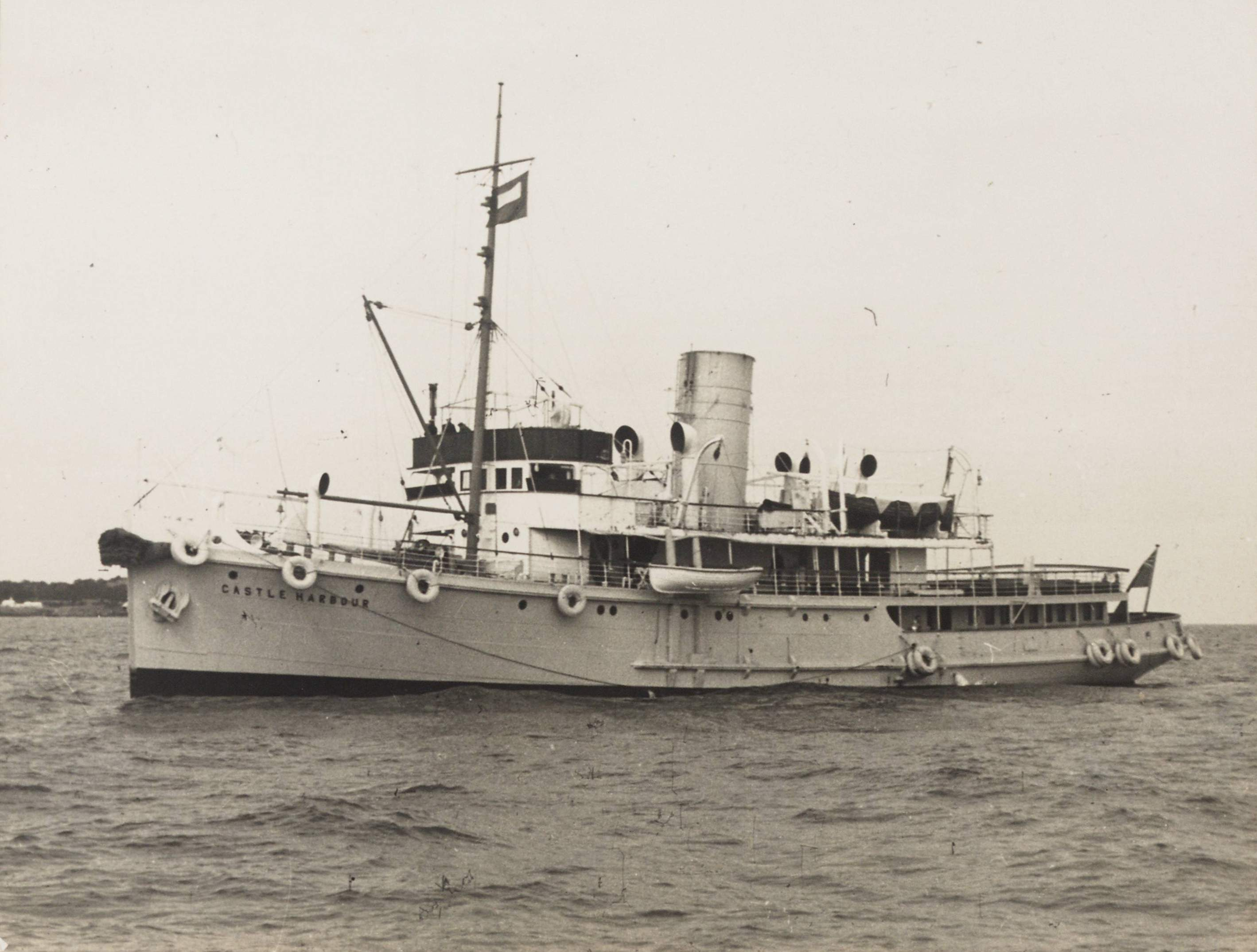
- Castle Harbour, prior to her armament and commissioning as a Royal Navy warship.

History

United Kingdom
- Name: Castle Harbour
- Builder: Blythswood Shipbuilding Co. Ltd
- Launched: 1929
- Completed: 1929
- Home port: Royal Naval Dockyard, Bermuda
- Fate: Sunk 16 October 1942

HMS Castle Harbour was a civilian harbour vessel of 730 tons that was taken-up from trade during the Second World War by the Royal Naval Dockyard in Bermuda for use by the Royal Naval Examination Service and later armed and commissioned as a warship, providing harbour defence from submarines.

== Pre-war civil history ==
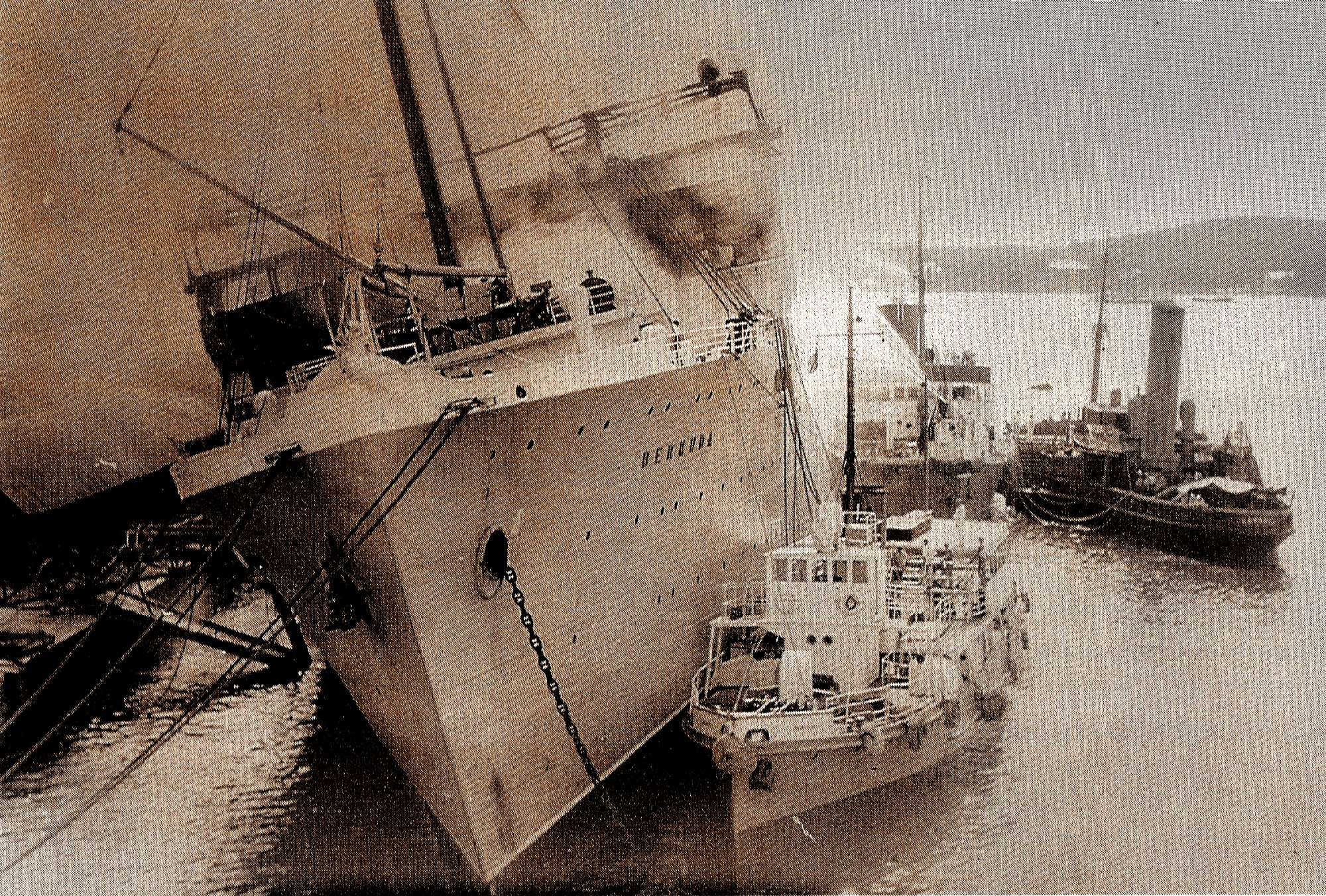
Castle Harbour (rear, left), Bermudian and Royal Navy tugs Sandboy and Creole fight the MV Bermuda fire on 17 June 1931

Built by Blythswood Shipbuilding Co. Ltd in Glasgow, Scotland, for the Bermuda and West Indies Steamship Company as Mid-Ocean in 1929, she was initially, described as a tug, though other sources describe her as a tender, used to transport passengers between liners at anchorage and the shore. While possibly used in both roles, she was used to service Furness-Withy liners that maintained passenger service between Bermuda and North America. The ship was renamed in 1930 in commemoration of Castle Harbour at the East End of Bermuda where Furness-Withy was building the Castle Harbour Hotel and the Mid-Ocean Golf Course.

On the 17 June 1931, the Furness-Withy liner MV Bermuda was consumed by a catastrophic fire at Front Street in the City of Hamilton, which threatened to spread to the city buildings. The Hamilton Fire Brigade and the ship's crew were joined by soldiers and marines, and the fire was finally brought under control after sailors from the Royal Naval Dockyard, trained for fighting fires on warships, arrived with asbestos suits and equipment. From the harbour, Castle Harbour and Royal Navy (RN) tugs Sandboy and Creole trained thirty hoses on Bermuda. Another vessel, the tender Bermudian (originally a Royal Naval vessel named HMS Arctic Whale), was also sent to help. Although heavily damaged, Bermuda was able to be taken to Belfast in Ireland to be rebuilt, but was destroyed there by a second fire on 19 November 1931, and sold for scrap. She broke loose in a storm while under tow to a Rosyth scrapyard and was wrecked on the Scottish coast in Eddrachillis Bay, near Scourie, Sutherland.

== Royal Naval Examination Service ==
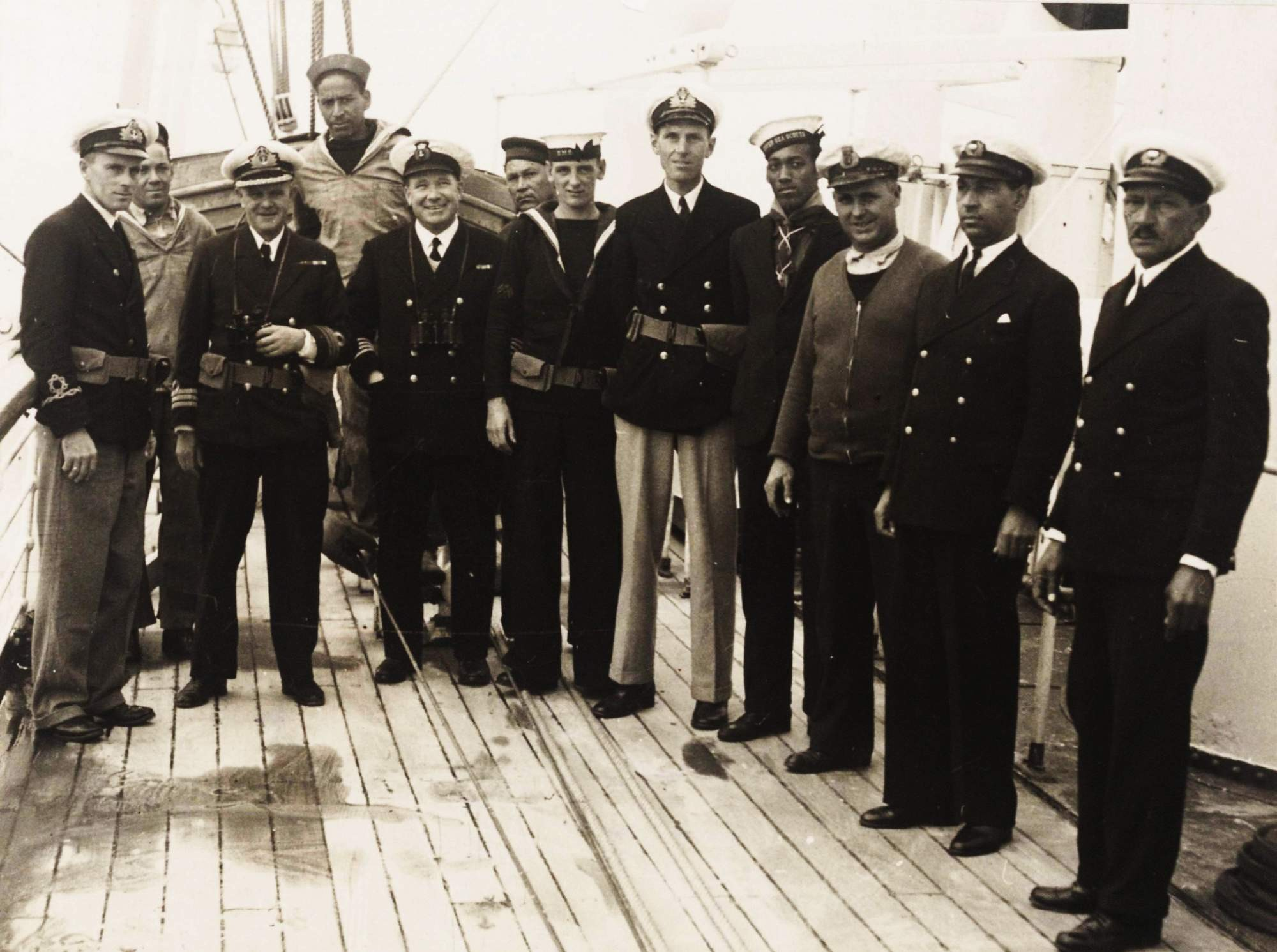
The crew of HMS Castle Harbour while in use as an examination vessel with the Royal Naval Examination Service

With the outbreak of the Second World War in 1939, Castle Harbour was taken over by the Examination Service of the Royal Navy as an examination vessel. Ships arriving at Bermuda were obliged to stop at Five-Fathom Hole, which had been designated the Examination Anchorage, this body of water lies just within the outer reefline, and ships can travel from it directly into St. George's Harbour. Ships could also follow Hurd's Channel around St. Catherine's Point to reach the Northern Lagoon, enclosed by the barrier reef. From there, they can enter the Great Sound, where the North America and West Indies Station anchorage was located, at Grassy Bay, east of the Royal Naval Dockyard on Ireland Island and west of Spanish Point on the Main Island, where the Admiralty House was located.

The Great Sound was also the landing area used by Royal Air Force and airline flying boats operating from Darrell's Island, and Fleet Air Arm seaplanes operating from the RNAS Boaz Island. As part of the destroyers-for-bases deal between the US and the UK which granted 99-year leases to the US on parts of the island, the US Navy began construction of a third flying boat air station, combined with naval docklands, called Naval Operating Base Bermuda, on the Great Sound, prior to the US entry into the war. During the course of the war, when Allied trans-Atlantic shipping was organised into convoys, Bermuda became a forming up point for convoys (coded BHX, these joined at sea with HX-coded convoys from Halifax to complete the passage to Europe), with large numbers of vessels anchoring on the Northern Lagoon and the Great Sound. From the Great Sound, ships could also reach Bermuda's main commercial port, the City of Hamilton, on Hamilton Harbour.

All of these sites (together with submarine cable stations, naval and commercial wireless stations, and other important facilities) were inviting targets for German naval vessels and their floatplanes, raiding parties, saboteurs, and spies. The Examination Service was tasked with sending a naval examiner along with the civil government pilot who would steer arriving vessels through the reefs. Only after the examiner had cleared the vessel would the pilot steer it inwards. St. David's Battery, on the cliffs of St. David's Head, was designated "Examination Battery" during the war, with its gunners ready to fire upon any vessel that attempted to move from the anchorage without authorisation. Castle Harbour, which at this point remained on the civil register, was used to deliver the naval examiner and civil government pilot to arriving ships.

== Royal Navy commission ==
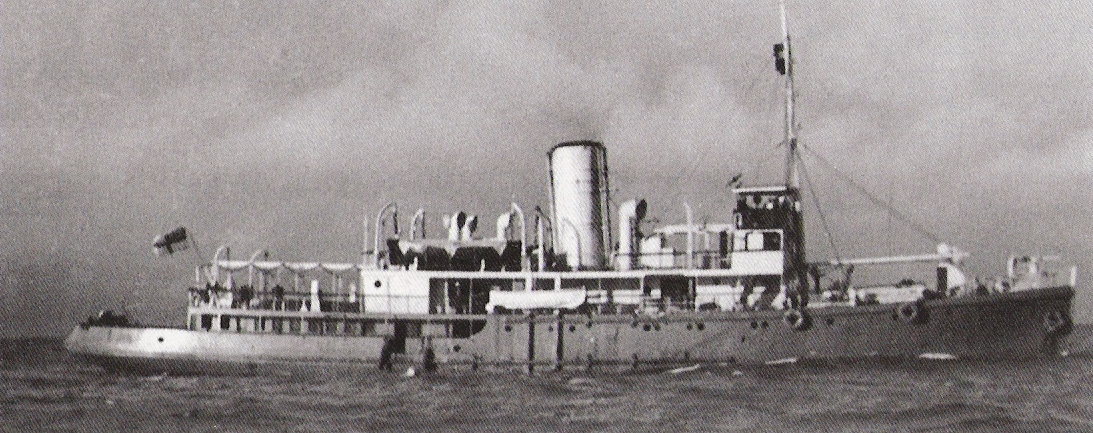
HMS Castle Harbour at sea

As the war progressed, and the threat of German u-boats became acute, Castle Harbour's role was expanded. She was refitted, armed with a 3-inch gun on the bow, four machine guns and sixteen depth charges, and commissioned as HMS Castle Harbour. Crewed mostly by local-service ratings, she was tasked with anti-submarine patrols within the reefline to prevent attacks like that carried out at Scapa Flow by the German u-boat U-47 on 14 October 1939. It was also thought German submarines might be used to land raiding parties, saboteurs, or spies. Outside the reefs, Charles Fairey's similarly converted yacht carried out anti-submarine patrols as HMS Evadne.

== Loss ==
Along with the new US Naval Operating Base, the United States Army Air Forces had established Kindley Field, and the US took over the ad-hoc anti-submarine air patrols for the UK. The US Army established its own garrison, which dwarfed the indigenous British garrison, and the US Navy also deployed its own vessels to patrol the ocean around Bermuda, (where USS Dynamic joined HMS Evadne by the end of 1942). HMS Sumar was also commissioned for harbour defence. The Royal Canadian Navy (RCN) also established the training facility HMCS Somers Isles. Bermuda became the working-up area where newly commissioned US Navy destroyers, as well as lend-lease destroyers obtained by the RN and the RCN, prepared and exercised before deployment.

With the concentration of Allied anti-submarine forces that had built-up in and over Bermuda's waters by late 1942, and the resultant diminished threat from enemy submarines inside the reefline, HMS Castle Harbour was deemed unnecessary at Bermuda and was consequently ordered to the Mediterranean. She was travelling as part of Convoy TRIN-19 from Trinidad, with a Merchant Navy crew, when at 2120 hours on 16 October 1942, she was torpedoed by the German submarine U-160. The explosion broke her in two and she sank within twenty seconds with the loss of nine of her twenty-two crewmembers.
