= Eric Bross =

American film director

Eric Bross is an American film director. Raised in West Caldwell, New Jersey, he was recognized at the New Jersey Young Filmmakers Festival at 16 and later studied film at Montclair State University. He has directed numerous films since 1995 and is best known for Restaurant (1998), the USA Network miniseries Traffic (2004), and Affairs of State, starring David Corenswet. He won the Directors Guild of America Award for Outstanding Directorial Achievement in Children's Programs for his work on the Nickelodeon film The Boy Who Cried Werewolf (2010).

== Early life and education ==
Eric Bross was born in 1964 in Newark, New Jersey, and raised in West Caldwell, New Jersey. At the age of 13, Bross received a Super 8 camera as a Christmas gift, and by age 16, he had won the top award at the New Jersey Young Filmmakers Festival. He studied film at Montclair State University, where in 1988 he met screenwriter Tom Cudworth during a class on director Woody Allen.

== Career ==
Bross made his feature directorial debut with the independent film Ten Benny (1998), which he co-wrote with Cudworth. The coming-of-age story, set along Bloomfield Avenue in New Jersey, follows a young shoe salesman who becomes entangled with mob loans and betrayal among friends. The film premiered at festivals in 1995 under the title Nothing to Lose and was praised for its bravura style and Adrien Brody's performance.
