= USS Hamilton (DD-141) =

Wickes-class destroyer

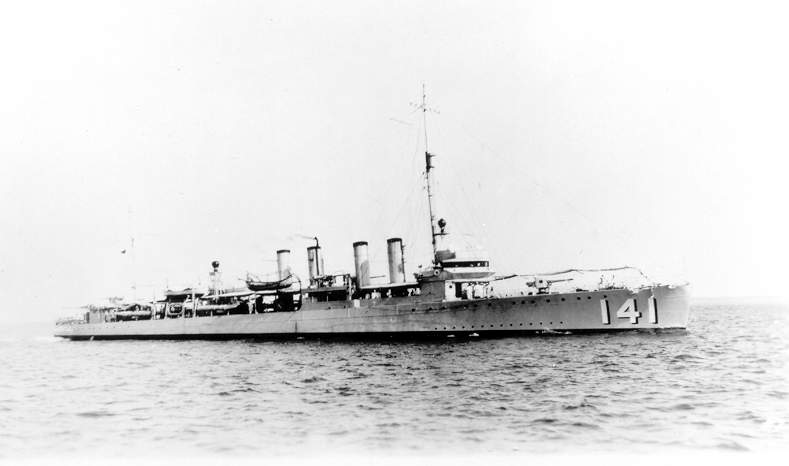
- USS Hamilton

History

United States
- Name: Hamilton
- Namesake: Lieutenant Archibald Hamilton
- Builder: Mare Island Navy Yard
- Laid down: 8 June 1918
- Launched: 15 January 1919
- Commissioned: 7 November 1919
- Decommissioned: 20 July 1922
- Identification: DD-141
- Recommissioned: 20 January 1930
- Decommissioned: 16 October 1945
- Reclassified: Fast minesweeper (DMS-18) 17 October 1941; Miscellaneous auxiliary (AG-111) 6 May 1945
- Stricken: 1 November 1945
- Fate: Sold for scrapping 21 November 1946

General characteristics
- Class & type: Wickes-class destroyer
- Displacement: 1,090 tons
- Length: 314 ft 5 in (95.8 m)
- Beam: 31 ft 9 in (9.7 m)
- Draft: 8 ft 8 in (2.6 m)
- Speed: 35 knots (65 km/h)
- Complement: 113 officers and enlisted
- Armament: 4 × 4 in (102 mm)/50 guns; 3 × .30 cal (7.62 mm) machine guns; 12 × 21 in (533 mm) torpedo tubes

The second USS Hamilton (DD-141) was a Wickes-class destroyer in the United States Navy following World War I, later reclassified DMS-18 for service in World War II.

== Namesake ==
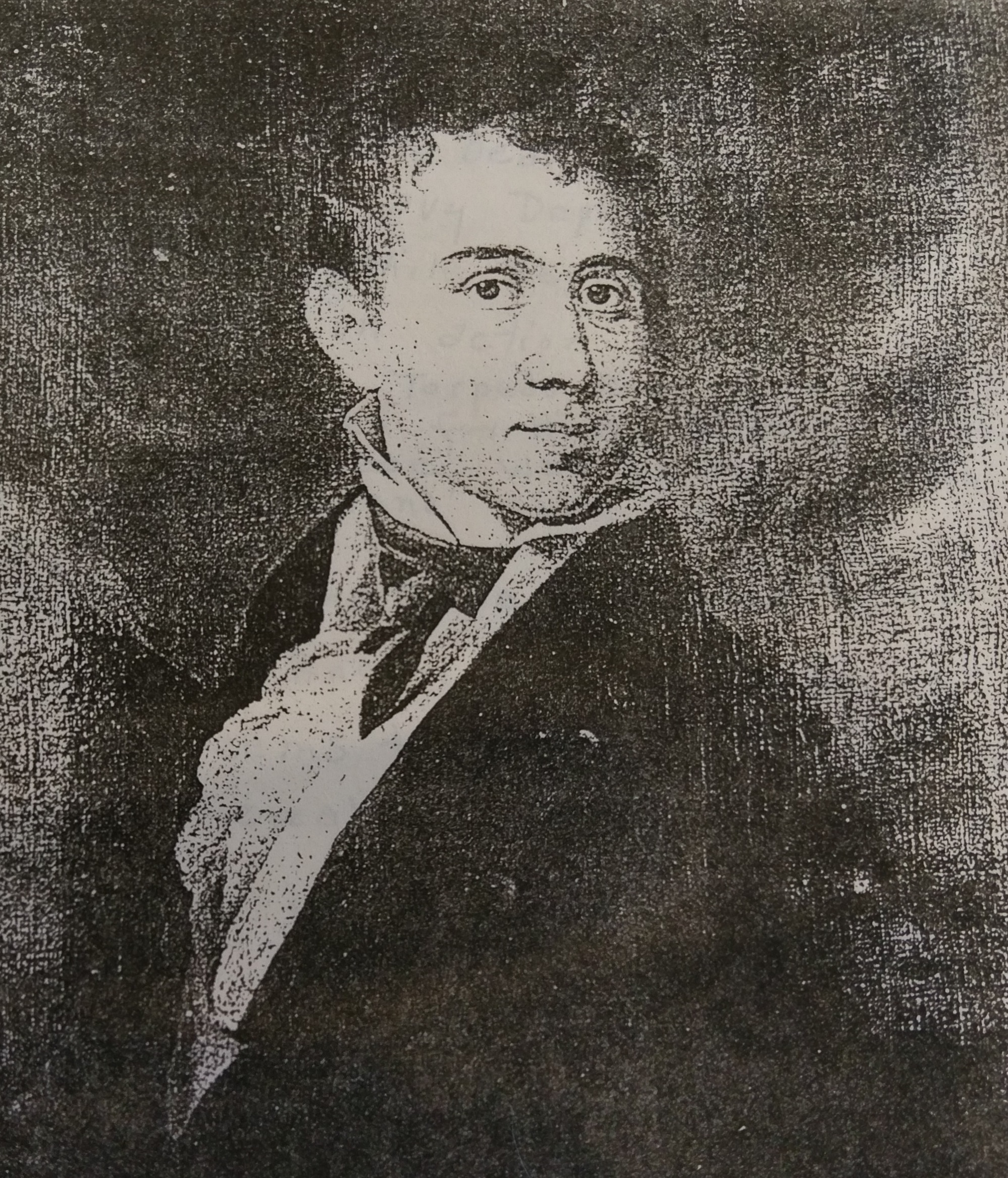
Lieutenant Archibald Hamilton

Archibald Hamilton was born c. 1790, the son of Secretary of the Navy Paul Hamilton. He was appointed Midshipman on 18 May 1809 and assigned to work with a new kind of hollow shot needed by frigate USS President. He next sailed for Europe on USS John Adams on 31 January 1811 carrying dispatches for American officers in the Mediterranean. On his return to the United States, Hamilton was assigned to USS United States on which he won commendation from his commanding officer, Captain Stephen Decatur, for gallantry in action during the capture of British frigate HMS Macedonian on 25 October 1812. Decatur selected him to bear the captured British flags to Washington.

Appointed Acting Lieutenant on 21 December 1812 and Lieutenant on 24 July 1813, Hamilton served throughout the War of 1812, only to be killed shortly after the Treaty of Ghent had formally ended the war. Because of the slow communications of the day, word of peace had not reached New York by 15 January 1815 when the frigate USS President, commanded by Captain Decatur and having Hamilton as one of her lieutenants, ran the blockade out of that port. The next day British men-of-war HMS Endymion, HMS Pomone and HMS Tenedos overtook and captured President after a long and bloody running fight in which Hamilton was killed. He was the last U.S. Navy officer to die in the War of 1812.

== Construction and commissioning ==
Hamilton was launched on 15 January 1919 by the Mare Island Naval Shipyard, sponsored by Miss Dolly Hamilton Hawkins, great-grand-niece of Archibald Hamilton. The ship was commissioned on 7 November 1919.

== Service history ==
Based at San Diego, Hamilton participated in battle practice and maneuvers along the California coast with Destroyer Squadron 17. In mid-1920 she also took part in torpedo and smoke screen operations in Hawaii. Battle practice and other readiness operations ranging across the Pacific to Hawaii continued until Hamilton decommissioned at San Diego on 20 July 1922.

Hamilton recommissioned on 20 January 1930 and, after shakedown, reached her new home port, Norfolk, on 26 November. She served with the Scouting Force, operating along the East Coast throughout 1931, and then returned to San Diego in January 1932. After a year of plane guard duty and battle exercises along the California coast, Hamilton again shifted to the East Coast, reaching Norfolk on 29 January 1933. Based at Newport, Rhode Island, she served with the Scouting Force in local operations and exercises.

In 1938 an activated-tank stabilization system designed by Nicolas Minorsky was tested in Hamilton but exhibited control stability problems. The outbreak of World War II in Europe in late 1939 interrupted further development as Hamilton was called to active duty. Hamilton joined other members of her class on the Grand Banks Patrol, which sent American ships as far north as Iceland and Greenland to protect their own and neutral shipping. Hamilton continued this duty until converted to a fast minesweeper in June 1941. Reclassified DMS-18 on 17 October 1941, she resumed patrol duty along the East Coast and into the North Atlantic.

=== World War II ===
When the United States was catapulted into the war on 7 December 1941, Hamilton's pace accelerated greatly. Wartime duties now took Hamilton on coastal convoys from New York through German U-boat-infested waters as far south as the Panama Canal Zone.

The Caribbean Sea and the waters off Cape Hatteras were particularly rich ground for U-boats, and Hamilton more than once attacked U-boats sighted on the surface or detected by sound contacts. On 9 June 1942 Hamilton rescued 39 survivors of USS Gannet, torpedoed just north of Bermuda.

The shifting tide of war drew Hamilton from the coastal convoy route in the fall of 1942 as she became part of "Operation Torch," the Allied invasion of North Africa. Hamilton sailed for North Africa on 24 October with Rear Admiral H. K. Hewitt's Task Force 34, a part of the Allied amphibious thrust. Two weeks later, she cruised off the Moroccan coast providing antisubmarine (ASW) protection and fire support for the first waves of invasion barges as the Allies landed at Casablanca, Oran, and Algiers on 8 November 1942.

Hamilton remained along the North African shore on minesweeping and escort duty out of Casablanca until December when she sailed for the Brooklyn Navy Yard, arriving 26 December. The following year saw Hamilton engaged primarily in coastal convoy duty, guiding and protecting merchantmen as they threaded their perilous way through German submarine packs from Iceland to the Caribbean.

Departing Norfolk on 3 December 1943, Hamilton transited the Panama Canal five days later and reached San Diego on 16 December. From San Diego she steamed to Pearl Harbor and, after a brief training period, sailed for Kwajalein Atoll, a key target in the Marshalls. As the Marines stormed ashore there on 31 January 1944, Hamilton steamed in the area to screen transports and provide the fire support that made it possible to land and stay.

After the successful conclusion of that invasion, Hamilton retired to Nouméa, New Caledonia, to prepare for the invasion of the Admiralty Islands. At Nouméa, Hamilton joined forces with three other destroyers converted to fast minesweepers-Hovey, Long, and Palmer—to form a preliminary sweep unit. It was the mission of these ships to enter enemy harbors three to five days before landings to clear out mines and provide safe anchorage for the invasion force. The toll of these operations, conducted before enemy shore batteries had been taken out, was high. Of her original unit only Hamilton survived the war.

Under enemy fire, Hamilton and her group entered Seeadler Harbor, Admiralty Islands on 2 March 1944 to begin sweeping operations. After the invasion was launched, she remained in the area screening transports and patrolling on ASW duty until early April when she returned to Nouméa to prepare for the invasion of Aitape. After sweeping operations there before the 22 April invasion, Hamilton served on general sweeping duty in the Solomons and then readied for the Mariana campaign.

Entering Saipan Harbor on 13 June, Hamilton helped clear the way for the invasion. The conquest of Saipan was followed by the assault on Guam. The day organized enemy resistance on Saipan ended, Hamilton sailed from Eniwetok on 9 July to take part in the preliminary bombardment and sweeping activities at Guam. This time a long period on the firing line preceded Hamilton's entrance into the harbor. Then three days before the invasion on 21 July, she started to sweep the harbor. After screening transports in the retirement area, Hamilton sailed to Pearl Harbor for repairs.

Hamilton's next tour of minesweeping duty fell at Peleliu Island. Arriving off the Palaus on 12 September 1944, Hamilton joined her unit and proceeded through several heavily mined channels. In Kossol Passage, the converted destroyers exploded 116 mines. For destroying three extensive minefields, which the Japanese had hoped would ward off or severely damage the invasion force, Hamilton and the other minesweepers received the Navy Unit Commendation. Then, after duty in the transport screen, she escorted convoys from the staging areas to the Palaus to prepare for the assault on the Philippine Islands.

She departed Manus on 10 October and entered Leyte Gulf on 17 September. Three days before Army divisions came ashore, Hamilton swept the channels around Diriagat Island and Looc Bay to clear the way to the invasion beaches. To add to the usual turmoil of the invasion, the fleet as a whole was under almost constant air attack. In the Battle of Leyte Gulf, the Imperial Japanese Navy was virtually annihilated; the Japanese lost three battleships, four carriers, six heavy and four light cruisers, and nine destroyers. American losses were two escort carriers, a light carrier, and three destroyers. This battle marked the end of Japanese sea power as an important threat. The fleet had cleared the way for the final assaults leading into Japan.

Arriving at Manus, Admiralty Islands on 31 October, Hamilton underwent availability and repairs and, once more ready for battle, sailed on 23 December to prepare the way for the invasion of Lingayen Gulf. As the minesweepers steamed through the channel on 6 January 1945, wave after wave of kamikazes attacked. Hamilton emerged from the kamikaze attacks unscathed. After the invasion forces landed at Lingayen Gulf on 9 January, Hamilton remained as a transport screen and escort until 1 February when she sailed for Saipan.

From Saipan, the veteran ship again steamed into battle, this time appearing off Iwo Jima. Hamilton recorded no casualties during sweeping operations which began on 16 February, but she had to aid Gamble, left powerless by a direct bomb hit on 18 February. In addition to helping the wounded ship fight myriad fires, Hamilton took on board and care for the more seriously injured sailors. After marines stormed ashore on Iwo Jima on 19 February, Hamilton patrolled off the island until on 27 February. The four-stacker then returned to Iwo Jima as a convoy escort 7 March. Three days later Hamilton sailed from the battle and from the Pacific War. Steaming for Eniwetok, she changed course to rescue 11 men from a downed Boeing B-29 Superfortress aircraft on 11 March.

Hamilton reached Pearl Harbor via Eniwetok on 25 March 1945 and, after a brief period of training, headed back to the continental United States. As she sailed under the Golden Gate Bridge on 8 April, the destroyer ended over 100,000 miles of steaming in the Pacific. Scheduled for overhaul and modernization, she went into drydock at Richmond, California; but she was subsequently reclassified AG-111 (miscellaneous auxiliary) on 6 May 1945 and taken out of dry dock. The ship spent the few remaining months of the war participating in experimental minesweeping work along the California coast out of Santa Barbara. Two weeks before the Japanese surrender, Hamilton sailed to the destroyer base at San Diego, where she was decommissioned on 16 October 1945. Her hulk was sold to Hugo Neu of New York City for scrapping on 21 November 1946.

== Awards ==
Hamilton earned nine battle stars for World War II service.
