= Tom Cudworth =

American screenwriter

Tom Cudworth (born February 15, 1964) is an American screenwriter.

Cudworth grew up in an Italian neighborhood in Bloomfield, New Jersey. After studying filmmaking at Montclair State College, Cudworth co-wrote his first film with Eric Bross, entitled Ten Benny, in 1994. The film featured one of Adrien Brody's first leading roles, and premiered at the Sundance Film Festival in 1996.

Cudworth's follow-up film Restaurant garnished critical praise, and was released at the Los Angeles Independent Film Festival on April 17, 1998. Restaurant starred Adrien Brody, Elise Neal, David Moscow, Simon Baker, Malcolm-Jamal Warner, and Lauryn Hill (who performed in Restaurant while pregnant). In 2000, Adrien Brody received an Independent Spirit Award nomination for his role as Chris Calloway in Restaurant.
