= SS Westmoreland (1916) =

Refrigerated steam merchant

History

United Kingdom
- Name: SS Westmoreland
- Namesake: Westmorland, Northwest England
- Owner: Federal Steam Navigation Co Ltd, London
- Operator: New Zealand Shipping Company, London
- Route: Wellington - Colón - Liverpool
- Builder: D. & W. Henderson & Co Ltd, Glasgow
- Yard number: 492
- Launched: 29 November 1916
- Completed: 1917
- In service: April 1917
- Out of service: 1 June 1942
- Identification: UK official number 140292; Call sign GLZP
- Fate: Sunk, 1 June 1942

General characteristics
- Tonnage: 9,512 GRT
- Length: 473 ft (144 m)
- Beam: 60 ft (18 m)
- Draught: 36.75 ft (11.20 m)
- Installed power: 918 NHP
- Propulsion: 4 × steam turbines SR geared to dual shafts, 2 screws, 5 single boilers, 20 corrugated furnaces
- Speed: 15 knots (28 km/h; 17 mph)
- Crew: 68

SS Westmoreland was a refrigerated steam merchant of the United Kingdom originally built in 1917 by D. & W. Henderson & Co Ltd, in Glasgow, Scotland, for Federal Steam Navigation Co. of London.

== Construction & service ==
Acquired by her owners in April 1917, Westmoreland was placed in service on the Wellington - Colón, Liverpool route as a general cargo carrier. She had a very active career during World War II prior to her loss, taking part in almost 50 convoys, calling in ports all over the world including Adelaide, Wellington, Haifa, Curacao, New York, and Glasgow.

On 29 January 1941, while departing Glasgow bound for Liverpool and ultimately New Zealand, Westmoreland struck two German naval mines. Initially, the crew was taken off by HMS Wild Swan. However, at the captain's orders they returned once it became clear that Westmoreland would not immediately sink. Despite substantial flooding and rough conditions, the stricken vessel was successfully towed to Liverpool, where she arrived on 31 January.

=== Final voyage and loss ===
Westmoreland departed Wellington, New Zealand on 26 April 1942, under the command of Captain Ernst Arthur Burton with a cargo of mail, foodstuffs, and wool. She reached Balboa, the Pacific Ocean entrance to the Panama Canal on 22 May, where she transited the canal and then spent a few days at Colón on the Caribbean side before setting sail on the 25th bound for Halifax, where she was to join an eastbound convoy for Liverpool. On the morning of 1 June, under a bright gibbous moon 510 nautical miles (940 km; 590 mi) south of Halifax, Westmoreland was zig-zagging her way north in heavy seas. Here they crossed paths with the German submarine U-566, which spotted the large merchant vessel about 4,000 feet (1,200 m) away. The submarine's next course change placed her in a nearly perfect firing position. At 1:50AM local time, a torpedo fired by U-566 struck forward of amidships, killing three men. The Westmoreland quickly began losing headway. Though none of the lookouts reported sighting a submarine it was clear they had been torpedoed; confidential materials were destroyed as a precaution and an emergency transmission with their position sent.

Following a tour of his ship, Captain Burton noted significant damage to the port boat deck and broken beams on the hatch for hold #3. That information, combined with flooding in the engineering spaces and loss of power, convinced him it was probable his vessel would sink and thus he ordered 'Abandon Ship'. Three lifeboats were launched, carrying 65 men away from the slowly sinking freighter. According to the logs of U-566, a coup-de-grâce torpedo was fired about 40 minutes after the initial attack, at 2:32AM, and struck near 40 yards (37 m) from the stern. Even this failed to sink Westmoreland, however, causing U-566's commanding officer to order the target shelled.

The submarine expended 60 rounds from two deck guns, starting large fires aboard. Despite this the merchant ship refused to sink until finally, just after 6AM, she rolled to starboard and went under. Burton kept the trio of lifeboats together at first, hoping rescue craft had been dispatched in response to Westmoreland's distress signal, but when help did not arrive by 1PM the following day he ordered they make for land, rowing to the northwest, despite rough conditions and a 25-knot (46 km/h; 29 mph) wind. Two boats became separated from the third, which contained Captain Burton. These were rescued on 3 June by the Canadian steamer SS Cathcart, which landed the survivors at Halifax on 6 June. The third boat was not rescued until 6 June when the US-flagged steamship SS Henry R. Mallory happened across them, landing its occupants at New York on 8 June.
