= Ten Benny =

- Directed by: Eric Bross
- Written by: Eric Bross; Tom Cudworth
- Produced by: Eric Bross; H.M. Coakley
- Starring: Adrien Brody
- Cinematography: Horacio Marquínez
- Edited by: Keith Reamer
- Music by: Chris Hajian
- Distributed by: BMG Independents
- Release date: November 13, 1998
- Running time: 108 minutes
- Country: United States
- Language: English

Ten Benny, also known as Nothing to Lose, is a 1995 American drama film directed by Eric Bross and starring Adrien Brody.

== Plot ==
Ray has a tip on the races that he's sure will turn a borrowed ten grand into a hundred. But when Ray's horse comes up short, he finds himself on the run from the mob and his girlfriend in the arms of his best friend.

== Reception ==
It has 44% rating and 9 reviews on Rotten Tomatoes.
