= Al Donahue =

- Born: June 12, 1904; Dorchester, Massachusetts, U.S.
- Died: February 20, 1983 (aged 78); Fallbrook, California, U.S.
- Occupation: Big band leader
- Instrument: Violin

Al Donahue (June 12, 1904, Dorchester, Massachusetts - February 20, 1983, Fallbrook, California) was an American violinist and big band leader.

Donahue got his start playing in Boston-area campus bands and led a band at Boston's Weber Duck Inn in 1925. The ensemble attracted enough notice to obtain engagements at Florida hotels; one of these, the Bermudiana, contracted with Donahue to set up bands to play at all its hotels, as well as onboard Eastern Steamship ocean liners. During the mid-1930s he substituted for Ray Noble as leader at the Rainbow Room of Rockefeller Center. Over time he moved from playing sweet pop music to swing music and toured nationally. He took an engagement at the Palladium in Hollywood immediately after Glenn Miller's departure. Paula Kelly, Dee Keating, Lynne Stevens, Phil Brito, and Snooky Lanson all served as vocalists in his ensemble at times.

Donahue recorded copiously between 1935 and 1942, recording for Decca Records, Vocalion, and Okeh. His biggest hit was a rendition of "Jeepers Creepers", which went to #1 on the Billboard chart in 1938. He also later recorded for University Recording Company.

After World War II he moved the ensemble again toward light music, playing throughout the West Coast and appearing in films such as Sweet Genevieve. Later, he would return to cruise ships once more, directing music for the Furness Bermuda Line; from 1950 to 1963 he played on the Queen of Bermuda and the Ocean Monarch. He opened a record store in Bermuda, but the government took the store over, forcing Donahue to abandon the business. Following this, he settled in Oceanside, California, where he ran a store called Ponzi's House of Music until his death.
