= SS Veendam (1922) =

Dutch-owned transatlantic liner that was a German accommodation ship in WW2

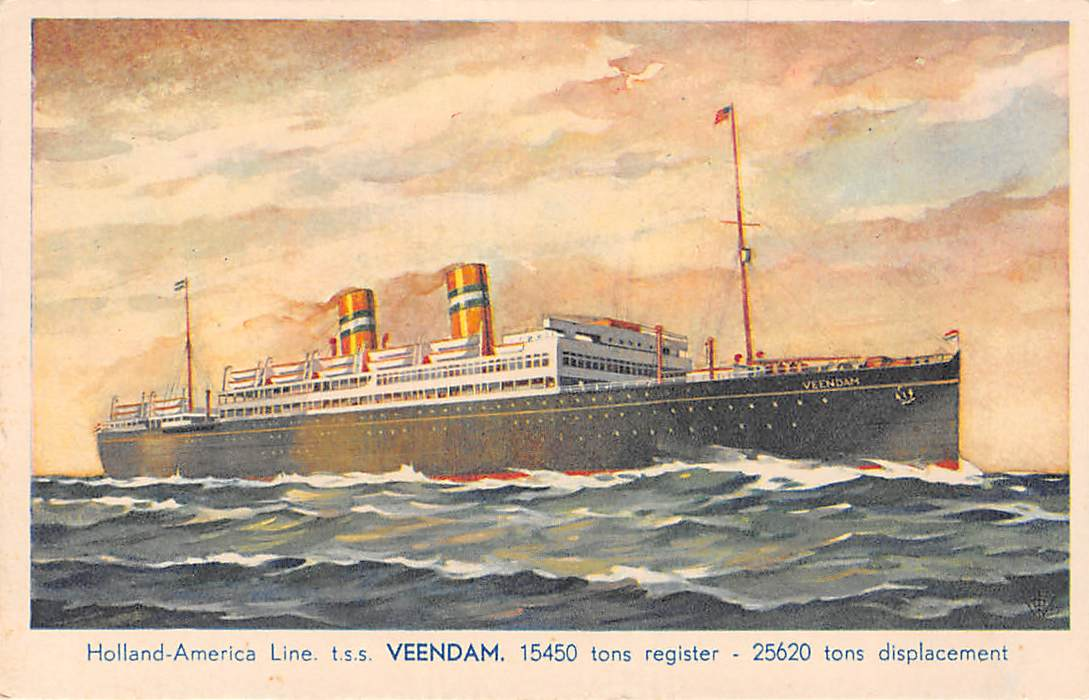
- Postcard of Veendam

History

Netherlands
- Name: 1922: Veendam; 1942: Marinestützpunkt Tollerort; 1947: Veendam
- Namesake: Veendam
- Owner: NASM
- Operator: 1923: Holland America Line; 1941: Hamburg America Line; 1947: Holland America Line
- Port of registry: Rotterdam
- Route: 1923: Rotterdam – Hoboken; 1930: New York – Hamilton; 1931: Rotterdam – Hoboken; 1939: Antwerp – Hoboken; 1947: Rotterdam – Hoboken
- Builder: Harland & Wolff, Govan
- Yard number: 650
- Launched: 18 November 1922
- Completed: 29 March 1923
- Maiden voyage: 18 April 1923
- Refit: 1928, 1931, 1941, 1946
- Identification: until 1933: code letters PWBG; by 1934: call sign PIEP
- Fate: Scrapped in 1953

General characteristics
- Type: ocean liner
- Tonnage: 15,450 GRT, 9,202 NRT, 13,503 DWT
- Displacement: 25,620 tons
- Length: 575.0 ft (175.3 m) overall; 550.2 ft (167.7 m) registered
- Beam: 67.3 ft (20.5 m)
- Draught: 32 ft 5 in (9.9 m)
- Depth: 41.1 ft (12.5 m)
- Decks: 2
- Installed power: 1,913 NHP, 8,000 bhp
- Propulsion: 4 × steam turbines; single-reduction gearing; 2 × screws
- Speed: 15 knots (28 km/h)
- Capacity: cargo: 483,000 cu ft (13,700 m^{3}) grain; 452,000 cu ft (12,800 m^{3}) bale; passengers: 1923: 262 × 1st class, 436 × 2nd class, 1,200 × 3rd class; 1928: 262 × 1st class, 430 × 2nd class, 480 × tourist class; 1931: 263 × 1st class, 633 × tourist class, 555 × 3rd class; 1947: 223 × 1st class, 363 × tourist class
- Crew: 1923: 328; 1947: 227
- Sensors & processing systems: 1924: submarine signalling; 1930: wireless direction finding
- Notes: sister ship: Volendam

SS Veendam was a Dutch-owned transatlantic liner, launched in Scotland in 1922 and scrapped in the United States in 1953. She was part of the first generation of turbine-powered steamships in the Holland America Line (Nederlandsch-Amerikaansche Stoomvaart Maatschappij, or NASM) fleet. Veendam and her sister ship Volendam were NASM's largest turbine steamships until the flagship Statendam was completed in 1929.

In the 1920s and 30s, Veendam spent most of her career on scheduled services between Rotterdam and Hoboken, New Jersey. She also operated seasonal cruises, usually from Hoboken to the Caribbean. In summer 1934 she made two cruises from Rotterdam to destinations in Europe, and early in 1938 she cruised from New Orleans to the Caribbean.

In the Second World War she evacuated refugees from Europe, until in 1940 she was captured in the German invasion of the Netherlands. In 1941 the Kriegsmarine requisitioned Veendam as an accommodation ship. Between 1943 and 1945 she was damaged in several air raids, and sank at her moorings. She was raised in 1945, refitted in 1946, and returned to NASM transatlantic and cruising service in 1947. She was withdrawn from service and scrapped in 1953.

This was the second NASM ship to be named after the town of Veendam in Groningen. The first was the White Star Liner Baltic, which NASM bought and renamed in 1888. NASM next used the name in 1972, when it bought and renamed the turbine steamship Argentina.

== Building ==
In 1922 Harland & Wolff launched two liners at its shipyard in Govan, Glasgow, for NASM. Volendam was launched on 6 July 1922, and completed on 12 October that year. Her sister Veendam was built on slipway number 4 as yard number 650, launched on 18 November 1922, and completed on 29 March 1923.

Veendam's lengths were 575.0 ft (175.3 m) overall and 550.2 ft (167.7 m) registered. Her beam was 67.3 ft (20.5 m) and her depth was 32.6 ft (9.9 m). Her tonnages were 15,450 GRT, 9,202 NRT and 13,503 DWT. As built, she had berths for 1,898 passengers: 262 in first class, 436 in second class, and 1,200 in third class. Her holds had capacity for 483,000 cubic feet (13,700 m^{3}) of grain, or 452,000 cubic feet (12,800 m^{3}) of baled cargo.

The ship had two screws and four Brown–Curtis turbines: two high-pressure and two low-pressure. Each screw was driven by one high-pressure and one low-pressure turbine via single-reduction gearing. Her nine water-tube boilers were oil-fuelled, and supplied steam to her high-pressure turbines at 215 psi. The combined power of her four turbines was rated at 1,913 NHP or 8,000 bhp, and gave her a speed of 15 knots (28 km/h). She had two funnels, but the after one was a dummy.

One of the ship's saloons was decorated with a large painting of the Oude Verlaat in the town of Veendam. Veendam's town council presented the new ship with a certificate and a panoramic photograph of the town centre.

NASM registered Volendam at Rotterdam. Her code letters were PWBG.

== Early years ==
Veendam began her maiden voyage from Rotterdam on 18 April 1923, and arrived in Hoboken with 133 passengers on 28 April. Her regular toute was via Boulogne and Plymouth.

On the evening of 7 September 1924, on a westbound voyage, one of Veendam's first class passengers, Arthur Dearth, was lost overboard. No-one saw him fall, and the alarm was not raised until later, when his wife, who was travelling with him, reported him missing.

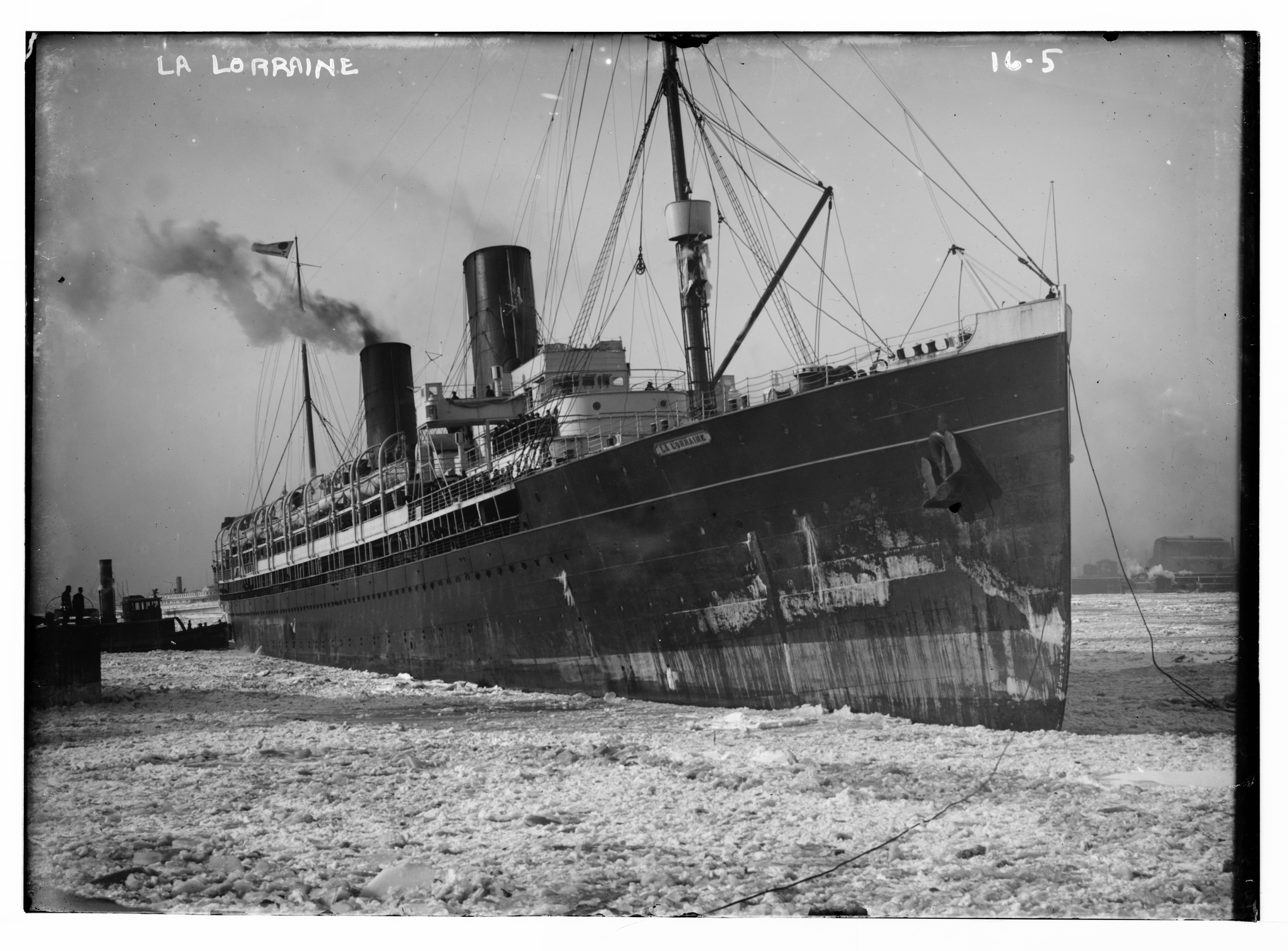
The CGT liner La Lorraine

On the morning of 13 June 1925, on an eastbound voyage, a young woman passenger, Elizabeth Cromwell, was seen to fall or jump overboard from Veendam's starboard side. The ship immediately turned around, and a search was made for 90 minutes, but she was never found. Cromwell was a second cousin of twins Dorothea and Gladys Cromwell, who took their own lives by jumping from the CGT liner La Lorraine together in January 1919. However, it was reported that Elizabeth did not know her cousins.

== Two collisions ==
On 17 February 1926, Veendam left Hoboken carrying 400 passengers on a cruise to the Caribbean, calling at ports in the West Indies and Central America. Early in 1927 she made at least two more cruises to the West Indies. The second left Hoboken on 17 February.

At 04:40 hrs on 15 July 1927, Veendam was in fog about 5 nautical miles (9 km) east of the Nantucket Lightship when she was involved in a collision with the Norwegian cargo steamship Sagaland. One seaman on Sagaland was killed, 20 of the crew scrambled aboard Veendam, and two of the liner's lifeboats rescued four members of Sagaland's crew from the water. Veendam's 164 passengers promptly donated more than US$1,000 to a fund, which it was reported would probably be given to the family of the dead seaman. Veendam landed survivors at Hoboken on 16 July.

On 10 December 1927, Veendam left Hoboken carrying $4 million in gold to the Netherlands. The bullion was being moved because the Dutch guilder had risen to a record high price against the United States dollar.

On 17 March 1928, Veendam left Hoboken for a cruise to the West Indies. Also in 1928, her passenger accommodation was revised. She still had 262 berths in first class, and second class was only slightly reduced to 430, but her third class accommodation was replaced with 480 tourist class berths.

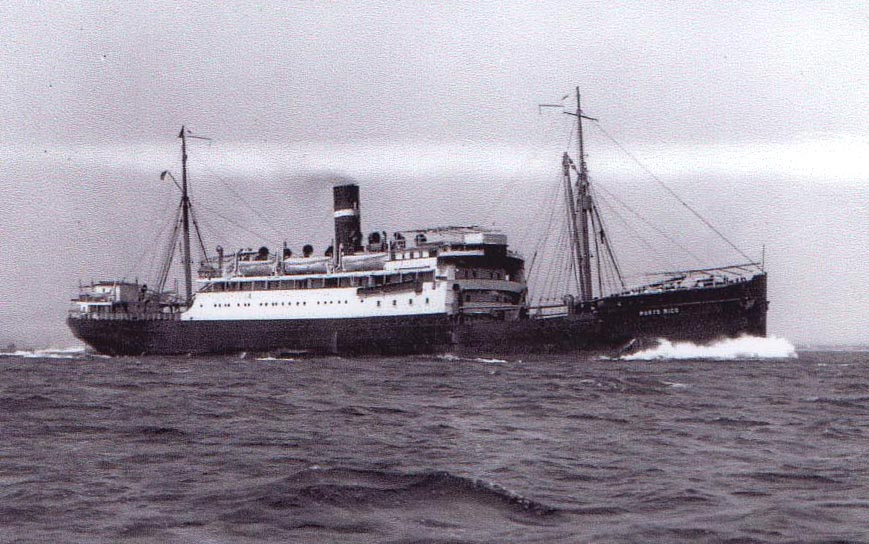
Porto Rico accidentally rammed Veendam on 20 May 1928

On 19 May 1928, Veendam left Hoboken with 700 passengers on her usual route to Rotterdam via Plymouth and Boulogne. But New York harbour was fog-bound that day and the next, and ten ships were involved in collisions. At 09:00 hrs on 19 May, the Isthmian Steamship Company cargo ship Anniston City collided with the Red Star Liner Pennland. Veendam stopped and anchored because of the fog, but at either 13:13 or 13:30 hrs the Porto Rico Line ship Porto Rico struck her port side, flooding Veendam's engine room. Veendam remained at anchor until midnight, and then returned to Hoboken, well down by the stern. At 15:14 hrs two coastal liners collided: Jefferson ramming Mohawk. At 01:08 hrs the next morning, the Atlantic Transport Liner Minnewaska collided with the United Fruit Company refrigerated cargo ship La Maria. Also, a schooner and a tug collided in Long Island Sound.

Back in Hoboken, Veendam disembarked her passengers, the Merritt-Chapman salvage tug Chapman Brothers pumped out her engine room, and then Veendam discharged her cargo. On 28 May Veendam went to Robins Dry Dock and Repair Company for repair. She returned to service on 16 June, leaving Hoboken for Rotterdam.

== Cavalry horses and storm damage ==
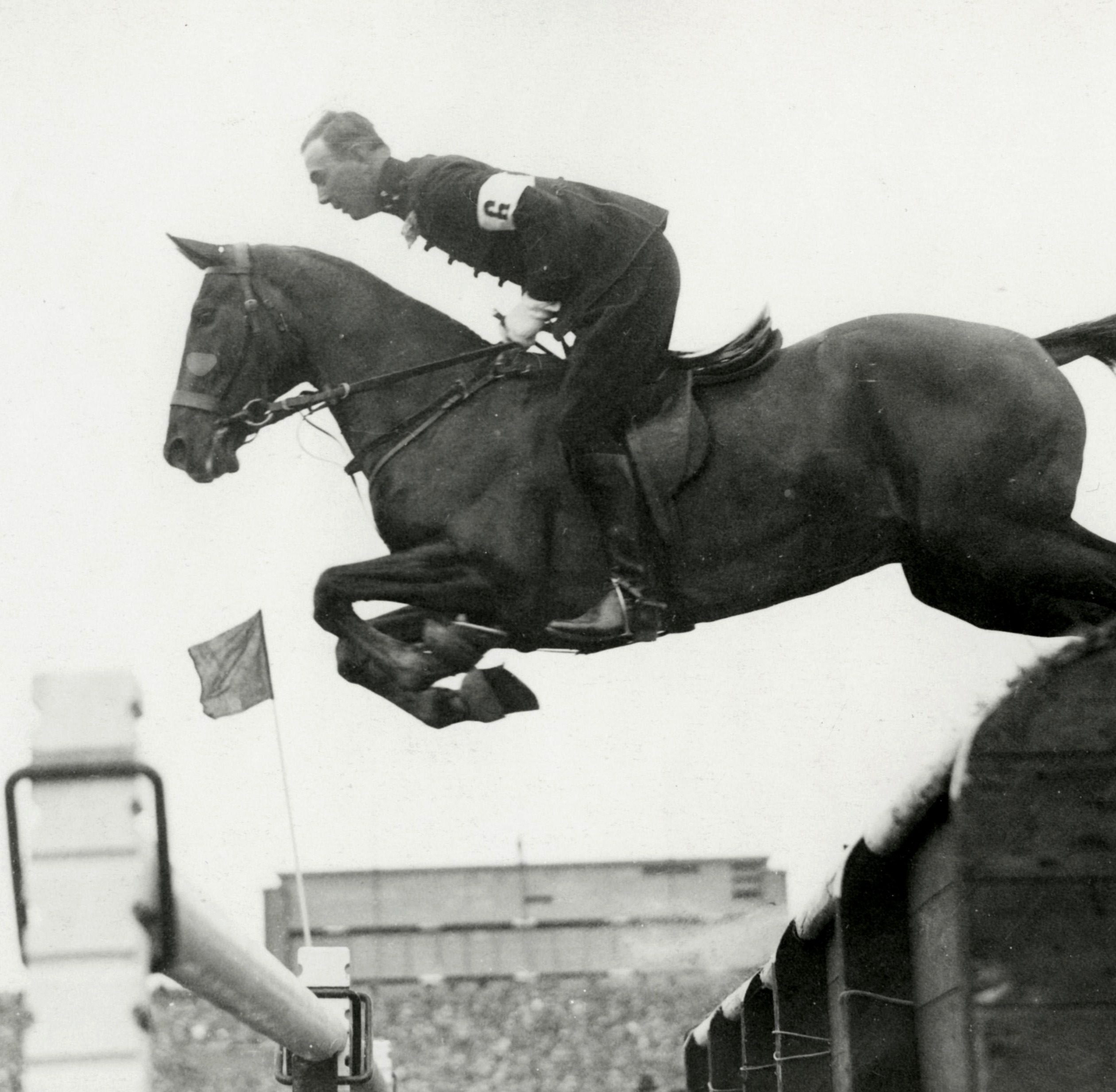
Ritmeester Antonius Colenbrander on his horse Gaga at the 1928 Summer Olympics in Amsterdam. He and his horse were members of the Dutch army cavalry team that travelled to the 1928 National Horse Show aboard Veendam later that year.

On 28 October 1928, Veendam arrived at Hoboken carrying the Royal Netherlands Army team on its way to the National Horse Show. The ship was temporarily equipped with padded stalls for the team's six cavalry horses.

On 11 February 1929, Veendam left Hoboken on a Caribbean cruise. It included calls at Santiago de Guayaquil on 20 February, Cristóbal, Colón on 24 February, La Guaira on 1 March, and Kingston, Jamaica on 2 March, and got back to Hoboken on 13 March.

On 24 September 1929, Veendam ran aground off the Hook of Holland. Helped by tugs, she was refloated after three hours. She was reported to be undamaged, and reached Rotterdam under her own power.

By 1930 Veendam was equipped with wireless direction finding. On 30 January 1930, on a westbound crossing, a storm hit her with high wind. For a time, the ship heeled over by 45 degrees. A wave 80 to 100 feet (24 to 30 m) high swept equipment off her decks, tore lifeboats from their davits, and severely damaged a deck house and her bridge. Her new wireless direction finder, and a section of her promenade rail, were swept away. Five crew members and two passengers were injured. Her third class accommodation was flooded, with water 4 feet (1 m) deep in the dining saloon. Ropes and gear blocked a passageway, trapping 60 people in the smoking saloon.

Veendam hove to for 26 hours for temporary repairs, during which time she drifted 69 nautical miles (128 km) off course. She reached Hoboken on 7 February, and a team of 200 engineers, fitters and other shipyard workers worked on the ship at the pier in Hoboken to complete repairs in time for her to begin a Caribbean cruise on 10 February.

== Bermuda charter ==
Furness Bermuda Line's Bermuda was Veendam's running-mate between New York and Hamilton, Bermuda.

On 26 February 1930, Furness Bermuda Line announced that it would charter Veendam for 12 months, starting that July. She would be a running-mate for Bermuda on the twice-weekly service between New York and Hamilton, Bermuda. Her funnels were repainted in Furness Bermuda Line colours, and she flew Furness Bermuda Line's house flag. Her first sailing on the route was on 2 July, and was fully booked.

In June 1931, just before Veendam's charter was due to end, her running-mate Bermuda was badly damaged by fire. Furness Bermuda Line extended Veendam's charter until November 1931, when the new Monarch of Bermuda was completed. She completed her last crossing from Bermuda back to New York on 9 November, was returned to NASM the next day, and left New York on 14 November to be dry docked in Rotterdam.

Wilton-Fijenoord refitted her passenger accommodation. There were still 263 berths in first class, but there were now 633 in tourist class and 555 in third class. Veendam was due to return to Hoboken in December 1931 to make cruises to the West Indies and Bermuda, but her refit continued into the New Year, and she did not reach Hoboken again until 20 January 1932. She was to make a seven-day cruise to Bermuda, including three days in port in Hamilton. The minimum fare was to be $65. She continued making cruises that season until at least 10 March 1932.

On 10 June 1932, Veendam left Hoboken on an eastbound transatlantic crossing. Her passengers included 250 pilgrims to the Eucharistic Congress in Dublin, and she was scheduled to make a special call at Cobh for them to disembark. Several NASM ships had been built in Ireland, but this was the first time one was to visit the island while in passenger service.

== Seamen's strike ==
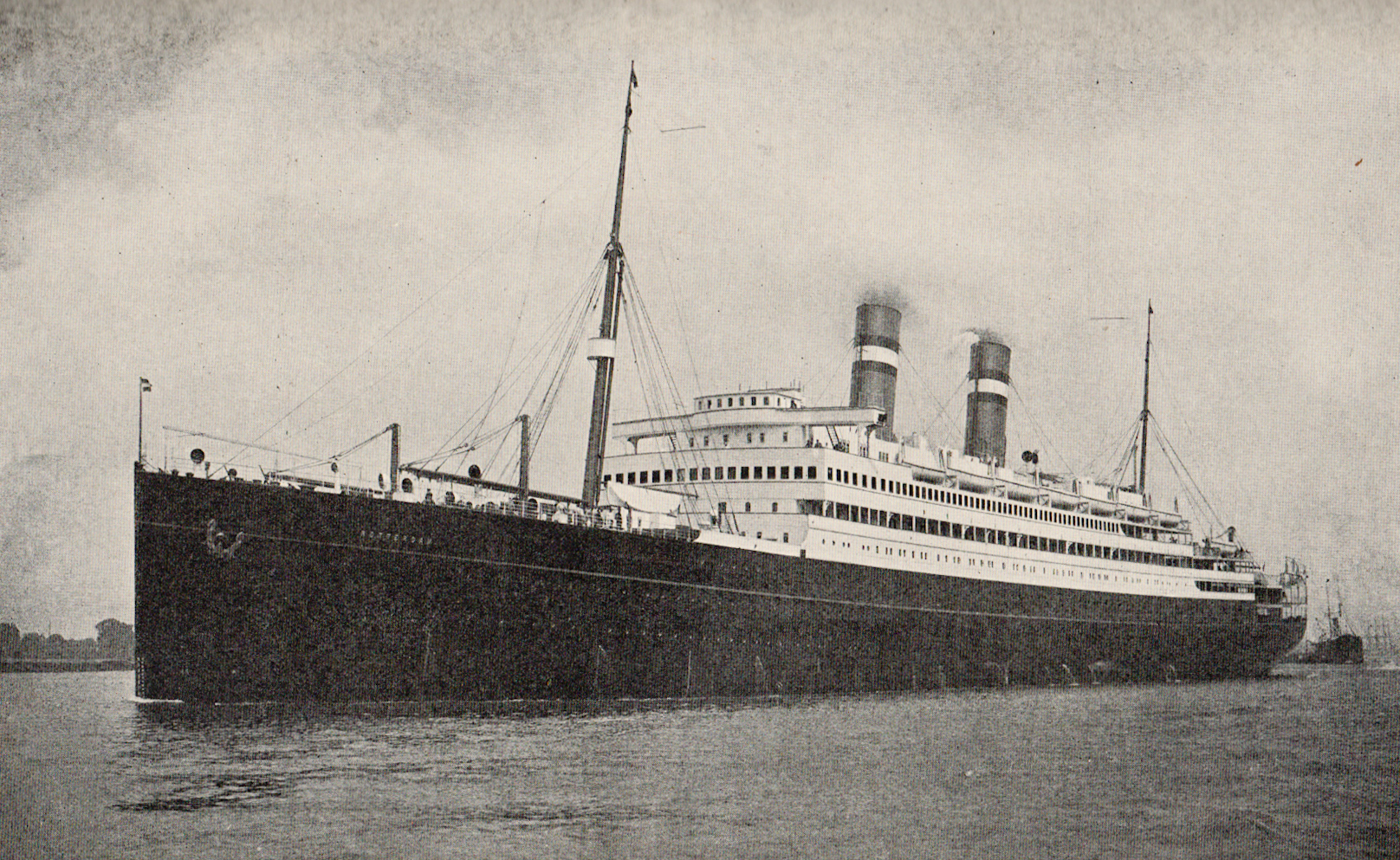
Rotterdam, which was caught in a seamen's strike in the port of Rotterdam in 1932. NASM failed to prevent the strike from spreading to Veendam.

At the beginning of September 1932, members of the Bond voor Minder Marine Personeel (BMMP) trade union working for most Dutch shipping lines struck for better wages. As the NASM liner Rotterdam left Boulogne on 4 September on a westbound crossing, her ships' stokers demanded that she terminate her voyage and return to Rotterdam. Her Master anchored her near the West Hinder lightvessel, where a detachment of 30 Dutch Marines boarded the ship from a pilot boat. The ship returned to Rotterdam, where 11 members of her crew were arrested for mutiny. On 7 September, NASM announced that it would not re-hire 400 BMMP members.

Veendam was on an eastbound crossing, about a week behind Rotterdam. On 11 September, NASM announced that Veendam would avoid the port of Rotterdam, in an attempt to prevent her crew from joining the dispute. She would land all her passengers at Boulogne, then discharge her cargo at Southampton, and embark westbound passengers firstly at Boulogne and then at Southampton. However, by the next day NASM had backed down, and allowed Veendam to complete her voyage to Rotterdam.

On 15 September some shipping lines reached an agreement with the BMMP, oncluding reinstatement of the 400 members that NASM had dismissed, but BMMP members at Rotterdam voted to reject it. However, the "contact commission" between the shipping companies and the BMMP established that an aggregate of the votes from the separate mass meetings at Amsterdam and Rotterdam produced a majority in favour of returning to work. Veendam resumed service. She left Rotterdam on 17 September, and was expected to reach Hoboken on 28 September.

In the early months of 1933, Veendam cruised as usual. A cruise to Bermuda, which she was due to start from Hoboken on 14 April, was reduced from eight days to seven, and NASM reduced its fares accordingly.

By 1934, the wireless telegraph call sign PIEP had replaced Volendam's code letters. In 1934 she was scheduled to make two summer cruises from Rotterdam: one of 11 days in July to Norway and Iceland, and one of ten days in August to Spain and Portugal.

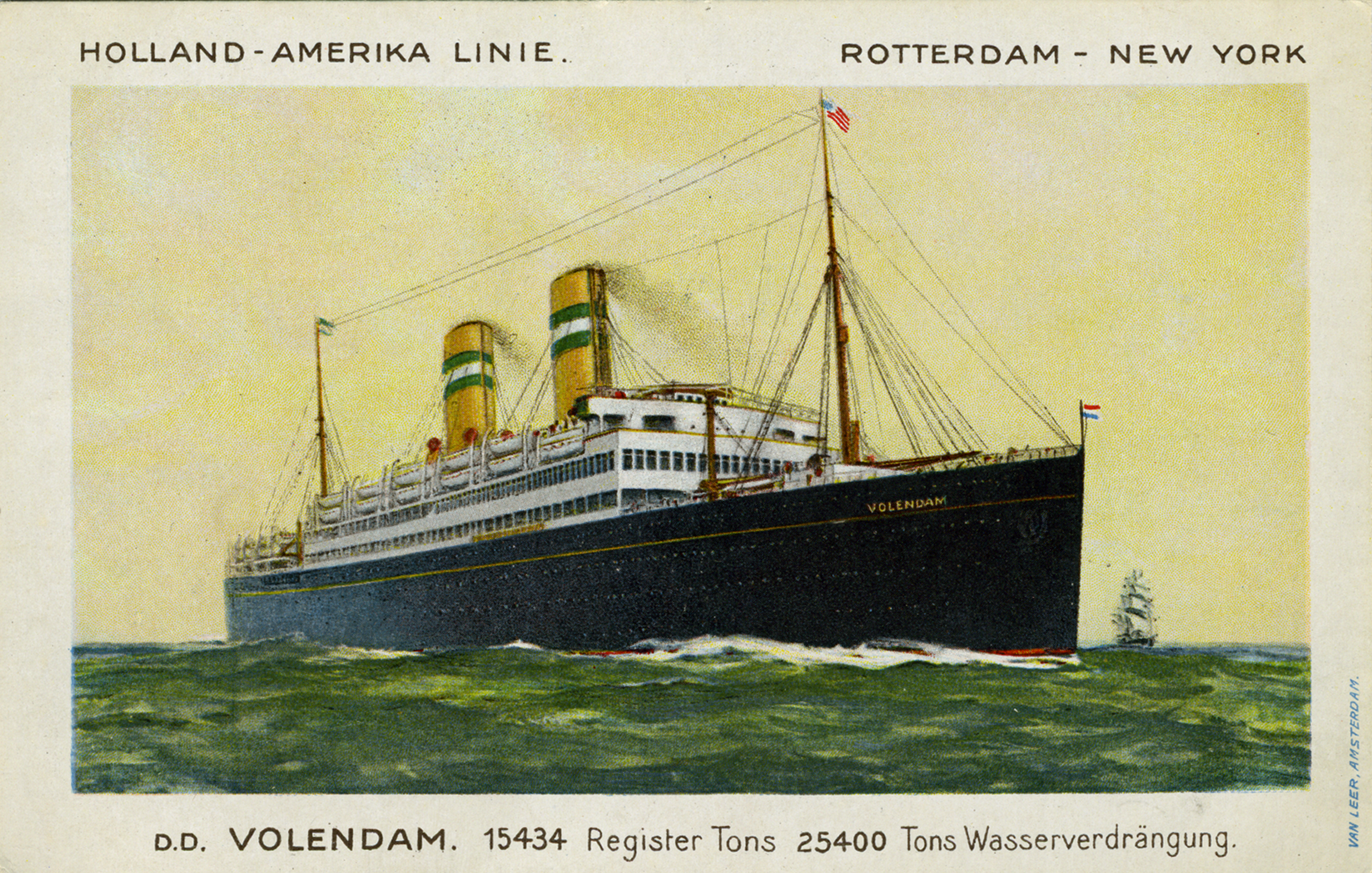
Veendam's sister ship Volendam. There was a rare meeting of the two ships in March 1935 in Hoboken

Veendam and her sister Volendam were rarely in the same port at the same time. One exception was on 16 March 1935 in Hoboken, when Veendam arrived from Rotterdam in the morning, and Volendam was already in port, waiting to start a short cruise a week later. Rotterdam, Edam and the cargo steamship Beemsterdijk were also at Hoboken on the same day. It was rare for five NASM ships to be in the same port on the same day.

== Cabin class ==
In January 1936 HAL reclassified Rotterdam, Volendam and Veendam as "cabin class" ships. Volendam and Veendam's one-way fares were reduced from $149.50 to $141.50 in the summer season, and from $142.50 to $134 in the off-season. HAL was the last major shipping line to adopt cabin class.

On 3 April 1936, three teenage boys from Kips Bay, Manhattan, stowed away on Veendam in the mistaken belief that she was going to Brazil. They were discovered the next day, and NASM at first said that the boys would be landed at Plymouth, where the US Consul would arrange their return. Veendam's Master made them do three hours' work a day until 6 April, when Veendam met Beemsterdijk in mid-Atlantic. Beemsterdijk was westbound to Hoboken, so the three stowaways were transferred by motor launch from Veendam to the cargo ship. Beemsterdijk landed the boys back at Hoboken on 10 April.

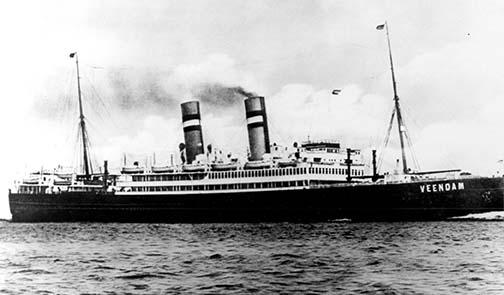
Photograph of Veendam

In 1937 the passenger accommodation on both Volendam and Veendam was extensively refurnished. In third class, upper berths were removed, new wardrobes and other furniture were installed, and "noiseless" fans were installed in cabins. Public areas were recarpeted, and the dining saloons were refurnished with new chairs and smaller tables. First class and tourist class cabins were also refurnished, and cocktail bars were installed near the dining saloons.

At the beginning of December 1937, NASM announced that Veendam would operate her cruises that winter from New Orleans instead of Hoboken. On 28 December 1937 she was to leave Rotterdam for New Orleans, from where she would cruise until resuming transatlantic service in April 1938. On 29 January 1938, Veendam's Master diverted her cruise to include an unscheduled call at the Dutch Caribbean island of Sint Eustatius. He did so to show his US passengers the scene of the "First Salute" of the Continental Colours by a foreign power, on 16 November 1776. NASM approved of the diversion, and added Sint Eustatius to the schedule for Veendam's February and March cruises.

== Crisis in Europe ==
On 23 October 1938, a passenger disappeared from Veendam on a westbound crossing. Rose Sonnenschein was a Jewish refugee from Vienna. She left her cabin at 03:30 hrs in the morning, and at 05:00 hrs her daughter, Bertha Ruckhaus, reported her missing. Mrs Ruckhaus stated that Mrs Sonnenschein was despondent that the Nazis had detained her son-in-law in a Nazi concentration camp, and had seized her family's property in Austria. The ship was searched, but not stopped, because of the amount of time that had passed.

On a westbound crossing in January 1939, Veendam brought 329 passengers, including 250 refugees from Germany, Italy, and Spain. The ship faced continuous rough weather, the wind reached up to 80 knots (150 km/h), and on 21 January her starboard propeller had to be shut down because the bushing of its propeller shaft was damaged. Running on one propeller, she reached Hoboken on 27 January, three days late.

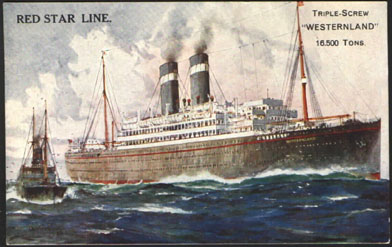
The former Red Star Liner Westernland, one of Veendam's running-mates on the Antwerp – Hoboken route

In May 1939, NASM bought Red Star Line, which the German government had forced Arnold Bernstein to sell. On 11 June, NASM announced that it would double the frequency of the former Red Star service between Antwerp and Hoboken by transferring Volendam and Veendam to the route to work alongside the Red Star liners Pennland and Westernland. All four ships on the route would call at Boulogne and Southampton in both directions. Veendam was to make her first sailing from Hoboken to Antwerp on 9 September.

On 1 September 1939 the Second World War began. NASM had Veendam's hull painted with neutrality markings: "VEENDAM – HOLLAND" painted amidships in large white capital letters, and a large Dutch flag painted either side of her bow.

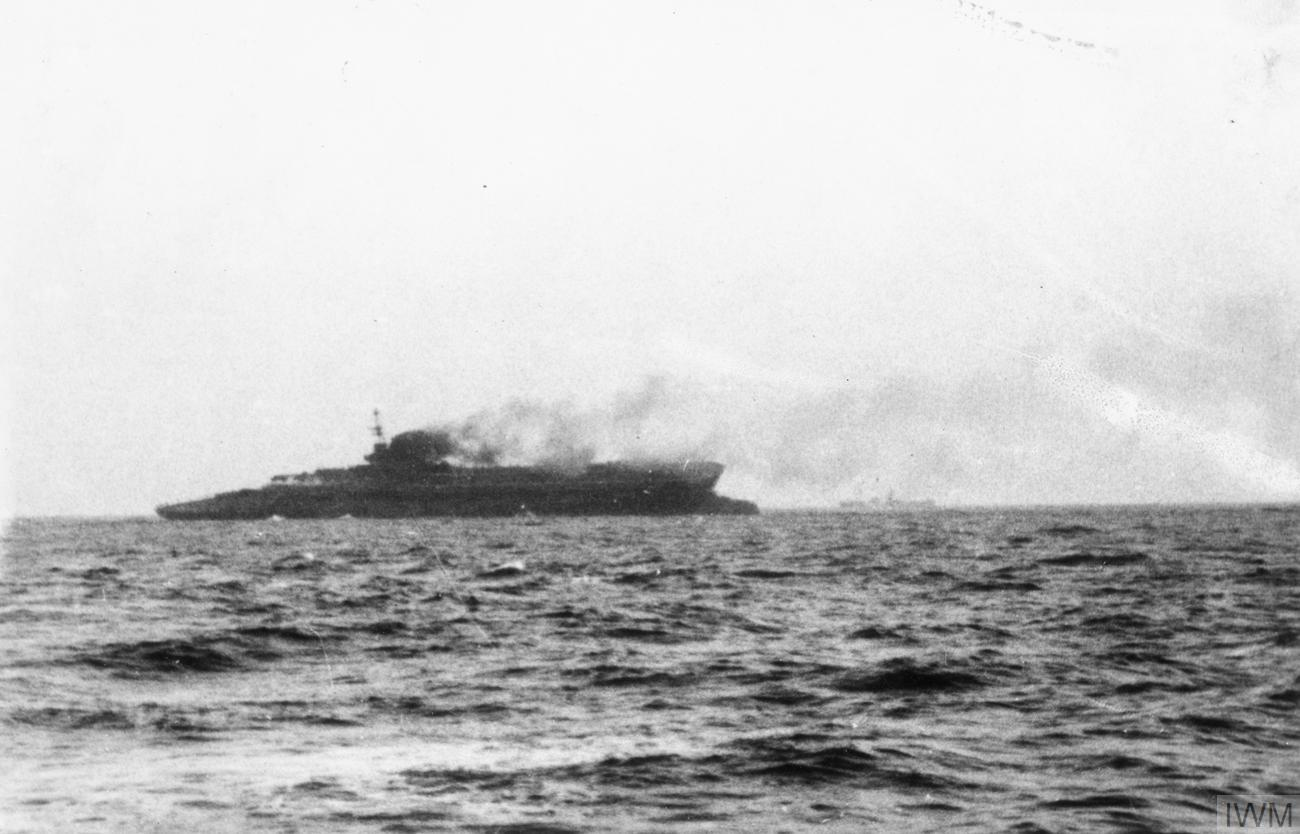
HMS Courageous sinking on 17 September 1939

On the evening of 17 September 1939, U-29 sank the Royal Navy aircraft carrier HMS Courageous in the Western Approaches, about 190 nautical miles (350 km) west-southwest of Dursey Island, with the loss of 519 men, including her commander. Her escorting destroyers counter-attacked the U-boat with depth charges, and started rescuing survivors. Veendam, the US cargo ship Collingsworth, Ellerman Lines cargo ship Dido all joined the rescue. Veendam launched 14 lifeboats and recovered Courageous' logbook as well as survivors. As Collingsworth and Veendam were neutral ships, they transferred their survivors to the destroyers HMS Inglefield and Kelly.

On 19 November, German newspapers including Börsen-Zeitung published a list of 58 British and French ships that Germany alleged had been converted into auxiliary cruisers, and which German forces could therefore sink without warning. The list included Veendam as a British auxiliary cruiser. The next day a Kriegsmarine spokesman said that Veendam had been included on the list "by mistake", and that she may have been confused with the French cargo ship Vendôme.

On 10 November 1939 Veendam landed 659 passengers at Hoboken, including 160 US citizens who had embarked at Antwerp or Southampton. Before the end of November, Veendam reverted to serving Rotterdam instead of Antwerp. On 22 December 1939, Veendam landed 630 passengers at Hoboken. They included 340 German Jewish refugees, and 100 US citizens. On 5 February she landed 532 passengers at Hoboken, including 350 refugees from central Europe and 58 US citizens.

== War service and damage ==
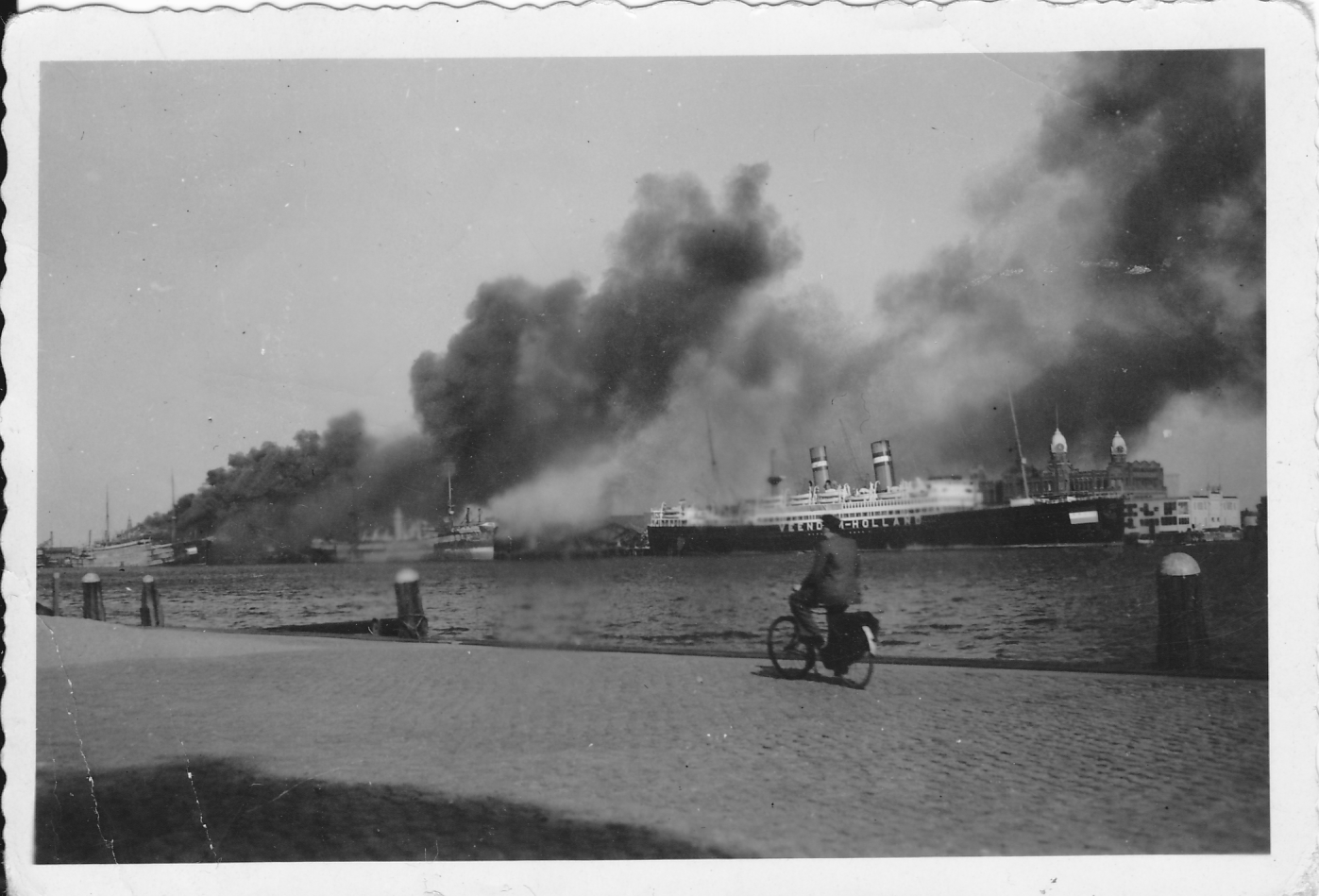
Ships in Rotterdam including Statendam (far left) and Veendam (right) burning on 11 May 1940. On the right, behind Veendam's foredeck, is the NASM headquarters building.

On 10 May 1940 Germany invaded the Netherlands. Veendam was moored in Rotterdam, in front of the NASM headquarters building on the Wilhelminakade. During fighting on 11 May, a dockside crane collapsed onto her, damaging her lifeboats and their davits. A small fire started aboard, but was soon extinguished. Veendam remained in Rotterdam.

In January 1941 German forces requisitioned Veendam, and on 30 May she left Rotterdam for Germany. On 24 July 1941 she was transferred to the Kriegsmarine as an accommodation ship, managed by Hamburg America Line. At first she was stationed at Gotenhafen and housed Organisation Todt workers. On 28 April 1942 she was transferred to Hamburg, and from 1 May she was renamed Marinestützpunkt Tollerort ("Naval Base Great Place") to house U-boat crews on leave.

Allied air raids on Hamburg damaged Veendam in June, July, November and December 1943, and again in December 1944. Three of the air raids started fires on the ship, and two of the raids damaged her engine room. Early in 1945, a near miss broke open her seacocks, causing her stern to settle on the bottom of the harbour. Further raids in March and April 1945 damaged her number one and two holds, causing her bow also to settle on the harbour bottom.

On 4 May 1945 Germany unconditionally surrendered to the Allies. On the same day, British forces boarded Veendam. Although burnt out and partly sunk, some of her accommodation was still usable. The Allies used her as an accommodation ship for Dutch seafarers coming to Hamburg to retrieve Dutch ships that the German authorities had seized. In October 1945 she was raised, and on 14 November she was dry docked at Blohm+Voss for her hull to be inspected and made watertight. On 7 January 1946 she left Hamburg, towed by the L Smit & Co salvage tugs Zwarte Zee and Tyne. Bad weather prevented her from leaving the Elbe estuary until 14 January. On 16 January she reached the Nederlandsche Droogdok en Scheepsbouw Maatschappij shipyard in Amsterdam.

== Post-war years ==
Veendam was refitted as a two-class ship, with berths for 223 passengers in first class and 363 in tourist class. Veendam town council presented her with a new certificate and aerial photograph of the town.

On 31 January 1947 she sailed from Amsterdam to Rotterdam, where she was returned to her owners. She left Rotterdam on 21 February 1947, called at Southampton, and reached Hoboken on 4 March carrying 576 passengers. This was 24 more than her regular capacity, and NASM stated that berths on her transatlantic crossings were fully booked until 1 August. Minimum one-way fares were $260 first class and $160 tourist class. She was the first NASM ship to call at Southampton since the Second World War. Until 1940, NASM transatlantic ships had served Boulogne. After the war this did not resume, as the port was not yet in a condition to resume handling large ocean liners.

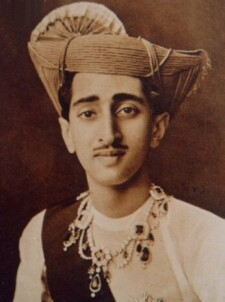
Yashwant Rao Holkar II, Maharaja of Indore

In her first few months back in civilian service, Veendam carried notable passengers including the Earl and Countess Granville, Maharaja and Maharani of Indore, International Court of Justice judge John Erskine Read, Professors Charles Best and Frederick Keeble, and actresses Rita Hayworth and Greta Keller. She also carried numerous Dutch emigrants, including large families intending to farm in the USA.

In August 1947 NASM announced that Veendam and the flagship Nieuw Amsterdam would resume cruising from Hoboken that December. That November the company announced that Veendam would make three six-day cruises to Bermuda, leaving Hoboken on 3 February, 16 March and 27 April 1948. Fares were to range from $140 to $300, plus 15 per cent tax. However, crossing from Rotterdam to Hoboken in late January 1948, Veendam met five days of adverse weather in the Atlantic, and at times had to reduce speed to as low as 5 knots (9 km/h). She reached Hoboken on 3 February, two days late. Her first Bermuda cruise started 24 hours later, but also finished 24 hours later.

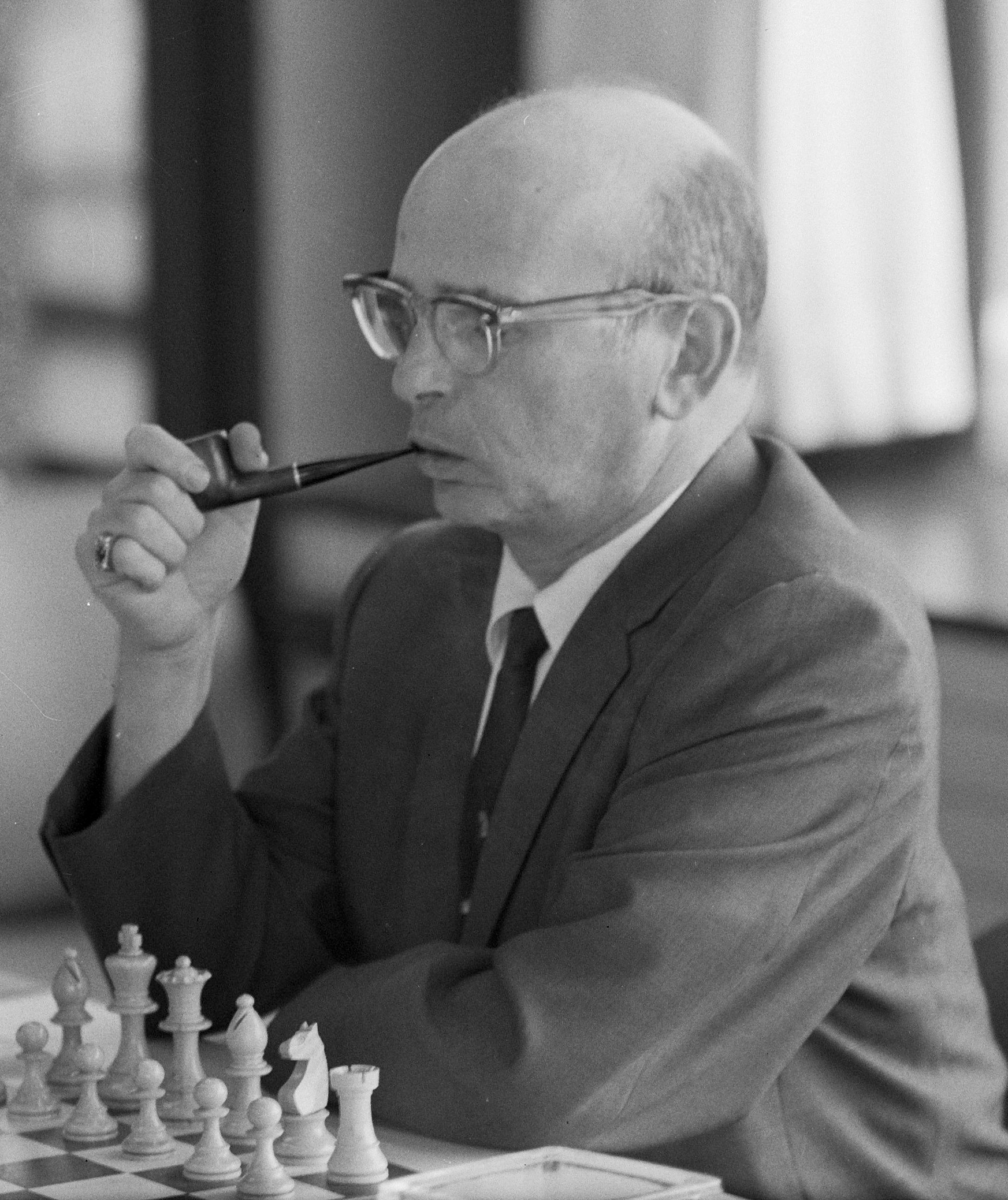
Chess Grandmaster Samuel Reshevsky

On 7 May 1948 Veendam left Hoboken carrying cargo that included post-war aid to the Netherlands, and Dutch paintings worth a total of $250,000, including works by Rembrandt, Jacob van Ruisdael, Maarten van Heemskerck, and Gerard ter Borch, which had been exhibited in the USA. Her passengers on that crossing included the conductor Pierre Monteux. Notable passengers on other transatlantic crossings by Veendam in 1948 included chess Grandmaster Samuel Reshevsky, who was returning from the World Chess Championship 1948, and Ulster Unionist Party MP Brian Faulkner, recently elected as the youngest member of the Parliament of Northern Ireland.

On 1 September 1948 Veendam left Hoboken on a six-day cruise to Bermuda for Labor Day weekend. NASM organised the cruise in conjunction with Furness Bermuda Line.

On 23 December 1948 Veendam left Hoboken on a cruise to the West Indies. Her schedule for the rest of that season was to alternate one-week trips to and from Bermuda with 18-day cruises to Caribbean islands and the Caribbean coast of South America. However, on 6 February 1949 NASM announced that it had cancelled one of her 18-day cruises, which was due to start on 29 March 1949, and replaced it with two shorter cruises: a 10-day trip to Havana and Nassau starting on 29 March, and a seven-day trip to Bermuda starting on 9 April. Minimum fares were $195 to Havana and Nassau and $150 to Bermuda.

Veendam was fully booked with 450 passengers for an 11-day cruise to Havana and Nassau that she started from Hoboken on 23 December 1949. Other cruise operators reported that bookings for Christmas cuirses were about 25 per cent lower than in the previous year. CGT even cancelled a 14-day cruise that the liner De Grasse was due to start on 23 December, the same day as Veendam's Christmas cruise. NASM reported that a cruise on Veendam starting from Hoboken on 9 February 1950 was fully booked by the end of December.

== Longshoremen's strike ==
By 1950 Veendam was serving Le Havre as well as Southampton. In July 1950 she was caught between Local 1247 of the International Longshoremen's Association and ILA President Joseph P. Ryan. At the beginning of July, officers of Local 1247 tried to dismiss the boss loader at a pier in Jersey City. The loader appealed to Ryan, and longshoremen stopped work on two American Export Lines ships in Jersey City in a wildcat strike. The internal ILA dispute spread to NASM's Fifth Street Pier in Hoboken, and when Veendam docked on 11 July, her 541 passengers had to unload their own baggage. A new NASM cargo ship, Diemerdijk, was also affected.

In an attempt to avoid the wildcat strike, NASM diverted Diemerdijk and Edam to Erie Basin, Brooklyn, and moved Veendam to Pier 51 on the North River. There longshoremen unloaded about 500 tons of her cargo on the morning of 12 July, but at midday they also stopped work. On 13 July NASM moved Veendam again, this time to Pier 3 at Tompkinsville, Staten Island, where members of Local 920 uinloaded the remainder of her cargo, and on 14 July she embarked 550 passengers for Southampton, Le Havre, and Rotterdam. She sailed on 14 July.

On the afternoon of 22 July Veendam's sister ship Volendam docked in Hoboken carrying 700 passengers. 50 porters and 25 baggage carriers arrived to unload her without any disruption. The strike at Jersey City lasted more than six weeks. Longshoremen returned to work on 21 August.

== Final years ==
Photo of the deck of the SS Veendam during a passenger cruise in 1951.

On 20 December 1950 Veendam arrived in Hoboken, and two days later she left on her first Caribbean cruise of the season. On a cruise in January 1951, her passengers included Cardinal Thomas Tien Ken-sin. On her next cruise, early that February, Cuban authorities in Havana quarantined her in Havana after one of her officers fell ill with influenza. Six of her passengers were hospitalised in Havana.

In August 1951 Veendam made a cruise to Canada. She left Hoboken on 2 August carrying 478 passengers. The cruise explored the Saguenay River and visited Quebec, and was also scheduled to visit Bermuda. The minimum fare was $235. She got back to Hoboken on 16 August.

Veendam remained in transatlantic service in December 1951. Her first cruise for that season left Hoboken on 24 January 1952.

On a westbound transatlantic crossing on 30 July 1952 a teenage passenger was lost overboard. Patsy Ann Partridge was last seen at 03:00 hrs, strolling on the after deck. At 06:30 hrs her younger sister noticed her missing from the cabin they were sharing. Veendam turned about, searched for several hours, and then resumed her westbound course. After the search, her younger sister found a suicide note in a suitcase. Partridge had been a student at Saint Martin's School of Art in London, studying to be a book illustrator, and was upset at having failed one of her subjects.

Photo of passengers relaxing in sun on the deck of SS Veendam during a passenger cruise.

On 21 October 1953, NASM announced that it would replace Veendam with a new 21,000 GRT ship, and on 31 October the company stated that it had sold Veendam to Bethlehem Steel for scrap. NASM estimated that in her 30-year career the ship had carried nearly 250,000 passengers and covered 1,932,000 nautical miles (3,578,000 km), including 196 transatlantic crossings. The writer Thornton Wilder described a round-trip on Veendam as "the ideal vacation". Although capable of 15 knots (28 km/h), she had mostly sailed at a more economical 13 knots (24 km/h), but even then, her fuel consumption was uneconomical compared with new steamships.

For her final transatlantic crossing, NASM reduced all first class berths to tourist fares, and she sailed as a one-class ship. On 11 November she landed 610 passengers at Hoboken, which was a record since her 1946–47 refit. Most of her crew then returned to Rotterdam aboard the flagship Nieuw Amsterdam. A skeleton crew of 64 then took Veendam from Hoboken to Baltimore, where the Patapsco Scrap Co, part of Bethleham Steel, broke her up.

== Bibliography ==
- Bonsor, NRP (1975). North Atlantic Seaway. Vol. 3. Brookside. ISBN 978-0-668-03679-5.
- Haws, Duncan (1995). Holland America Line. Merchant Fleets series. Vol. 28. Uckfield: Travel Creatours Ltd Publications. ISBN 0946378258.
- Herber, Rob (2016). Nico Bloembergen / meester van het licht (in Dutch). Utrecht: Eberon Uitgeverij. ISBN 978-3-030-25737-8.
- Le Fleming, HM (1963). Ships of the Holland-America Line. London: John Marshbank Ltd.
- Lloyd's Register of Shipping. Vol. II.–Steamers and Motorships. London: Lloyd's Register of Shipping. 1924 – via Internet Archive.
- Lloyd's Register of Shipping (PDF). Vol. II.–Steamers and Motorships of 300 Tons Gross and Over. London: Lloyd's Register of Shipping. 1930 – via Southampton City Council.
- Lloyd's Register of Shipping (PDF). Vol. II.–Steamers and Motorships of 300 Tons Gross and Over. London: Lloyd's Register of Shipping. 1934 – via Southampton City Council.
