= University Recording Company =

- Founded: 1945
- Defunct: 1947
- Status: Inactive
- Country of origin: United States
- Location: Hollywood

University Recording Company is a Hollywood based record label that existed from 1945 to 1947. The label operated exclusively via sales through the U.S. Mail, and its president was composer/songwriter Jimmy Richards. The label released 78 rpm records by musicians such as Red Nichols, Pinky Tomlin, Al Donahue, and The Ginger Snaps.

== See also ==
- List of record labels
