= SS Queen of Bermuda =

British cruise ship of the mid-20th century

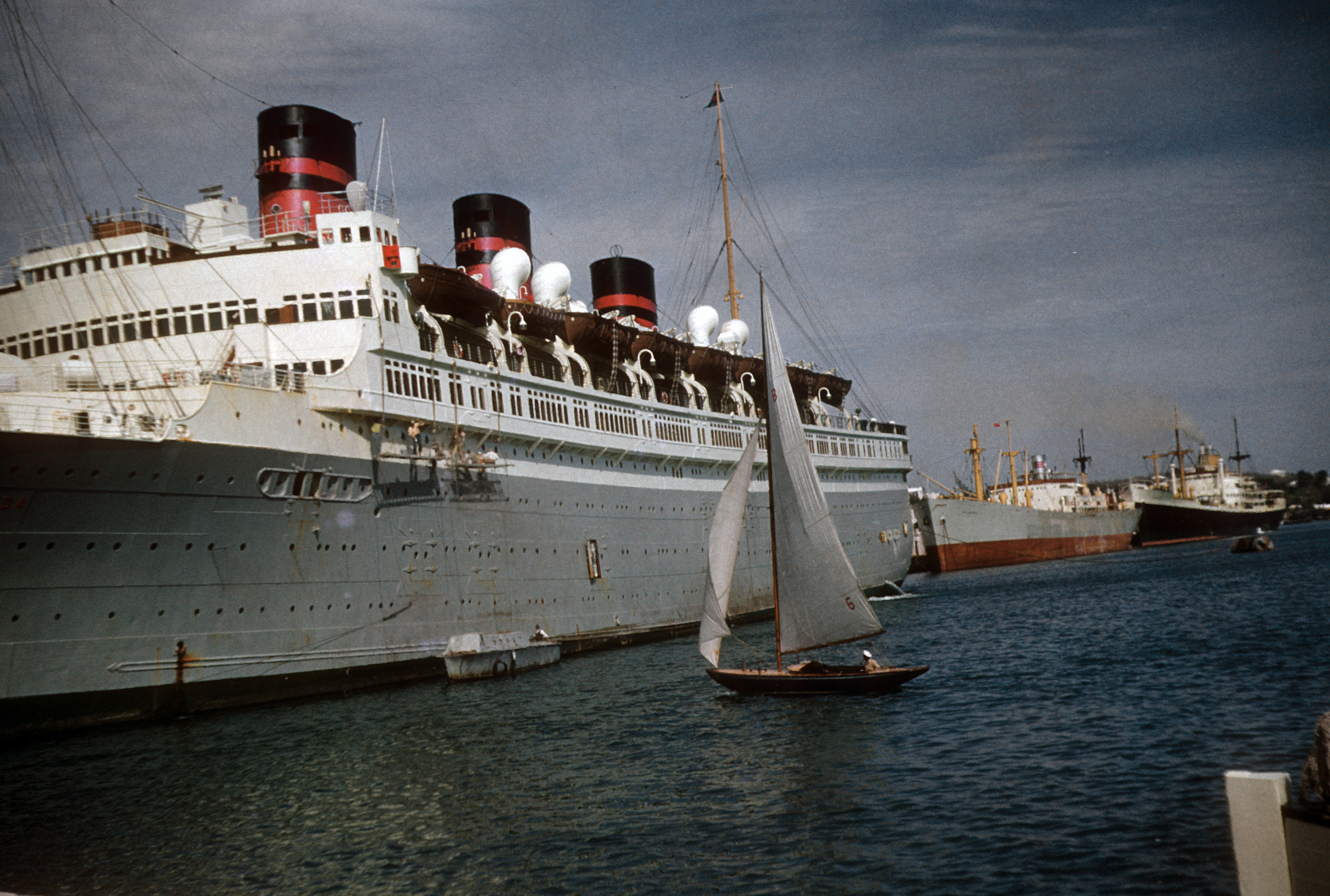
- Queen of Bermuda in Hamilton in the early 1950s

History

United Kingdom
- Owner: Furness, Withy & Co Ltd
- Operator: Furness Bermuda Line (1933–39, 1943–66); Royal Navy (1939–43)
- Port of registry: Hamilton, Bermuda
- Route: New York – Hamilton (1933–39, 1949–66)
- Builder: Vickers-Armstrongs
- Yard number: 681
- Launched: 2 September 1932
- Completed: 14 February 1933
- Maiden voyage: 21 February 1933 Liverpool – New York
- In service: 1933
- Out of service: 1966
- Identification: UK official number 156189; Call sign VQJP; pennant number F73 (1939–43)
- Fate: Scrapped

General characteristics
- Tonnage: 22,575 GRT; tonnage under deck 13,107; 12,777 NRT
- Length: 553.4 ft (168.7 m)
- Beam: 76.7 ft (23.4 m)
- Draught: 27 ft (8.2 m)
- Depth: 39 ft (12 m)
- Installed power: 4274 NHP
- Propulsion: 2 × steam turbines, electric generators & motors, 4 × screws
- Speed: 19 knots (35 km/h)
- Capacity: 700 1st class and 31 2nd class passengers (1933–39); 733 passengers, all 1st class (1949–61)
- Sensors & processing systems: direction finding equipment; echo sounding equipment; gyrocompass; submarine signalling equipment
- Armament: as AMC: 7 × BL 6-inch Mk XII naval guns; 2 × QF 3-inch 20 cwt anti-aircraft guns
- Notes: sister ship: Monarch of Bermuda

SS Queen of Bermuda was a British turbo-electric ocean liner that belonged to Furness, Withy & Co Ltd. Its Furness Bermuda Line subsidiary operated her between New York and Bermuda before and after the Second World War. During the war she served as first an armed merchant cruiser and then as a troop ship.

== Building ==
Furness, Withy ordered Queen of Bermuda to replace the liner MV Bermuda, which had been destroyed by fire in June 1931 after barely three and a half years' service. Queen of Bermuda was the sister ship of Monarch of Bermuda which had been launched in March 1931 and entered service that December.

Vickers-Armstrongs built Queen of Bermuda at its shipyard in Barrow-in-Furness. The ship was launched and christened on 2 September 1932 by Lady Cubitt, wife of the Governor of Bermuda, with a bottle of Empire wine.

She was 553.4 ft (168.7 m) long, had a beam of 76.7 ft (23.4 m) and draught of 27 ft (8.2 m). She was assessed as 22,575 GRT and 12,777 NRT. She had capacity for refrigerated cargo, and as built she had berths for 700 first class and 31 second class passengers.

The ship had eight water-tube boilers with a combined heating surface of 39,720 square feet (3,690 m^{2}). The boilers supplied steam at 400 lb_{f}/in^{2} to two steam turbines. The turbines drove electric generators that powered electric motors to drive her four screws, giving her a speed of 19 knots (35 km/h). The ship also featured a new innovations that included a cooling system with individual control knobs in each stateroom that passengers were able to regulate the temperature. As built, she had three funnels.

== Liner, auxiliary cruiser and troop ship ==
On February 27th, 1933 the Queen of Bermuda set sail on her maiden voyage, joining Monarch of Bermuda on scheduled services between New York and Hamilton, Bermuda. A round trip took six days.

In 1935 Albert Einstein used this ship to reach New York, and then moved to his home in Princeton, NJ

Just before the Second World War, on 29 August 1939 the Admiralty requisitioned the ship for conversion into an armed merchant cruiser. One of her three funnels was removed, either as a disguise or to improve the field of fire for her guns. Her primary armament was seven BL 6-inch Mk XII naval guns. Her secondary armament included two QF 3-inch 20 cwt anti-aircraft guns.

She was commissioned on 28 October as HMS Queen of Bermuda with the pennant number F73. As a cruiser she served on patrol duty and as a convoy escort, mostly in the North and South Atlantic. In March 1941 she visited Deception Island and destroyed shore facilities there to prevent their use by German merchant cruisers. In 1943 she served with the Eastern Fleet in the Indian Ocean and made one visit to Fremantle in Western Australia.

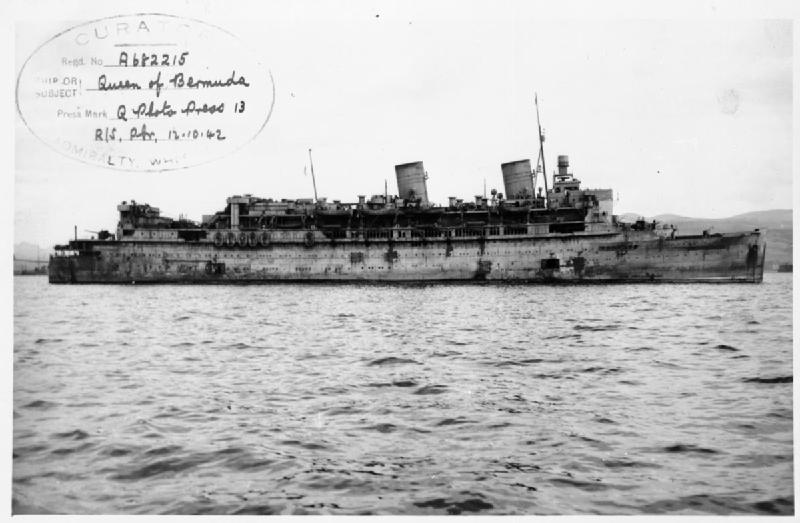
HMS Queen of Bermuda in WWII

In May 1943 the Admiralty returned the ship to Furness, Withy and the Ministry of War Transport had her refitted as a troop ship. For the next two years she carried troops between Britain, Gibraltar, Port Said in Egypt and Taranto in Italy, and in 1945 she made one visit to Bombay. In 1946 she repatriated Italian prisoners of war from Liverpool to Naples and UK military personnel from the Far East to Britain. She operated between Liverpool, Bombay and Singapore.

== Post-war civilian service ==
In 1947 the UK Government released the ship for return to civilian service. Furness, Withy had her overhauled and refitted and her third funnel was reinstated. As refitted she had berths for 733 passengers, all first class.

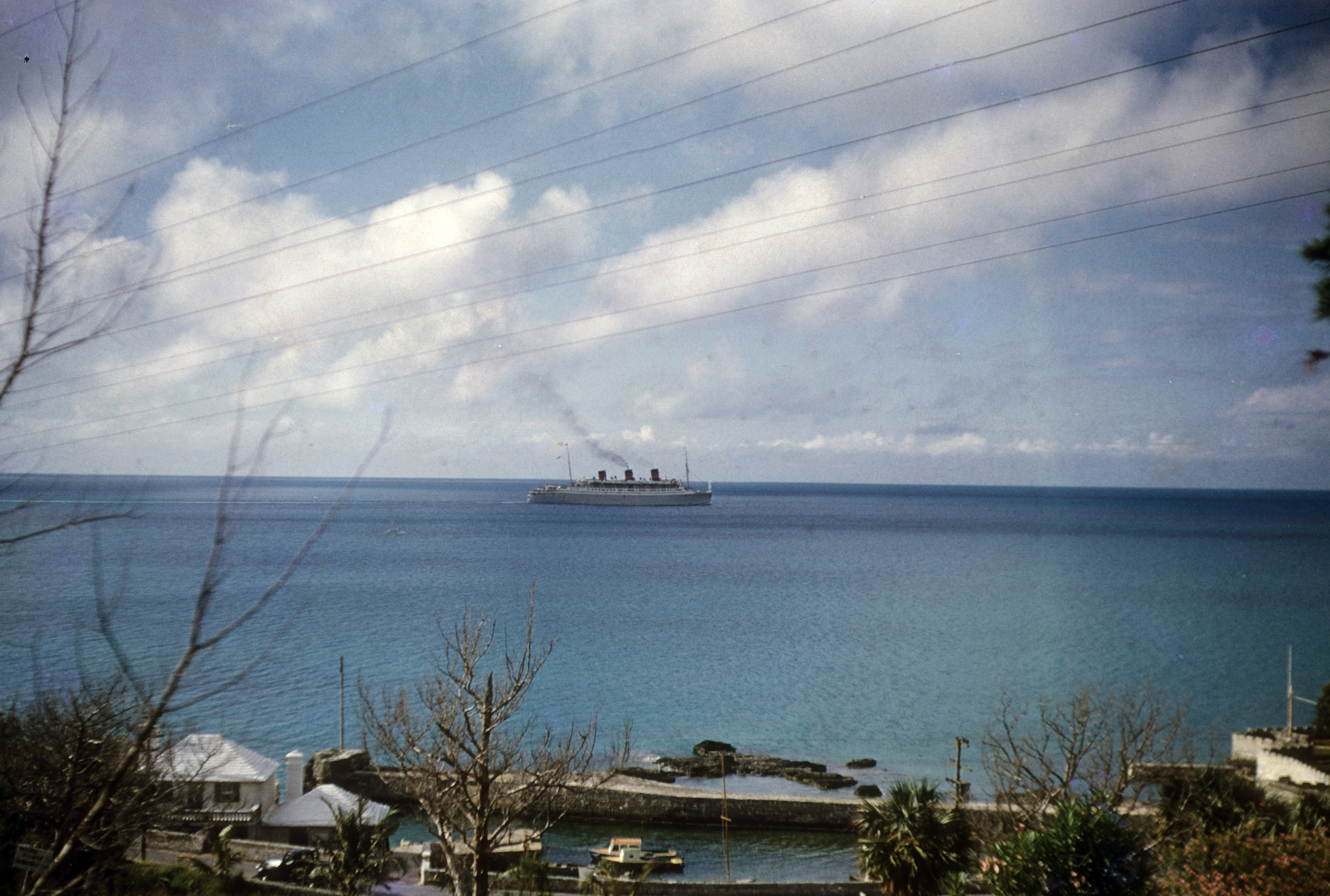
Queen of Bermuda leaving Bermuda in December 1952 or January 1953. Devonshire Dock is in the foreground.

In February 1949 she returned to her pre-war route between New York and Hamilton. Her sister Monarch of Bermuda did not join her as she had been damaged by fire in a shipyard in 1947 and Furness, Withy had sold her. In 1951 a new Furness, Withy ship, the 13,834 GRT Ocean Monarch, joined Queen of Bermuda on the route.

=== 1961 refit ===
In October 1961 Harland and Wolff in Belfast started work to modify Queen of Bermuda. She was lengthened, all three funnels were removed and one modern funnel was installed amidships. This gave the ship the distinction of being the only ocean liner to have sailed with one, two and three funnels. As rebuilt she was now assessed as 22,552 GRT. Her sea trials began on 23 February 1962 and returned to her regular route, running between New York and Hamilton, on 7 April.

=== End of service ===
In November 1966 Furness, Withy ceased its Furness Bermuda Line operation. New owners bought Ocean Monarch for further passenger service but Queen of Bermuda was sold for scrap. On 6 December that year she arrived in Faslane in Scotland to be broken up.

== Bibliography ==
- Hardy, AC (8 September 1936). "Bermudian Luxury Liners". Shipping Wonders of the World (Part 31): 970–974.
- Harnack, Edwin P (1938) [1903]. All About Ships & Shipping (7th ed.). London: Faber and Faber.
- Harnack, Edwin P (1964) [1903]. All About Ships & Shipping (11th ed.). London: Faber and Faber.
- Miller, William Jr (2001). Picture History of British Ocean Liners 1900 to the Present. Mineola: Dover Publications. p. 76. ISBN 0-486-41532-5.
