= Furness Bermuda Line =

- Type: Passenger Shipping
- Founded: 1919
- Defunct: 1966
- Headquarters: New York City, NY
- Area served: New York – Bermuda
- Parent: Furness, Withy

Furness Bermuda Line was a UK shipping line that operated in the 20th century. It was part of Furness, Withy and ran passenger liners between New York and the British Overseas Territory of Bermuda from 1919 to 1966.

== Origins ==
The Quebec Steam Ship Company had served Bermuda since 1874. Canada Steamship Lines took over the company in 1913 and sold it in 1919 to Furness, Withy, who renamed it the Furness Bermuda Line. At first the route had only one ship, the 5,530 GRT Bermudian, which Sir James Laing & Sons had built in 1904 and which Furness, Withy renamed Fort Hamilton.

RMS Fort Hamilton, Furness Bermuda first ship

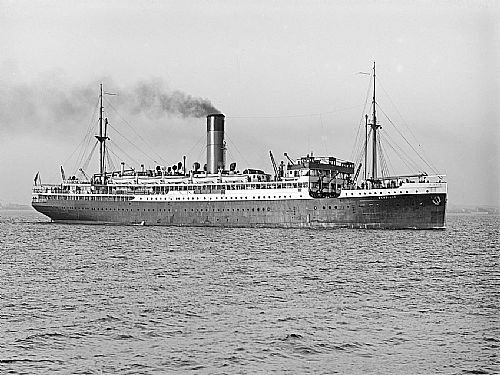
Wandilla, which Furness, Withy renamed Fort St. George

In 1921 Furness, Withy bought a pair of ships from the Adelaide Steamship Company: the 7,785 GRT Wandilla and 7,784 GRT Willochra. They were quadruple-expansion steamships that William Beardmore and Company in Glasgow had built in 1912 and 1913.

Furness, Withy had Willochra fitted out with berths for 400 first class passengers and renamed her Fort St. George. It had Wandilla modified to carry 380 first class and 50 second class passengers, replaced her cargo holds with tanks to supply Bermuda with fresh water, and renamed her RMS Fort Victoria.

At the same time Furness, Withy invested in tourist development such as hotels on Bermuda.

== Growing trade ==
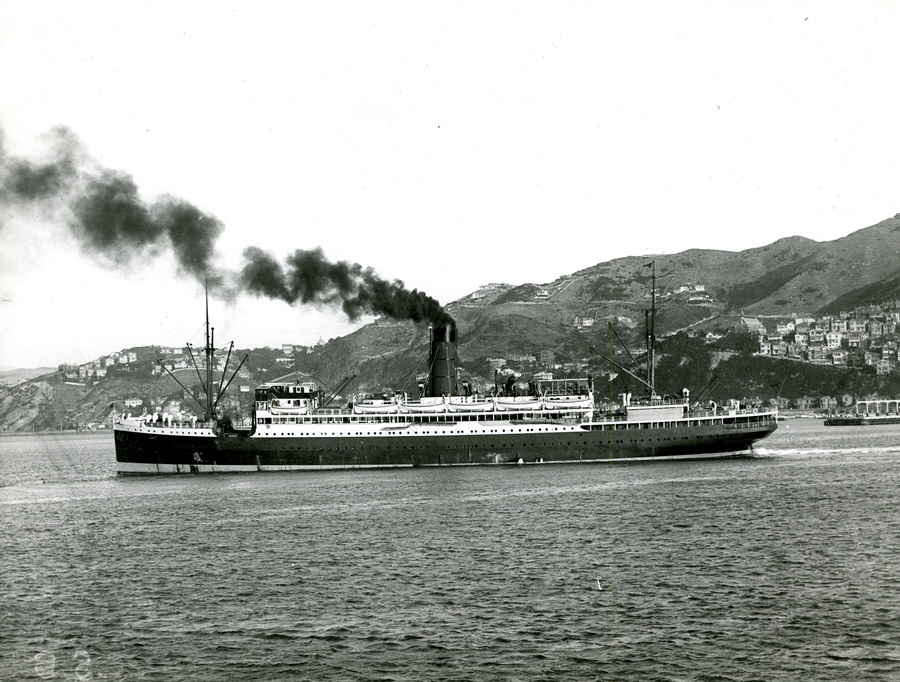
RMS Fort Victoria, which was sunk in a collision in 1929

Furness, Withy had competition from the Royal Mail Steam Packet Company, which had long served Bermuda. After the First World War enough tourists from North America wanted to sail to Bermuda for RMSP to employ prestigious "A-series" liners such as the 10,537 GRT Araguaya, 11,073 GRT Avon and 12,015 GRT Arcadian on the route. However, in 1926 RMSP withdrew its service between the US, Bermuda and West Indies.

Furness, Withy sold Fort Hamilton and ordered a 19,086 GRT passenger liner for the route. Normally it would take 27 months to build a ship of such size, but Workman, Clark and Company in Belfast completed the motor ship Bermuda in December 1927, just 16 months after laying her keel. She had berths for 691 passengers, could sail between New York and Hamilton in about 40 hours, and was an immediate success.

Bermuda, Furness Bermuda Line's first purpose-built ship

The Great Depression that began in 1929 caused a worldwide slump in shipping. Most types of cargo and passenger traffic sharply declined. Many hundreds of ships were laid up, and thousands of officers and tens of thousands of seamen were laid off. Most of Furness, Withy's cargo and passenger services were affected. But bookings from the US to Bermuda, many of them for one-week short holidays, remained buoyant. Furness, Withy ordered a second large ship in order to offer two sailings each week: one on Saturday and the other midweek.

However, before the new ship could be completed, Furness, Withy suffered two setbacks. In December 1929 Fort Victoria was sunk when the 5,946 GRT Algonquin collided with her in fog in Ambrose Channel off New York. Then in June 1931, Bermuda's passenger accommodation was gutted by fire in Hamilton Harbour. Bermuda's hull and main engines survived, so she was returned to Workman, Clark to be repaired.

But in the shipping slump, even modern passenger liners were laid up and readily available. Furness, Withy was able to charter ships including Cunard Line's RMS Franconia and Holland America Line Veendam to maintain its Bermuda service.

== The "Millionaires' Ships" ==
Furness Bermuda promotion poster for Queen of Bermuda

Monarch of Bermuda was launched in March 1931 and completed that November. At 22,424 GRT was larger and more luxurious than Bermuda, with berths for 830 first class and 30 second class passengers. Vickers-Armstrongs built Monarch of Bermuda at its Walker shipyard. She was a turbine steamer, and was Furness, Withy's first ship to have turbo-electric transmission. She was swifter than Bermuda, easily exceeding 19 knots (35 km/h) on her sea trials.

In November 1931 Bermuda's rebuild at Belfast was nearly complete when she suffered a second fire that caused more serious damage than the first. Between them the two fires caused damage estimated to cost her underwriters £1.25 million. Workman, Clark bought the wreck and Furness, Withy ordered a turbo-electric sister ship for Monarch of Bermuda.

In the meantime Furness, Withy temporarily achieved its aim of a two-ship service by chartering modern cabin liners from Canadian Pacific: the 20,021 GRT Duchess of York for several trips in 1931 and 1932 and the 20,123 GRT Duchess of Bedford in the early months of 1933. The latter maintained the service alongside Monarch of Bermuda until Queen of Bermuda was completed.

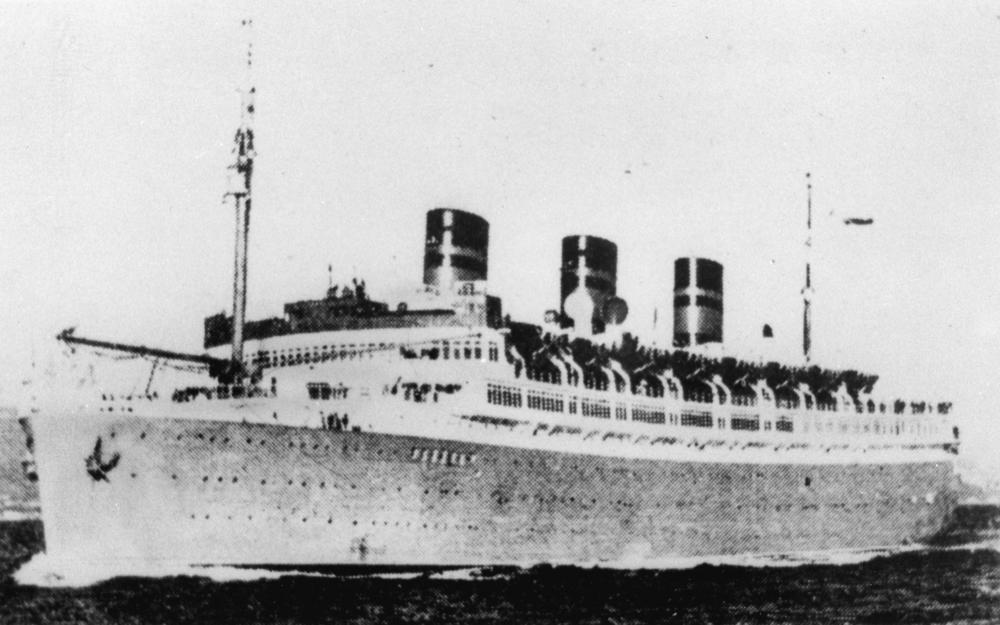
Queen of Bermuda

Vickers-Armstrongs built the 22,575 GRT Queen of Bermuda at its Barrow-in-Furness shipyard, launching her in September 1932 and completing her in February 1933.

Queen of Bermuda looked like Monarch of Bermuda but had slightly larger cabins and only 731 berths. They were nicknamed the "Millionaires' Ships".

The pair competed with each other on speed. Eventually Queen of Bermuda took the record with a passage from New York to Hamilton in 32 hours, 48 minutes, which meant that her speed averaged 20.33 knots (37.65 km/h).

In 1935 Furness, Withy sold Fort St. George to Lloyd Triestino, who renamed her Cesarea. In 1938, to meet the high demand of the Bermuda service, Furness charted White Star Line's Georgic to operate in tandem with the Monarch of Bermuda and Queen of Bermuda.

== Second World War ==
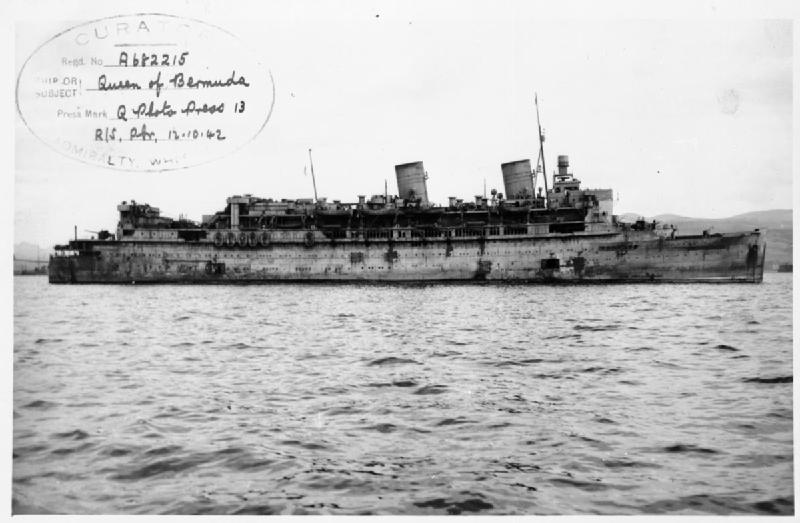
HMS Queen of Bermuda in WWII

In the Second World War Monarch of Bermuda was converted into a troop ship and the Admiralty requisitioned Queen of Bermuda as an armed merchant cruiser. Queen of Bermuda was released from the Royal Navy in 1943 and spent the next few years as a troop ship.

Both ships survived the war, but for a while afterwards the Ministry of Transport continued to use both ships as military and government transports. Furness, Withy made do with two small ships on the route between New York and Bermuda.

Eventually the UK Government released Monarch of Bermuda and Furness, Withy started having her converted back into a luxury liner to return to her former route. But in March 1947 while being refitted she was damaged by fire, so Furness, Withy sold her to the UK Government. The UK Government then released Queen of Bermuda. Her refit took 18 months, cost more than her original building and was not completed until February 1949.

== Post War Voyages & Fleet ==
Promotion poster for Ocean Monarch passing Queen of Bermuda

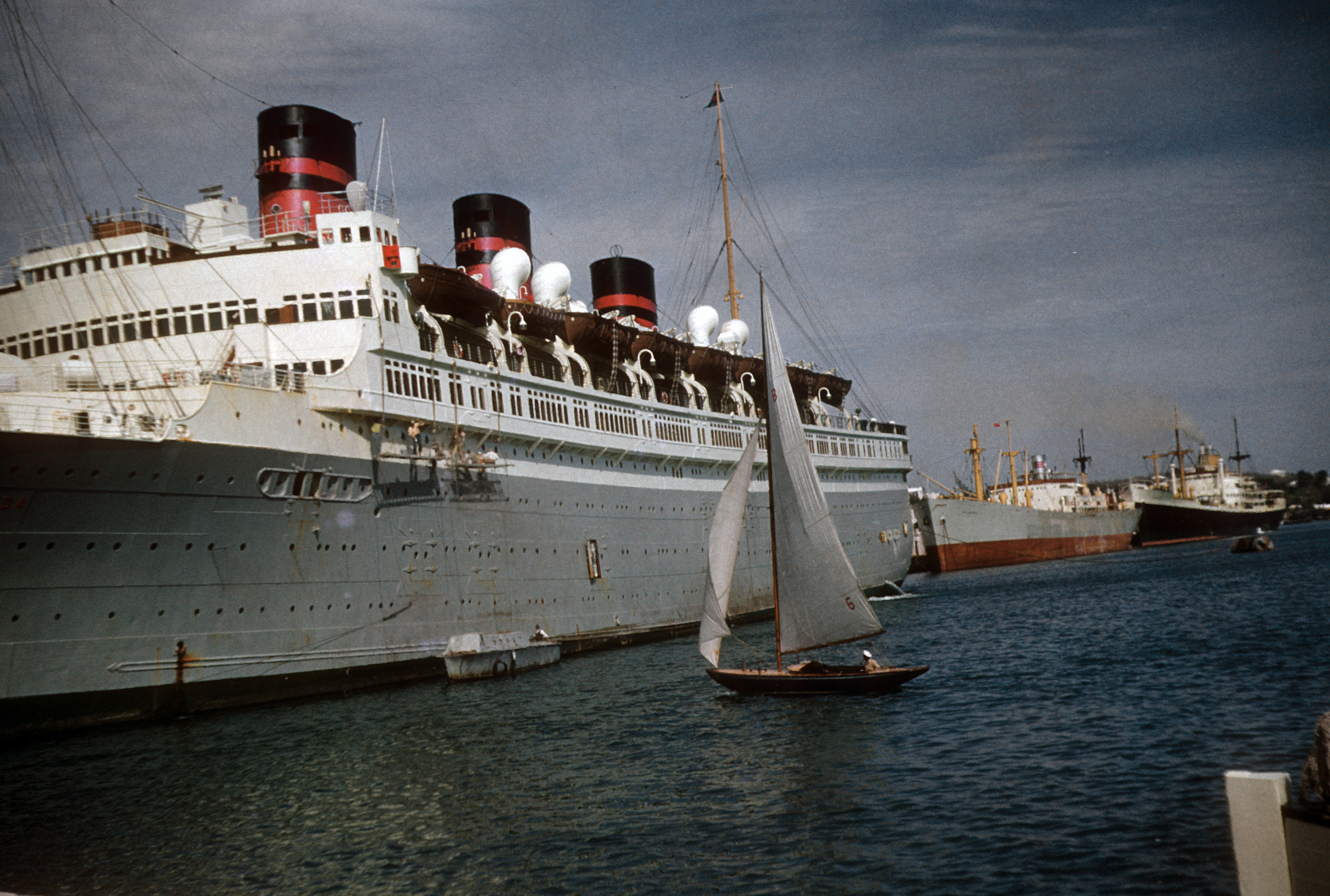
Queen of Bermuda in Hamilton Harbour, Bermuda in the early 1950s

The Queen of Bermuda returned to the New York-Bermuda service after the war. To replace the Monarch of Bermuda, Furness, Withy ordered a smaller ship. the 13,834 GRT Ocean Monarch, completed by Vickers-Armstrongs at Walker in 1951.

In October 1961 the Queen of Bermuda was sent to Harland and Wolff in Belfast for a refit, to modernize the ship. The bow was reshaped, and all three funnels were removed, replaced with one funnel amidships. This gave the ship the distinction of being the only ocean liner to have sailed with one, two and three funnels.

The two ships continued to serve the island until late 1966, when Furness, Withy ceased its Bermuda service. The Queen of Bermuda was sold for scrap, while the Ocean Monarch was laid up until 1967, when she was sold to Navigation Maritime Bulgare and renamed Varna.

== Fleet ==
=== Furness Bermuda Passenger Fleet ===
Ship Name	Year Completed	Years in Service for Line	Shipyard	Status	Notes
Fort Hamilton	1904	1920-1926	Sir James Laing & Sons Ltd., Deptford, England	Scrapped 1934	Built for Quebec Steam Ship Company as the Bermudian; Sold to Cosulich Line in 1926
Fort St. George	1912	1921-1935	William Beardmore & Co Ltd, Dalmuir, West Dunbartonshire, Scotland	Bombed and sank 1942	Built as SS Wandilla, Adelaide Steamship Company; Sister ship to Fort Victoria
Fort Victoria	1913	1921-1929	William Beardmore & Co Ltd, Dalmuir, West Dunbartonshire, Scotland	Sank 1929	Built as the SS Willochra, Adelaide Steamship Company; Sister ship to Fort St. George
Bermuda	1928	1928–1931	Workman, Clark and Company, Belfast, Northern Ireland	Burned, towed & wrecked/ partially scrapped 1933	First purpose-built ship for the line
Monarch of Bermuda	1931	1931–39	Vickers-Armstrongs, Walker, Newcastle upon Tyne, England	Scrapped 1966	Caught fire at shipyard during postwar refit, sold to Shaw, Savill & Albion Line
Queen of Bermuda	1933	1933–39, 1943–66	Vickers-Armstrongs, Walker, Newcastle upon Tyne, England	Scrapped 1966	sister ship to Monarch of Bermuda
Fort Townshend	1936	1939, 1945-1950	Blythswood Shipbuilding, Glasgow, Scotland	Scrapped 1984	Built for Furness, Withy Red Cross Line; sister ship to Fort Amherst
Fort Amherst	1936	1945-1952	Blythswood Shipbuilding, Glasgow, Scotland	Scrapped 1964	Built for Furness, Withy Red Cross Line; sister ship to Fort Townshend
Ocean Monarch	1951	1951–67	Vickers-Armstrongs, Walker, Newcastle upon Tyne, England	Burned, sank 1981	Last ship built for the line

=== Furness Bermuda tenders ===
Ship Name	Year Completed	Years in Service for Line	Shipyard	Status	Notes
Bermudian	1915	1923-1947	Admiralty whaler, Adty No 878. Smiths Dock Company, South Bank, UK	Scrapped 1958	Built as HMS Arctic Whale, purchased by Furness in 1923 for service to St. George Hotel; Sold to Bermuda Transportation Co, Hamilton
Castle Harbour (originally Mid-Ocean)	1929	1929-1939	Blythswood Shipbuilding Co. Ltd, Glasgow, Scotland	Sunk by torpedo in WWII off Tobago 1942	Purpose-built for Furness Bermuda Line for service to St George Hotel & Mid Ocean Club, and later Castle Harbour Hotel

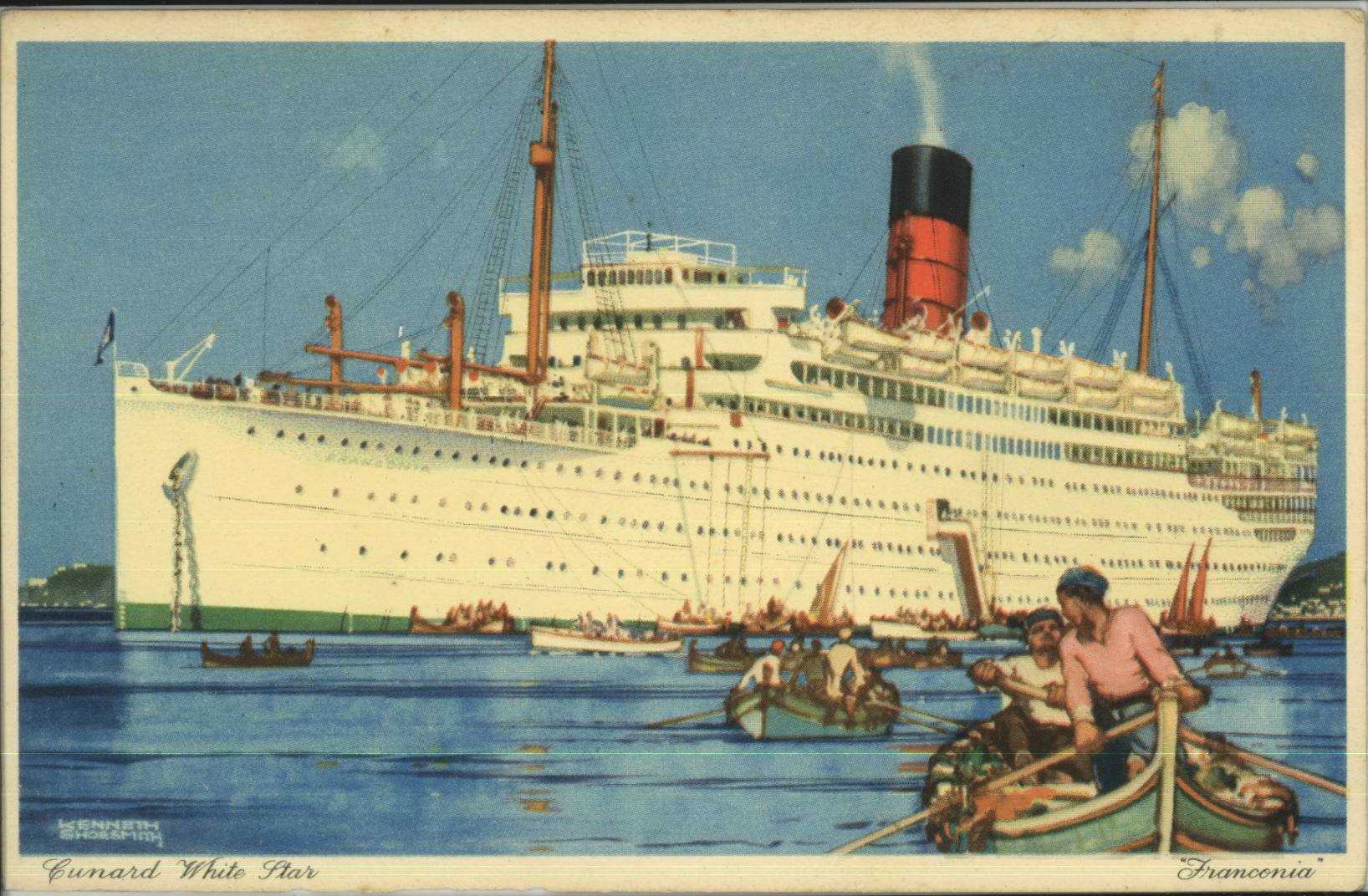
After a fire put Bermuda out of service, Furness, Withy chartered ships including Cunard Line's Franconia

=== Chartered Fleet ===
- Veendam, Holland America Line, (chartered: Winter-Summer 1930)
- Carinthia, Cunard Line, (chartered 1931)
- Franconia, Cunard Line, (chartered: 1931 & 1932)
- Duchess of York, Canadian Pacific Line, (chartered: 1931 & 1932)
- Duchess of Bedford, Canadian Pacific Line, (chartered: 1931 & 1932)
- Georgic, White Star Line (chartered: 1938)
- Lancastria, Cunard Line, (chartered 1939)

== Furness Bermuda Line Hotels ==
Bermudiana Hotel, Built 1924

Furness, Withy bought and built several hotels in Bermuda, using the tenders Bermudian and Castle Harbour to ferry passengers to hotels outside of the main harbor in Hamilton. Furness sold all its hotels in 1958.

- Mid Ocean Club (Tucker's Town)
- The St. George (St. George's)
- Bermudiana (Hamilton Harbor)
- Castle Harbour Hotel (Castle Harbor)

== Bibliography ==
- Burrell, David (1992). Furness Withy 1891–1991. Kendal: World Ship Society. ISBN 0-905617-70-3.
- Miller, William Jr (2001a). Ocean liner chronicles: great passenger ships and their stories. London: Carmania Press. ISBN 0-9534291-8-0. OCLC 54783020.
- Miller, William Jr (2001b). Picture History of British Ocean Liners 1900 to the Present. Mineola: Dover Publications. p. 49. ISBN 0-486-41532-5.
- Plowman, Piers (2002). Queen of Bermuda and the Furness Bermuda Line. Card, Stephen J. The Old Royal Naval Dockyard, Bermuda: Bermuda Maritime Museum Press. ISBN 0-921560-10-9. OCLC 65177653.
- Wilson, RM (1956). The Big Ships. London: Cassell & Co. pp. 100–103, 115–116.
- Smith, James R. (January 2022). "Fort Townshend: Liner, Saudi Royal Yacht and Cruise Ship". Marine News. 76 (1): 27–29. ISSN 0025-3243.
