= MV Bermuda =

British ocean liner that was destroyed by fire

Coordinates: 58°14.993′N 05°11.609′W

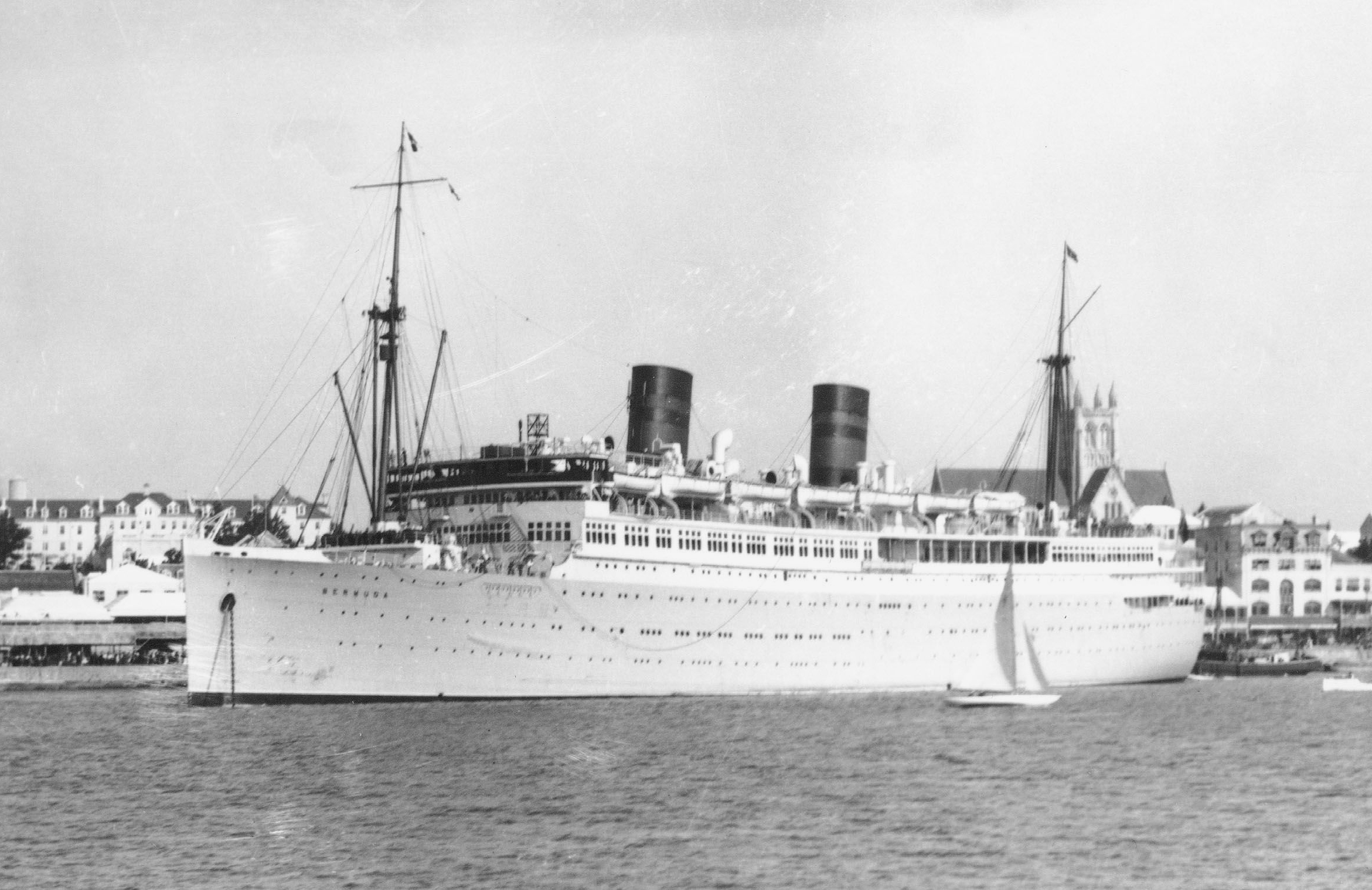
- MV Bermuda at Hamilton, Bermuda

History

United Kingdom
- Name: Bermuda
- Namesake: Bermuda
- Owner: Bermuda & West Indies SS Co Ltd
- Operator: Furness Bermuda Line
- Port of registry: Hamilton
- Route: New York – Hamilton
- Builder: Workman, Clark and Company
- Launched: 28 July 1927
- Completed: December 1927
- In service: January 1928
- Out of service: June 1931
- Identification: UK official number 65610; code letters KWTQ; by 1930: call sign VPNC
- Fate: Wrecked 30 April 1933

General characteristics
- Type: Ocean liner
- Tonnage: 19,086 GRT 11,281 NRT
- Length: 525.9 ft (160.3 m)
- Beam: 74.1 ft (22.6 m)
- Draught: 16 ft 9 in (5.11 m)
- Depth: 39.6 ft (12.1 m)
- Decks: 4
- Installed power: 2,772 NHP
- Propulsion: 4 × screws; 4 × two-stroke diesel engines
- Speed: 17 knots (31 km/h)
- Capacity: 691 passengers: 616 first class; 75 second class

MV Bermuda was an ocean liner that Furness, Withy's Furness Bermuda Line operated between New York and Bermuda from 1928 until 1931.

She was damaged by two fires in 1931, the second of which put her beyond economic repair. In 1933 she was being towed to be scrapped when she broke adrift, ran ashore and was wrecked.

Bermuda has been referred to as the unluckiest liner ever built or ever to go afloat.

== Building ==
Furness, Withy ordered Bermuda in 1926 to take an opportunity created when the Royal Mail Steam Packet Company withdrew its service between the US, Bermuda and the West Indies. Normally it would take 27 months to build a ship of such size, but Workman, Clark and Company in Belfast completed Bermuda just 16 months after laying her keel. She was launched in July 1927 and completed that December.

Colourised postcard of Bermuda

Bermuda was 525.9 feet (160.3 m) long, had a beam of 74.1 feet (22.6 m) and depth of 39.6 ft (12.1 m). She had four screws, each driven by a four-cylinder Doxford two-stroke diesel engine. The combined power output of her four engines was rated at 2,772 NHP, and gave her a speed of 17 knots (31 km/h), which enabled her to sail between New York and Hamilton in about 40 hours.

Furness, Withy registered the ship at Hamilton. Her UK official number was 65610 and her code letters were KWTQ. By 1930 her call sign was VPNC.

== Success ==
Bermuda had berths for 691 passengers: 616 in first class and 75 in second class. Her public areas included a cinema, stage, dance floors, swimming pool and gymnasium. She entered service in January 1928.

Furness, Withy had intended to run Bermuda between New York and Hamilton only seasonally, from December to May, and use her as a cruise ship for the rest of the year. But she proved so popular that the company kept her on the Bermuda route all year round.

== First fire ==
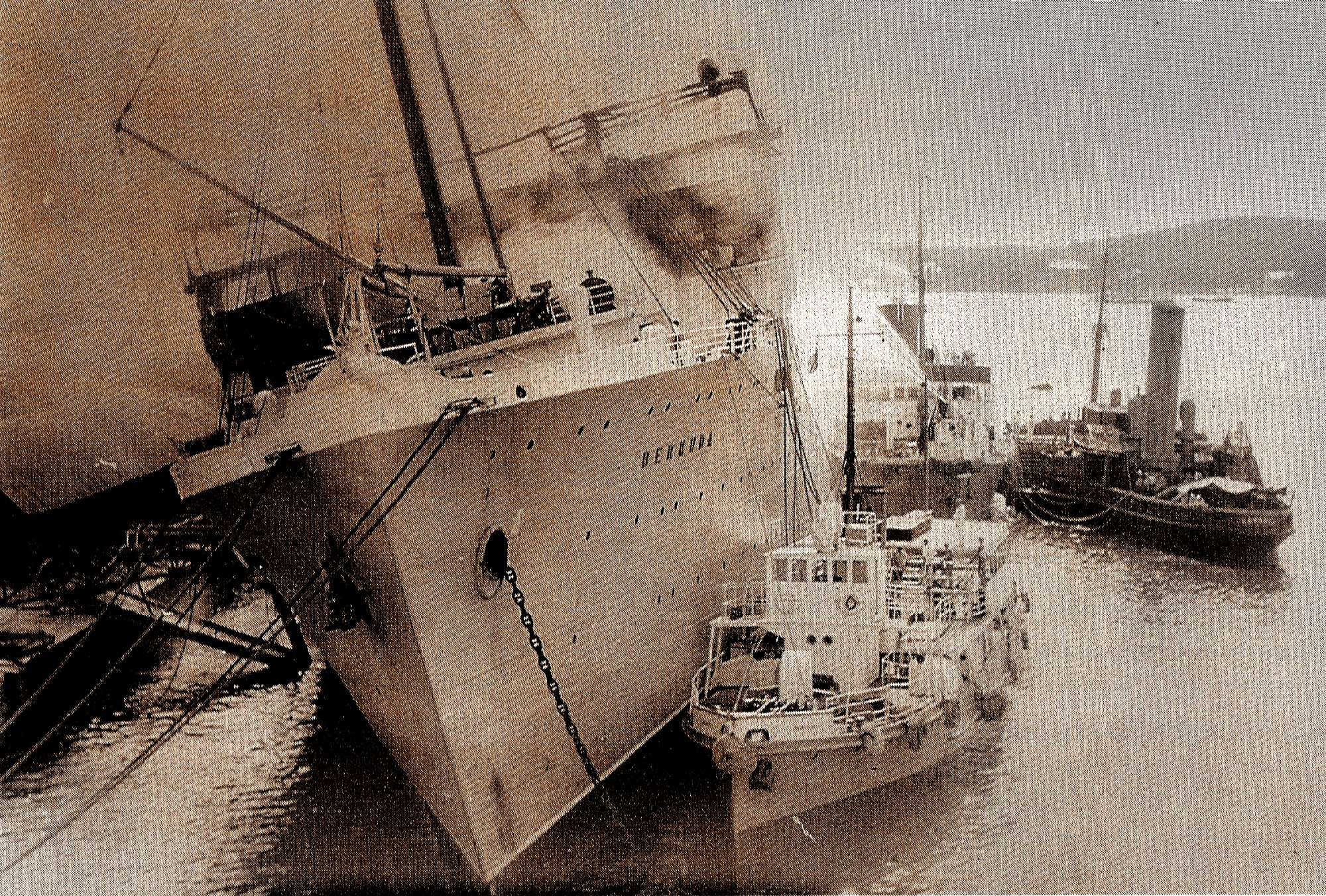
Tenders Castle Harbour and Bermudian with Royal Navy tugs Sandboy and Creole fight Bermuda fire, 17 June 1931

On 15 June 1931 Bermuda berthed at the quayside at No. 1 Shed Front Street in the City of Hamilton. On the night of 16 June, a fire was discovered in an empty cabin and doused by crew members. Two other fires, one in the bow and the other on the starboard side of the stern, were discovered at 03:00 on 17 June 1931. The ship was partly sunk by opening her seacocks, preventing the fire from reaching her lower decks or igniting her bunkers, but the upper decks were consumed and the fire threatened to spread to buildings on the opposite side of Front Street.

Hamilton Fire Brigade and the ship's crew were joined by soldiers and Royal Marines, and the fire was finally brought under control after sailors from the Royal Naval Dockyard arrived with asbestos suits and equipment and training for fighting fires on warships. From the harbour, the Furness, Withy tender Castle Harbour and the Royal Navy tugs Sandboy and Creole trained 30 hoses on Bermuda. Another Furness, Withy vessel, the tender Bermudian (Note: Bermudian was originally constructed as HMS Arctic Whale, and one of two Royal Navy vessels of the class sold into trade after the First World War that were operated commercially in Bermuda, the other having become John S. Darrell,) also came to help. The fire was brought under control after nearly four hours. One person, the ship's assistant barber, was killed in the fire, which gutted much of Bermuda's passenger accommodation. Her hull and main engines were undamaged, and she was towed back to Belfast, where Workman, Clark and Company began to rebuild her superstructure and overhaul her.

== Second fire ==
In November 1931 the restoration of Bermuda was nearly complete when she caught fire again. This fire was lower down in the ship, accessible only via narrow companionways that were full of smoke by the time the Belfast Fire Brigade arrived. The brigade fought the blaze but it spread, forcing firemen to withdraw from the ship after barely an hour.

The fire caused so much damage that the ship sank at the quayside. The wreck was raised on Christmas Eve 1931. Damage from the two fires was estimated to cost her underwriters £1.25 million. Workman, Clark bought the wreck, removed her engines and some of her fittings and sold her hulk for scrap. Furness, Withy replaced Bermuda with sister ships Queen of Bermuda and Monarch of Bermuda.

== Shipwreck ==
Metal Industries, Limited bought the hulk and planned to scrap her at Rosyth. In April 1933 the United Towing Company's 369 GRT steam tug Seaman started to tow Bermuda from Belfast around the north coast of Scotland to reach the Firth of Forth.

However, on 30 April 1933, her two tow lines broke, and Bermuda drifted ashore on the Badcall Islands in Eddrachillis Bay, Sutherland. Her tow lines were reattached and Seaman pulled her off the rocks, but the lines broke again. The hulk was washed further inshore, and grounded where she could not be refloated.

Much of the hulk was salvaged where she lay. But three large parts of her, particularly her stern, remain.

== Bibliography ==
- Burrell, David (1992). Furness Withy 1891–1991. Kendal: World Ship Society. ISBN 0-905617-70-3.
- Miller, William Jr (2001). Picture History of British Ocean Liners 1900 to the Present. Mineola: Dover Publications. p. 49. ISBN 0-486-41532-5.
- Wilson, RM (1956). The Big Ships. London: Cassell & Co. pp. 100–03, 217–18.
