= SS New Australia =

Passenger ship (launched 1931)

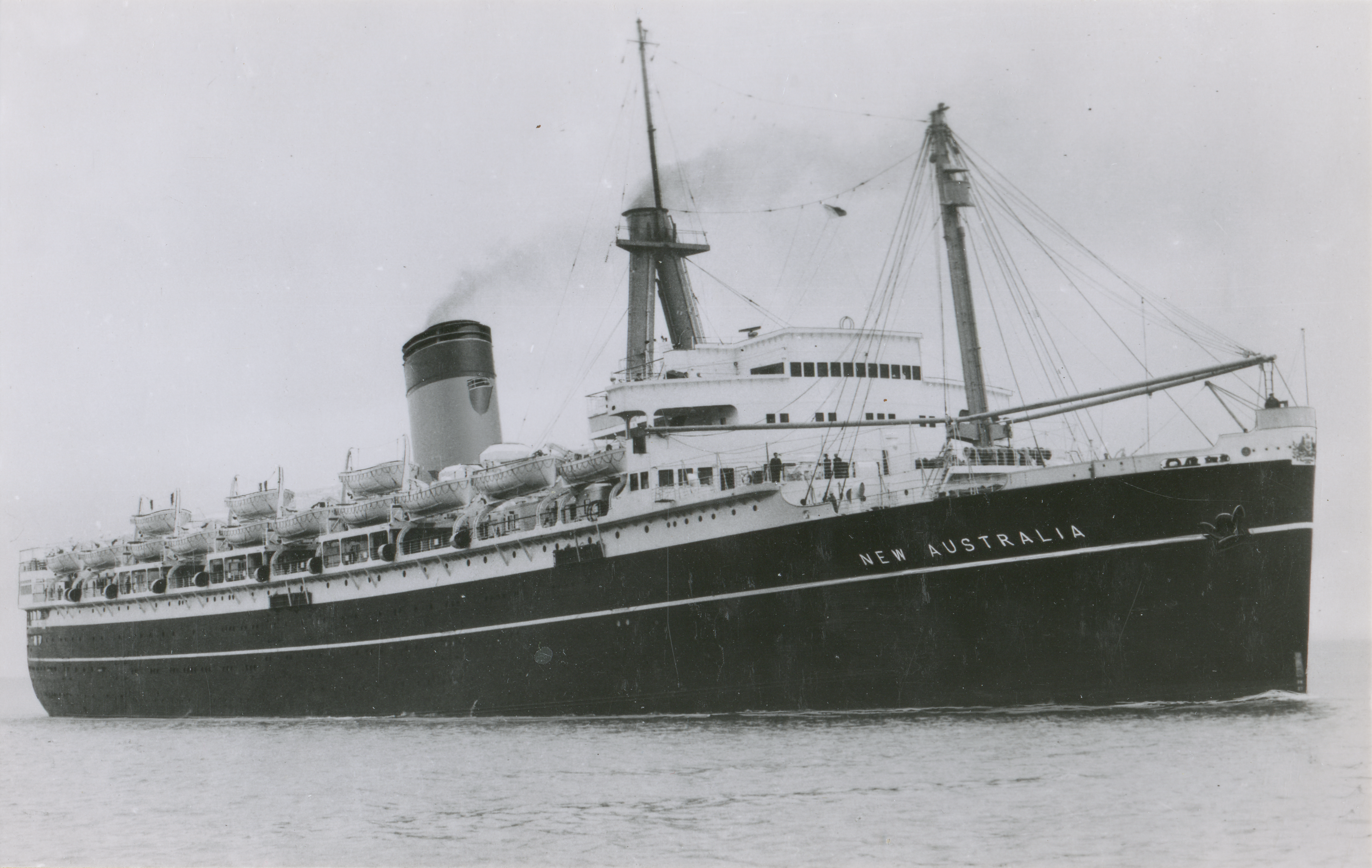
- New Australia

History
- Name: Monarch of Bermuda (1931–47); New Australia (1947–58); Arkadia (1958–66)
- Owner: Furness, Withy & Co Ltd (1931–49); Ministry of Transport (1949–58); Arcadia Steamship Corporation (1958–66)
- Operator: Furness Bermuda Line (1931–49); Shaw, Savill (1949–58); Greek Line (1958–66)
- Port of registry: Hamilton, Bermuda (1931–49)
- Route: New York – Hamilton (1931–39)
- Builder: Vickers-Armstrongs
- Yard number: 1
- Launched: 17 March 1931
- Completed: November 1931
- In service: 1931
- Out of service: 1966
- Identification: UK official number 162650; Code letters LHJD (1931–33); Call sign VJQM (1934–49)
- Fate: Scrapped

General characteristics
- Tonnage: 22,424 GRT (1931–49); 20,648 GRT (1958–66); tonnage under deck 13,088 (1931–49); 12,876 NRT (1931–49)
- Length: 553.2 ft (168.6 m) (1931–58); 590 ft (180 m) (1958–66)
- Beam: 76.7 ft (23.4 m)
- Draught: 27 ft (8.2 m)
- Depth: 39 ft (12 m)
- Installed power: 4,411 NHP
- Propulsion: 2 × steam turbines, electric generators & motors, 4 × screws
- Speed: 19 knots (35 km/h)
- Capacity: 830 passengers (1931–39); 1,600 passengers (1949–66)
- Sensors & processing systems: direction finding equipment; echo sounding equipment; gyrocompass; submarine signalling equipment
- Notes: sister ship: Queen of Bermuda

SS New Australia was a UK-built turbo-electric passenger steamship that had a varied career from 1931 to 1966. She was built as the ocean liner Monarch of Bermuda, was a troop ship in the Second World War and was damaged by fire in 1947.

She was then refitted to carry emigrants to Australia and renamed New Australia. In 1958 she was refitted again, renamed Arkadia and served as both a transatlantic liner and a cruise ship.

== History ==
=== Building ===
Vickers-Armstrongs built Monarch of Bermuda at its shipyard in Walker, Newcastle upon Tyne for Furness, Withy & Co Ltd. She was launched on 17 March 1931 and completed that November. She had a beam of 76.7 ft (23.4 m) and draught of 27 ft (8.2 m), and as built her length was 553.2 ft (168.6 m).

The ship had eight Babcock & Wilcox water-tube boilers with a combined heating surface of 42,200 square feet (3,921 m^{2}). The boilers supplied steam at 400 lb_{f}/in^{2} to two steam turbines. The turbines drove alternators that powered electric motors to drive her four screws, giving her a speed of 19 knots (35 km/h). GEC built her alternators and motors.

As built, Monarch of Bermuda was assessed as 22,424 GRT and 12,876 NRT. She had luxury berths for 830 passengers and capacity for refrigerated cargo.

=== Furness, Withy service ===
Furness Withy had Monarch of Bermuda built for its Furness Bermuda Line subsidiary. She operated a liner service between New York and Hamilton, Bermuda, following the loss of MV Bermuda (which was heavily damaged by fire at Hamilton on 17 June 1931, returned to the builders in Belfast for repairs but burned again, then was wrecked in Scotland while under tow to be scrapped). In 1933 Vickers-Armstrongs completed a sister ship, the 22,575 GRT Queen of Bermuda, which joined Monarch of Bermuda on the route.

In the early hours of 8 September 1934 Ward Line's 11,520 GRT liner Morro Castle caught fire eight miles off the coast of New Jersey. Monarch of Bermuda was one of several ships that diverted to help. The fire had spread so swiftly that many of Morro Castle's passengers were unable to reach her lifeboats. Some leapt into the sea, and Monarch of Bermuda managed to rescue some of them.

In the Second World War Monarch of Bermuda served as a troop ship.

=== Rebuilding and Shaw, Savill service ===
After the war Palmers' shipyard in Hebburn started refitting Monarch of Bermuda for her return to civilian service, but on 24 May 1947 she was gutted by fire. She was sold for scrap, but the Ministry of Transport bought her and contracted JI Thornycroft & Co to refit her with economy accommodation for 1,600 passengers.

The ship originally had three funnels. Thornycroft rebuilt her with a single funnel, plus an unusual bipod structure aft of her bridge that served as both a funnel and a mainmast. The MoT renamed her New Australia, contracted Shaw, Savill & Albion Line to manage her and put her into service carrying UK emigrants to Australia. She plied this trade from 1950 until 1957.

In September 1958 New Australia was serving as a troop ship again when she suffered slight damage in a collision with a tanker in the Torres Strait.

=== Refitting and Greek Line service ===
In 1958 the MoT sold the ship to Ornos Shipping Co Ltd of London, who sold her on to the Arcadia Steamship Corporation. This was part of Greek Line, who had Blohm & Voss in Hamburg repair and refit her. Her foremast was replaced with two king-posts. Her forepeak had been damaged in the collision, so it was remodelled to give her a curved stem. This increased her length to 590 ft (180 m). She was now 20,648 GRT.

Greek Line renamed the ship Arkadia and used her on both the transatlantic liner trade to Canada and cruises for most of the 1960s.

Arkadia's final voyage was to Valencia in Spain, where she arrived on 18 December 1966 to be scrapped.

== Bibliography ==
- Hardy, AC (8 September 1936). "Bermudian Luxury Liners". Shipping Wonders of the World (Part 31): 970–974.
- Harnack, Edwin P (1938) [1903]. All About Ships & Shipping (7th ed.). London: Faber and Faber.
- Harnack, Edwin P (1964) [1903]. All About Ships & Shipping (11th ed.). London: Faber and Faber.
- Miller, William Jr (2001). Picture History of British Ocean Liners 1900 to the Present. Mineola: Dover Publications. p. 87. ISBN 0-486-41532-5.
- Wilson, RM (1956). The Big Ships. London: Cassell & Co. pp. 100–03, 115–16, 217.
