= SS Ocean Monarch (1950) =

British-built passenger steamship

Coordinates: 37°57′N 23°33′E

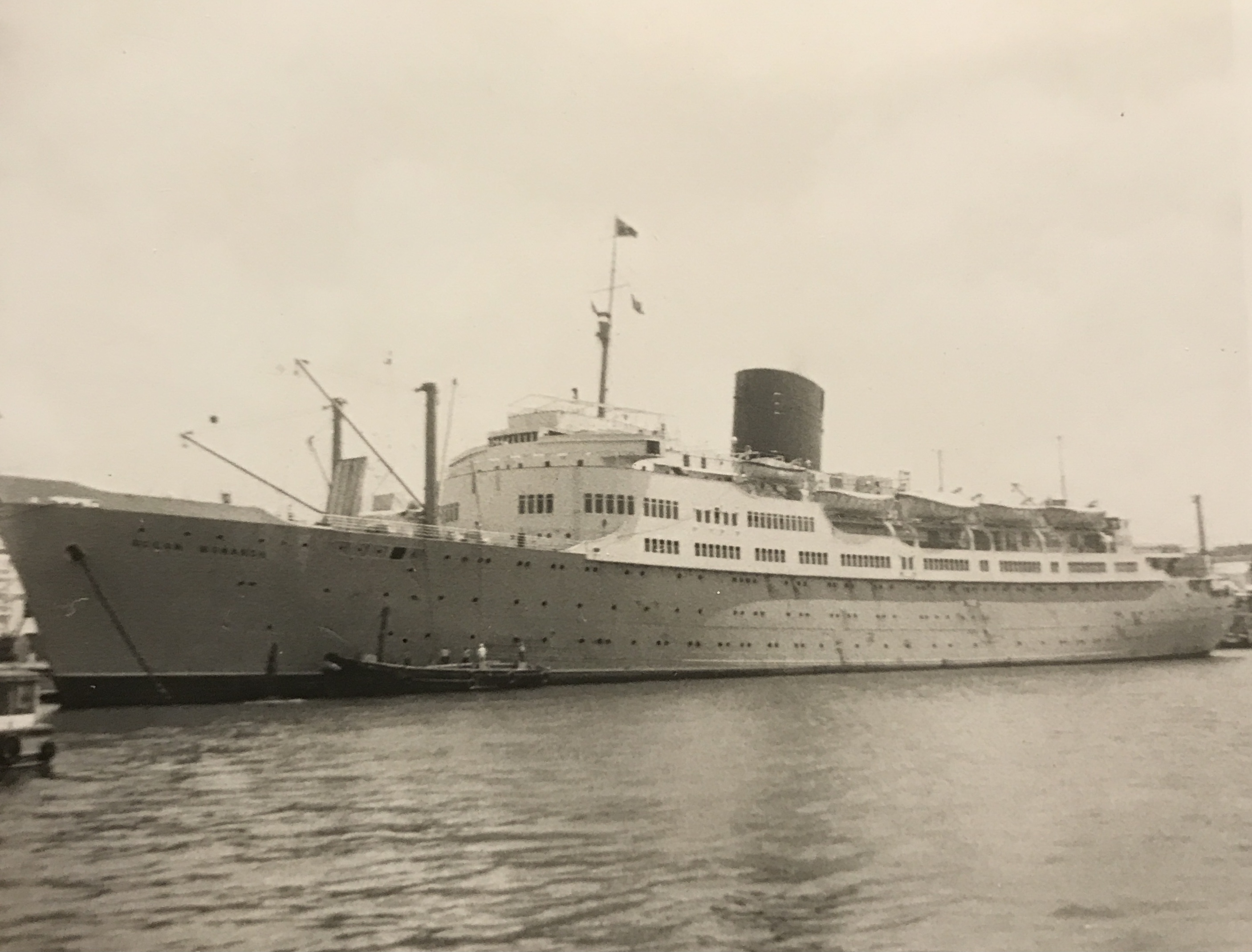

History

United Kingdom
- Name: Ocean Monarch (1951–67); Varna (1967–77); Venus (1977); Riviera (1977–81); Reina del Mar (1981)
- Owner: Furness, Withy (1951–67); Navigation Maritime Bulgare (1967–73); Sovereign Cruises (1973–78); Dolphon (Hellas); Shipping SA, Piraeus (1978–81)
- Operator: Furness Bermuda Line (1951–66); Balkantourist (1967–73); Sovereign Cruises (1973); S P Magliveras, Greece (1978–79); Trans-Tirreno Express (1979–81)
- Port of registry: (United Kingdom) London (1951–67); (Bulgaria) Varna (1967–73); (Greece) Piraeus (1973–81)
- Route: New York – Nassau – Bermuda (1951–67)
- Builder: Vickers-Armstrong, High Walker
- Cost: £2,500,000
- Yard number: 119
- Launched: 27 July 1950
- Completed: March 1951
- Maiden voyage: 3 May 1951
- Out of service: Laid up 1966–67; Laid up 1970–73; Laid up 1973–78
- Identification: UK official number 184384 (1951–67); call sign GJXD (1951–67); IMO number: 5260447
- Honours and awards: American Academy of Designing Gold Medal
- Fate: Caught fire & sank, 1981

General characteristics
- Type: ocean liner
- Tonnage: 13,654 GRT, 7,135 NRT, 4,905 DWT
- Length: 561 ft 1 in (171.02 m) overall; 491.4 ft (149.8 m) registered
- Beam: 72.2 ft (22.0 m)
- Draught: 24 ft 0 in (7.32 m)
- Depth: 35.8 ft (10.9 m)
- Decks: 10
- Installed power: 11,500 shp
- Propulsion: 4 × steam turbines; double-reduction gearing; 2 × screws
- Speed: 18 knots (33 km/h)
- Capacity: 414 × 1st class passengers
- Crew: about 250
- Sensors & processing systems: wireless direction finding, echo sounding device, gyrocompass, radar

Ocean Monarch was a passenger steamship that was built by Vickers-Armstrongs in 1950. She served with Furness Bermuda Line for fifteen years, then with a Bulgarian company for three years, renamed Varna. She spent much of the 1970s laid up and was renamed Venus and then Riviera. In the early 1980s, she was renamed Reina del Mar and refitted for further use as a cruise ship, but a fire gutted her; and she was scuttled on 1 June 1981 after another fire broke out.

== History ==
Ocean Monarch was built by Vickers-Armstrongs Ltd, High Walker, at a cost of £2,500,000. She was yard number 119, and was launched on 27 July 1950, with completion in March 1951. She was the first postwar-built ship designed especially for the American cruise market. Accommodations were for 414 first class passengers only. Ocean Monarch was awarded a gold medal by the American Institute for Designing for her "outstanding beauty and unusual design features of a cruise ship".

Ocean Monarch served the New York – Bermuda route. As well as conveying passengers she was used to supply fresh drinking water to the island. She served with Furness Withy via subsidiary Furness Bermuda Line until 1966. On 22 September she was laid up in the River Fal, Cornwall.

In 1967, she was sold to Navigation Maritime Bulgare and renamed Varna. Operated by Balkantourist, Varna, She was used on cruises from Montreal, Canada. Varna was laid up in 1970 at Perama, Greece. In 1973, Varna was chartered by Sovereign Cruises, but only made two voyages with them. She was then laid up again. Her name was changed to Venus in 1977, and Riviera in 1978. in 1979, she was refurbished for use by Trans-Tirreno Express.

She was chartered by SUR-Seereisen, Germany, who announced a series of Mediterranean cruises to take place in summer 1981. Her name was changed to Reina del Mar. Before these cruises took place the ship was renovated. On 28 May 1981, a fire broke out which completely gutted the passenger accommodation. The ship was towed out of Ambelakia, where the renovation was being carried out. The tow parted and Reina del Mar ran aground on Salamina Island. After being refloated, she was moored near Rasa Sayang, which had also been gutted by fire. On 1 June 1981, a new fire broke out on Reina del Mar, and she was then scuttled off Kynosoura.

== Description and propulsion ==
The ship had a crew of about 250 and had berths for up to 414 passengers, all first class. Her length overall was 561 feet 1 inch (171.02 m), and her beam was 72.2 ft (22.0 m).

== Bibliography ==
- Burrell, David (1992). Furness Withy 1891–1991. Kendal: World Ship Society. ISBN 0-905617-70-3.
- Mitchell, WH; Sawyer, LA (1967). Cruising Ships. New York: Doubleday.
