= British Army =

Land warfare force of the United Kingdom

- Badge of the British Army Logo since 2018
- Founded: 1 April 1707; 319 years ago (Note: English/Scottish parliamentary control of separate entities prior to 1707; British parliamentary control since 1 April 1707.)
- Country: United Kingdom
- Type: Army
- Role: Land warfare
- Size: 74,370 regular forces personnel (April 2026); 4,460 Gurkhas (April 2026); 25,730 volunteer reserve personnel (April 2026); 4,920 other personnel (April 2026)
- Part of: British Armed Forces
- General Staff Offices: Whitehall, London
- March: List of marches of the British Army
- Equipment: List of equipment of the British Army
- Website: www.army.mod.uk

Commanders
- Head of the Armed Forces: King Charles III
- Chief of the General Staff: General Sir Roland Walker
- Deputy Chief of the General Staff: Lieutenant General Sir Simon Hamilton
- Assistant Chief of the General Staff: Major General Jonathan Swift

Insignia
- War flag

- Non-ceremonial flag

The British Army is the land warfare force of the United Kingdom responsible for defending the UK, the British Overseas Territories and Crown Dependencies. The British Army, founded in 1707, has seen involvement in most of the world's major wars throughout history, including both world wars.

The British Army traces back to 1707 and the formation of the united Kingdom of Great Britain which joined the Kingdoms of England and Scotland into a single state and, with that, united the English Army and the Scots Army as the British Army. The English Bill of Rights 1689 and Scottish Claim of Right Act 1689 require parliamentary consent for the Crown to maintain a peacetime standing army. Members of the British Army swear allegiance to the monarch as their commander-in-chief. The army is administered by the Ministry of Defence and commanded by the Chief of the General Staff.

At its inception, being composed primarily of cavalry and infantry, the British Army was one of two Regular Forces (there were also separate Reserve Forces) within the British military (those parts of the British Armed Forces tasked with land warfare, as opposed to the naval forces), with the other having been the Ordnance Military Corps (made up of the Royal Artillery, Royal Engineers, and the Royal Sappers and Miners) of the Board of Ordnance, which along with the originally civilian Commissariat Department, stores and supply departments, as well as barracks and other departments, were absorbed into the British Army when the Board of Ordnance was abolished in 1855. Various other civilian departments of the board were absorbed into the War Office.

The British Army has seen action in major wars between the world's great powers, including the Seven Years' War, the Napoleonic Wars, the Crimean War and the First and Second World Wars. Britain's victories in most of these decisive wars allowed it to influence world events and establish itself as one of the world's leading military and economic powers. Since the end of the Cold War, the British Army has been deployed to a number of conflict zones, often as part of an expeditionary force, a coalition force or part of a United Nations peacekeeping operation.

== History ==
=== Background ===
Until the Wars of the Three Kingdoms (1639–1653), neither England nor Scotland had a standing army with professional officers and career corporals and sergeants. England relied on militia organised by local officials or private forces mobilised by the nobility, or on hired mercenaries from Europe. From the later Middle Ages until the Wars of the Three Kingdoms, when a foreign expeditionary force was needed, such as the one that King Henry V of England took to France and that fought at the Battle of Agincourt (1415), the army, a professional one, was raised for the duration of the expedition.

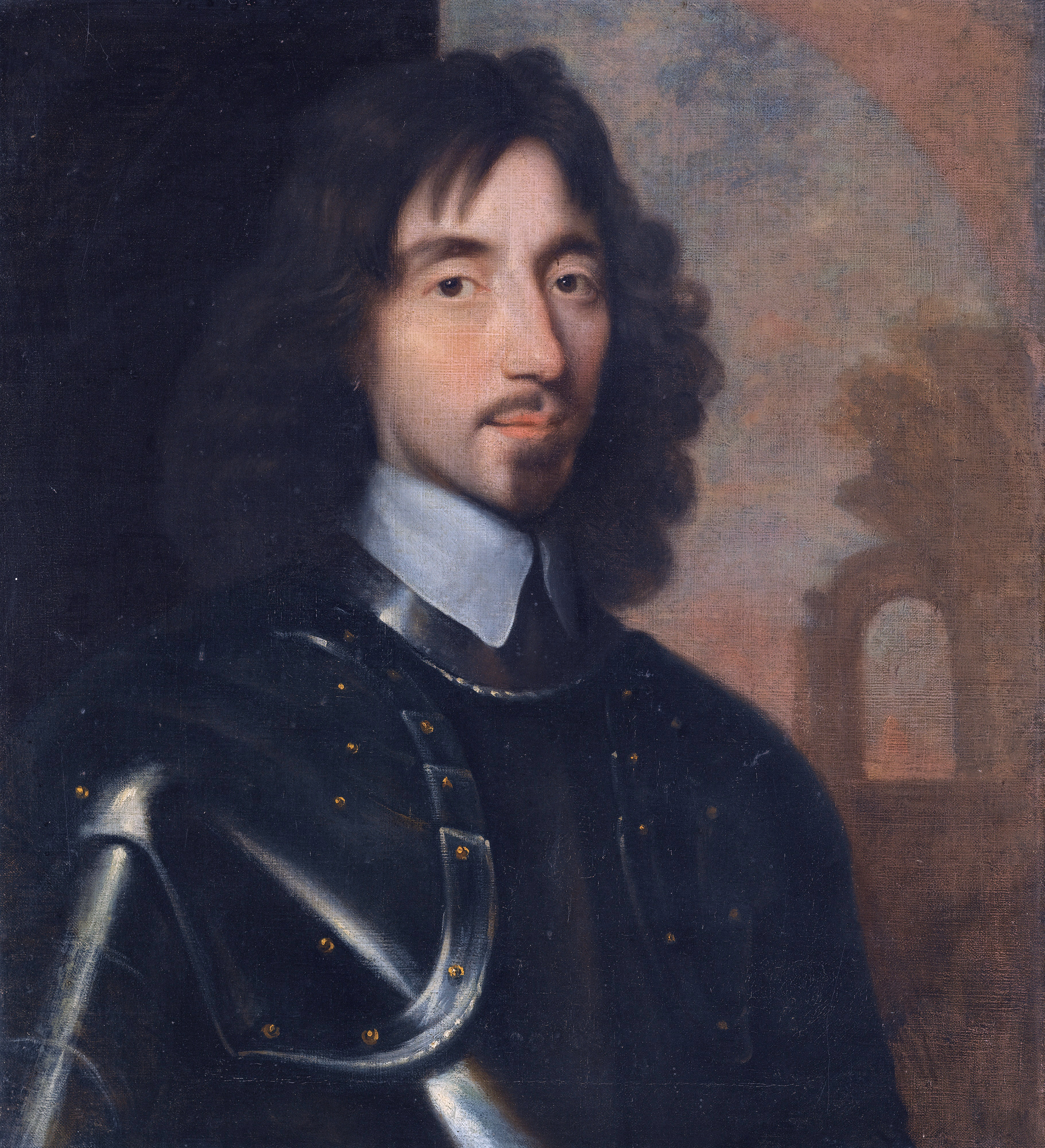
Lord Protector Oliver Cromwell (left) Lord General Thomas Fairfax, the first commander of the New Model Army (right)

During the Wars of the Three Kingdoms, the members of the English Long Parliament realised that the use of county militia organised into regional associations (such as the Eastern Association), often commanded by local members of Parliament (both from the House of Commons and the House of Lords), while more than able to hold their own in the regions which Parliamentarians ('Roundheads") controlled, were unlikely to win the war. So Parliament initiated two actions. The Self-denying Ordinance forbade members of Parliament (with the notable exception of Oliver Cromwell, then a member of parliament and future Lord Protector) from serving as officers in the Parliamentary armies. This created a distinction between the civilians in Parliament, who tended to be Presbyterian and conciliatory to the Royalists ("Cavaliers") in nature, and a corps of professional officers, who tended to be Independent (Congregational) in theology. The second action was legislation for the creation of a Parliamentary-funded army, commanded by Lord General Thomas Fairfax, which became known as the New Model Army (originally phrased "new-modelled Army").

While this proved to be a war-winning formula, the New Model Army, being organised and politically active, went on to dominate the politics of the Interregnum and by 1660 was widely disliked. The New Model Army was paid off and disbanded at the later Restoration of the monarchy in 1660 with the accession of King Charles II. For many decades the alleged excesses of the New Model Army under the Protectorate / Commonwealth under Oliver Cromwell were used as propaganda (and still feature in Irish folklore) and the Whig Party element recoiled from allowing a standing army to continue with the agreed-upon rights and privileges under the return of a king. The militia acts of 1661 and 1662 prevented local authorities from calling up militia and oppressing their own local opponents. Calling up the militia was possible only if the king and local elites agreed to do so.

King Charles II and his "Cavalier" / Royalist supporters favoured a new army under royal control, and immediately after the Restoration of 1660 to 1661 began working on its establishment. The first English Army regiments, including elements of the disbanded New Model Army, were formed between November 1660 and January 1661 and became a standing military force for England (financed by Parliament). The Royal Scots and Irish Armies were financed by the parliaments of Scotland and Ireland. Parliamentary control was established by the Bill of Rights 1689 and Claim of Right Act 1689, although the monarch continued to influence aspects of army administration until at least the end of the 19th century.

After the Restoration, King Charles II pulled together four regiments of infantry and cavalry, calling them his guards, at a cost of £122,000 from his general budget. This became the foundation of the permanent English Army. By 1685, it had grown to number 7,500 soldiers in marching regiments, and 1,400 men permanently stationed in garrisons. A Monmouth Rebellion in 1685 allowed successor King James II to raise the forces to 20,000 men. There were 37,000 in 1678, when England played a role in the closing stage of the cross-channel Franco-Dutch War. After Protestant dual Monarchs William III, formerly William of the Dutch House of Orange, and his wife Mary II's joint accession to the throne after a short constitutional crisis with Parliament sending Mary's father, predecessor King James II, (who remained a Catholic) during his brief controversial reign, off the throne and into exile. England then involved itself in the War of the Grand Alliance on the Continent, primarily to prevent a possible French Catholic monarch organizing an invasion restoring the exiled James II (Queen Mary's father and still a Roman Catholic). Later in 1689, William III to solidify his and Mary's hold on the monarchy, expanded the new English army to 74,000, and then a few years later to 94,000 in 1694. Parliament was very nervous and reduced the cadre to 70,000 in 1697. Scotland and Ireland had theoretically separate military establishments, but they were unofficially merged with the English Crown force.

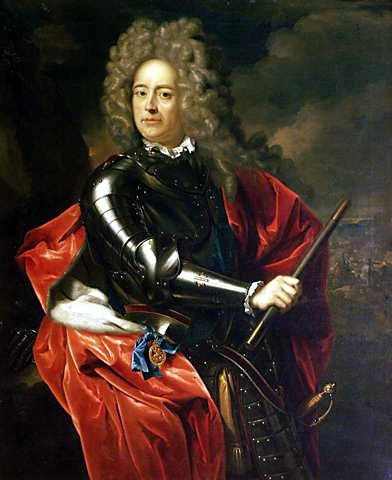
John Churchill, 1st Duke of Marlborough, was one of the first generals in the new British Army and fought in the War of the Spanish Succession. He was a noted ancestor of Sir Winston Churchill, later famous Prime Minister during World War II.

=== Formation ===
By the time of the 1707 Acts of Union, many regiments of the English and Scottish armies were already combined under one operational command and stationed in the Netherlands for the War of the Spanish Succession. Although all the regiments were now part of the new British military establishment, they remained under the old operational-command structure and retained much of the institutional ethos, customs and traditions of the standing armies created shortly after the Restoration of the Monarchy 47 years earlier. The order of seniority of the most-senior British Army line regiments is based on that of the earlier English army. Although technically the Scots Royal Regiment of Foot was raised in 1633 and is the oldest Regiment of the Line, Scottish and Irish regiments were only allowed to take a rank in the English army on the date of their arrival in England (or the date when they were first placed on the English establishment). In 1694, a board of general officers was convened to decide the rank of English, Irish and Scots regiments serving in the Netherlands; the regiment which became known as the Scots Greys were designated the 4th Dragoons because there were three English regiments raised prior to 1688 when the Scots Greys were first placed in the English establishment. In 1713, when a new board of general officers was convened to decide the rank of several regiments, the seniority of the Scots Greys was reassessed and based on their June 1685 entry into England. At that time there was only one English regiment of dragoons, and the Scots Greys eventually received the British Army rank of 2nd Dragoons.

=== British Empire (1707–1914) ===
After 1707, British continental policy was to contain expansion by competing powers such as France and Spain. Although Spain was the dominant global power during the previous two centuries and the chief threat to England's early trans-Atlantic colonial ambitions, its influence was now waning. The territorial ambitions of the French, however, led to the War of the Spanish Succession and the later Napoleonic Wars.

Although the Royal Navy is widely regarded as vital to the rise of the British Empire, the British Army played an important role in the formation of colonies, protectorates and dominions in the Americas, Africa, Asia, India and Australasia. British soldiers captured strategically important sites and territories, with the army involved in wars to secure the empire's borders, internal safety and support friendly governments and princes. Among these actions were the French and Indian War / Seven Years' War, the American Revolutionary War, the Napoleonic Wars, the First and Second Opium Wars, the Boxer Rebellion, the New Zealand Wars, the Australian frontier wars, the Sepoy Rebellion of 1857, the first and second Boer Wars, the Fenian raids, the Irish War of Independence, interventions in Afghanistan (intended to maintain a buffer state between British India and the Russian Empire) and the Crimean War (to keep the Russian Empire to the north on the Black Sea at a safe distance by aiding the Ottoman Empire). Like the English Army, the British Army fought the kingdoms of Spain, France (including the First French Empire) and the Netherlands (Dutch Republic) for supremacy in North America and the West Indies. With native and provincial and colonial assistance, the Army conquered New France in the French and Indian War (North American theatre) of the parallel Seven Years' War and suppressed a Native / Indian North Americans uprising in Pontiac's War around the Great Lakes. The British Army was defeated in the American Revolutionary War, losing the Thirteen Colonies but retaining The Canadas and The Maritimes as in British North America, including Bermuda (originally part of the Colony of Virginia, and which had been originally strongly sympathetic to the American colonial rebels early in the war).

Halifax, Nova Scotia and Bermuda were to become Imperial fortresses (although Bermuda, being safer from attack over water and impervious to attack overland, quickly became the most important in British North America), along with Malta and Gibraltar, providing bases in the eastern Atlantic Ocean and Mediterranean Sea for Royal Navy squadrons to control the oceans and trade routes, and heavily garrisoned by the British Army both for defence of the bases and to provide mobile military forces to work with the Navy in amphibious operations throughout their regions.

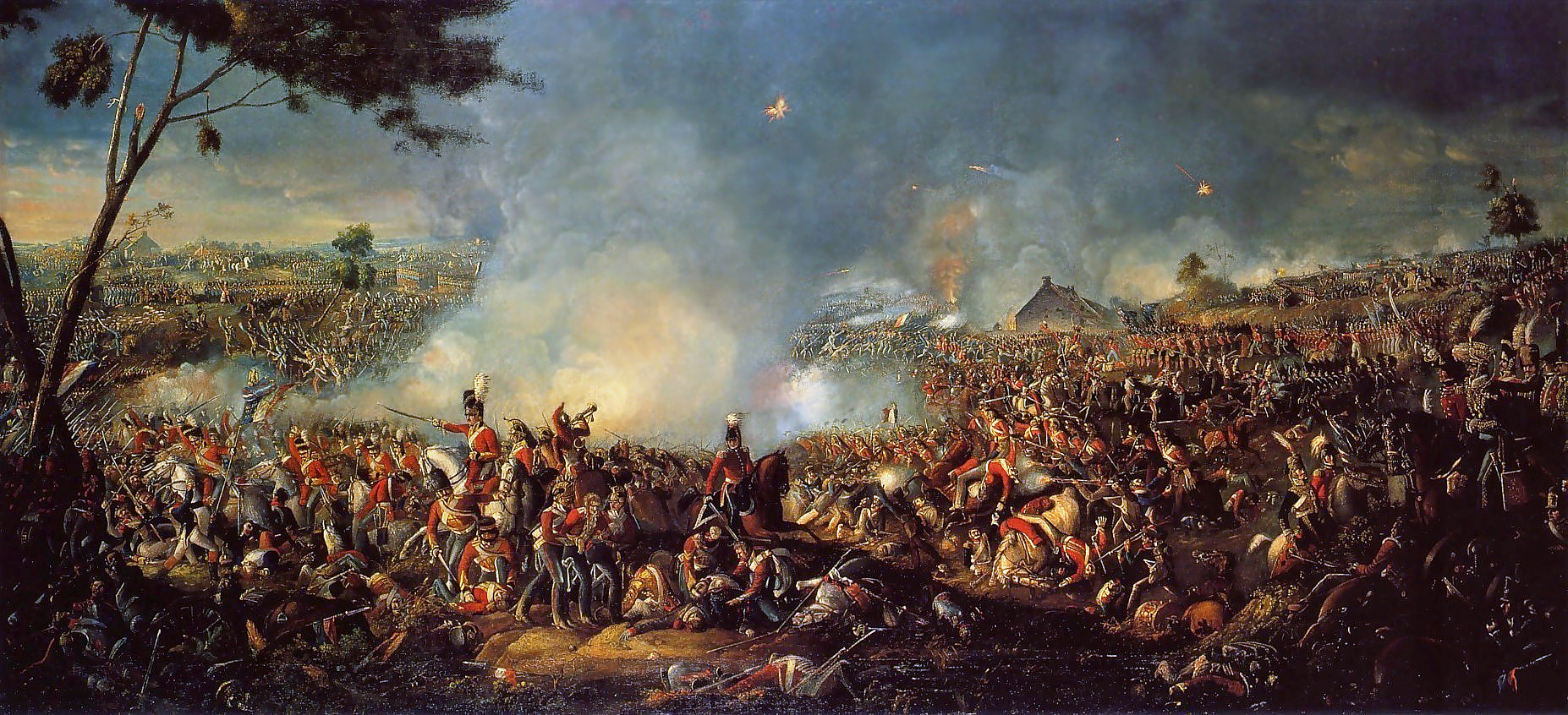
The Duke of Wellington and Field Marshal von Blücher's triumph over Napoleon Bonaparte at the Battle of Waterloo

The British Army was heavily involved in the Napoleonic Wars, participating in a number of campaigns in Europe (including continuous deployment in the Peninsular War), the Caribbean, North Africa and North America. The war between the British and the First French Empire of Napoleon Bonaparte stretched around the world; at its peak in 1813, the regular army contained over 250,000 men. A coalition of Anglo-Dutch and Prussian armies under the Duke of Wellington and Field Marshal von Blücher finally defeated Napoleon at Waterloo in 1815.

The English were involved politically and militarily in Ireland. The campaign of English republican Protector Oliver Cromwell involved uncompromising treatment of the Irish towns (most notably Drogheda and Wexford) which supported the Royalists during the English Civil War. The English Army (and the subsequent British Army) remained in Ireland primarily to suppress Irish revolts or disorder. In addition to its conflict with Irish nationalists, it was faced with the prospect of battling Anglo-Irish and Ulster Scots in Ireland who were angered by unfavourable taxation of Irish produce imported into Britain. With other Irish groups, they raised a volunteer army and threatened to emulate the American colonists if their conditions were not met. Learning from their experience in America, the British government sought a political solution. The British Army fought Irish rebels—Protestant and Catholic—primarily in Ulster and Leinster (Wolfe Tone's United Irishmen) in the 1798 rebellion.

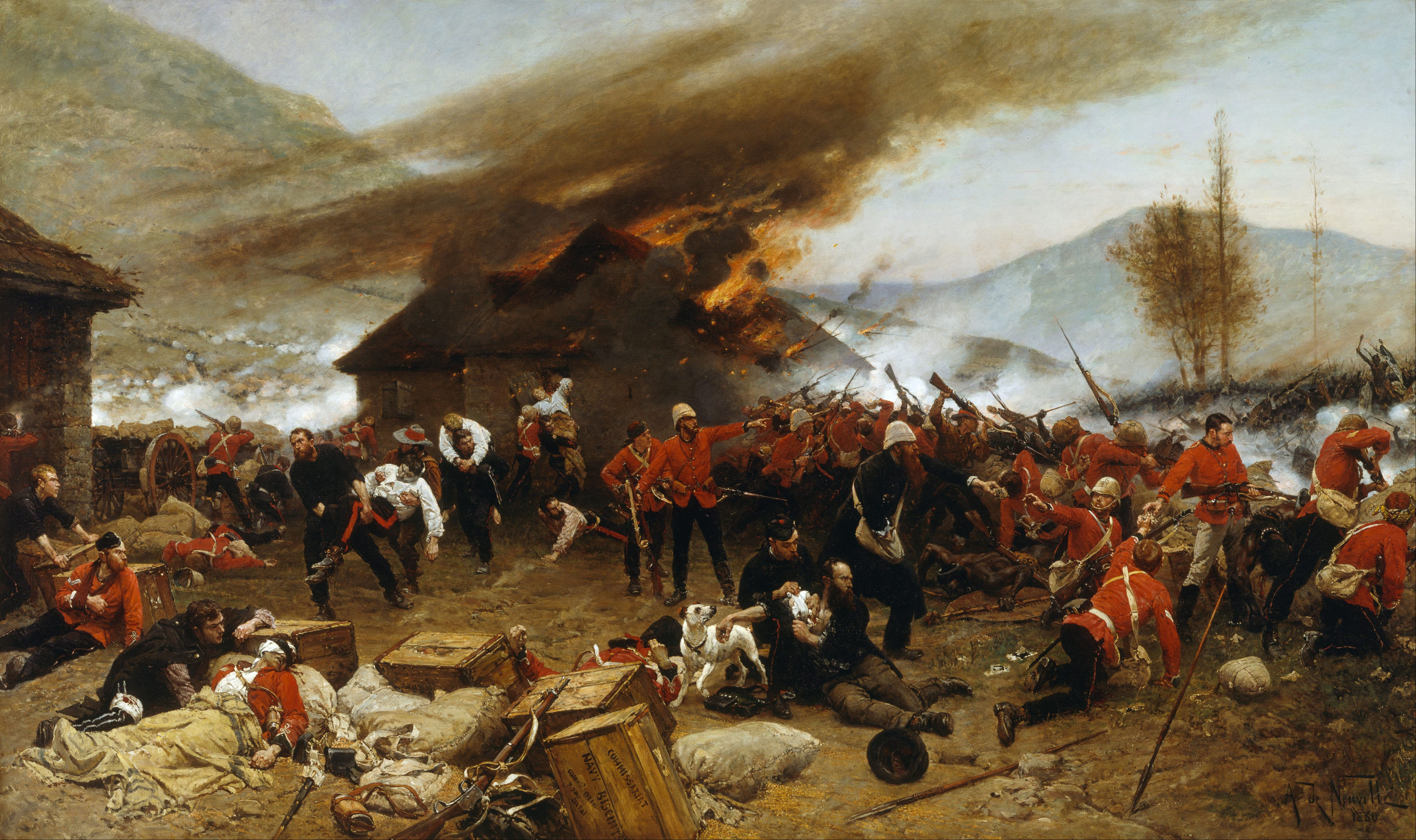
In the 1879 Battle of Rorke's Drift, a small British force repelled an attack by overwhelming Zulu forces; eleven Victoria Crosses were awarded for its defence.

In addition to battling the armies of other European empires (and its former colonies, the United States, in the War of 1812), the British Army fought the Chinese in the First and Second Opium Wars and the Boxer Rebellion, Māori tribes in the first of the New Zealand Wars, Nawab Shiraj-ud-Daula's forces and British East India Company mutineers in the Sepoy Rebellion of 1857, the Boers in the first and second Boer Wars, Irish Fenians in Canada during the Fenian raids and Irish separatists in the Anglo-Irish War. The increasing demands of imperial expansion and the inadequacy and inefficiency of the underfunded British Army, Militia, Ordnance Military Corps, Yeomanry and Volunteer Force after the Napoleonic Wars led to series of reforms following the failures of the Crimean War.

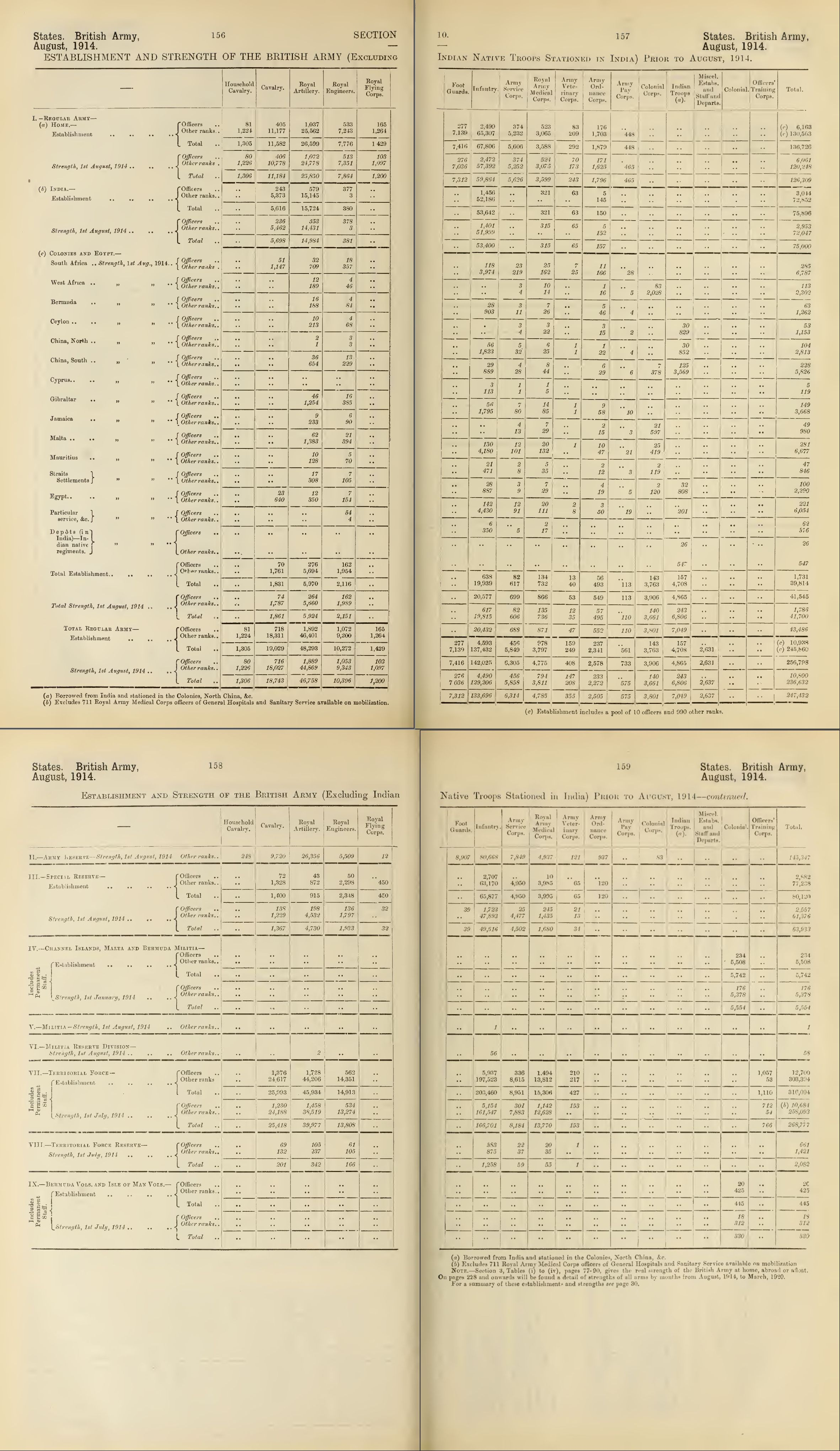
Establishment and strength of the British Army, excluding Indian native troops stationed in India, prior to August 1914

Inspired by the successes of the Prussian Army (which relied on short-term conscription of all eligible young men to maintain a large reserve of recently discharged soldiers, ready to be recalled on the outbreak of war to immediately bring the small peacetime regular army up to strength), the Regular Reserve of the British Army was originally created in 1859 by Secretary of State for War Sidney Herbert, and re-organised under the Reserve Force Act 1867. Prior to this, a soldier was generally enlisted into the British Army for a 21-year engagement, following which (should he survive so long) he was discharged as a Pensioner. Pensioners were sometimes still employed on garrison duties, as were younger soldiers no longer deemed fit for expeditionary service who were generally organised in invalid units or returned to the regimental depot for home service. The cost of paying pensioners, and the obligation the government was under to continue to employ invalids as well as soldiers deemed by their commanding officers as detriments to their units were motivations to change this system. The long period of engagement also discouraged many potential recruits. The long service enlistments were consequently replaced with short service enlistments, with undesirable soldiers not permitted to re-engage on the completion of their first engagement. The size of the army also fluctuated greatly, increasing in war time, and drastically shrinking with peace. Battalions posted on garrison duty overseas were allowed an increase on their normal peacetime establishment, which resulted in their having surplus men on their return to a Home station. Consequently, soldiers engaging on short term enlistments were enabled to serve several years with the colours and the remainder in the Regular Reserve, remaining liable for recall to the colours if required. Among the other benefits, this thereby enabled the British Army to have a ready pool of recently trained men to draw upon in an emergency. The name of the Regular Reserve (which for a time was divided into a First Class and a Second Class) has resulted in confusion with the Reserve Forces, which were the pre-existing part-time, local-service home-defence forces that were auxiliary to the British Army (or Regular Force), but not originally part of it: the Yeomanry, Militia (or Constitutional Force) and Volunteer Force. These were consequently also referred to as Auxiliary Forces or Local Forces.

The late-19th-century Cardwell and Childers Reforms gave the army its modern shape and redefined its regimental system. The 1907 Haldane Reforms created the Territorial Force as the army's volunteer reserve component, merging and reorganising the Volunteer Force and Yeomanry, while the Militia was replaced by the Special Reserve.

=== World Wars (1914–1945) ===
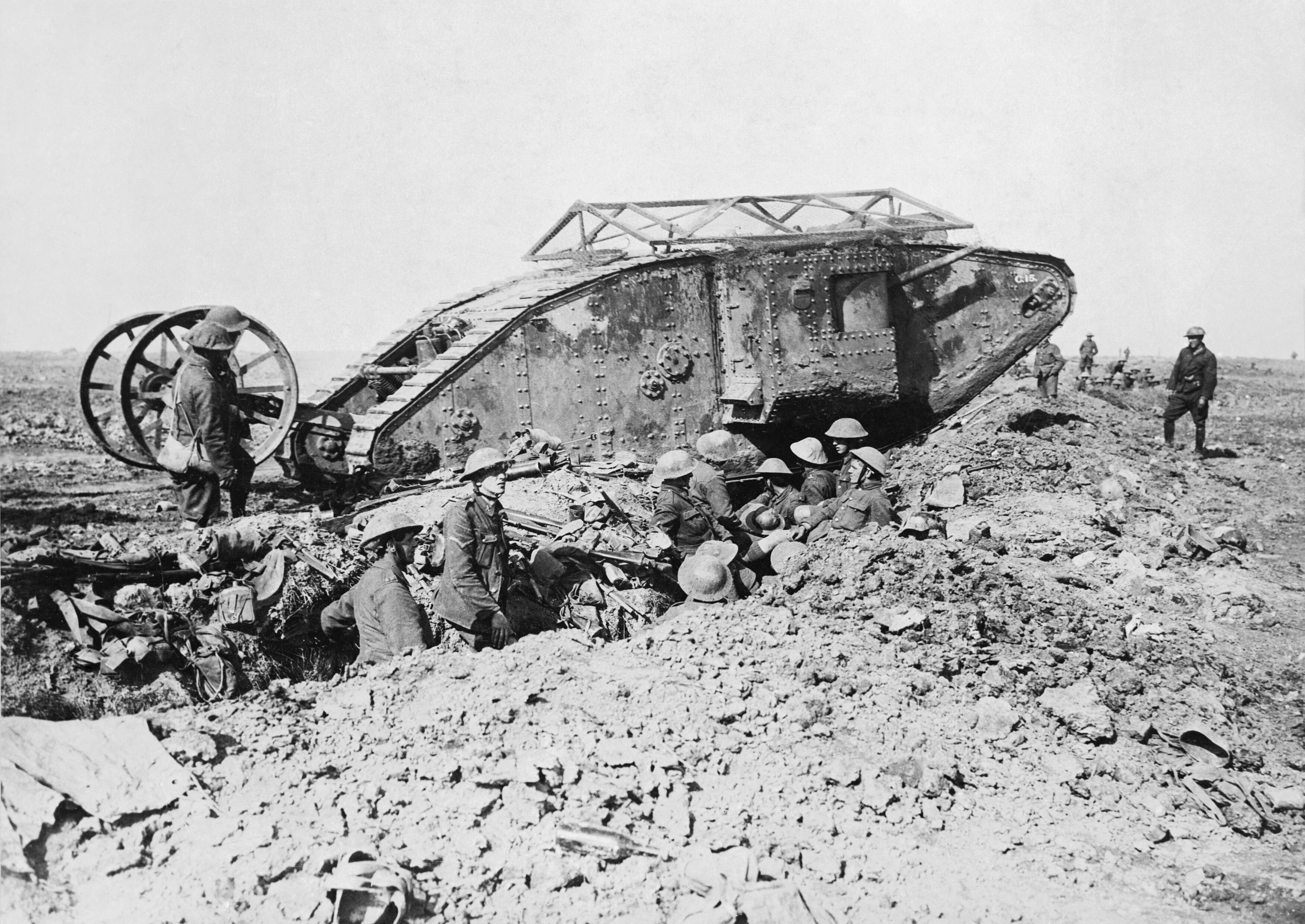
British First World War Mark I tank; the guidance wheels behind the main body were later scrapped as unnecessary. Armoured vehicles of the era required considerable infantry and artillery support. (Photo by Ernest Brooks)

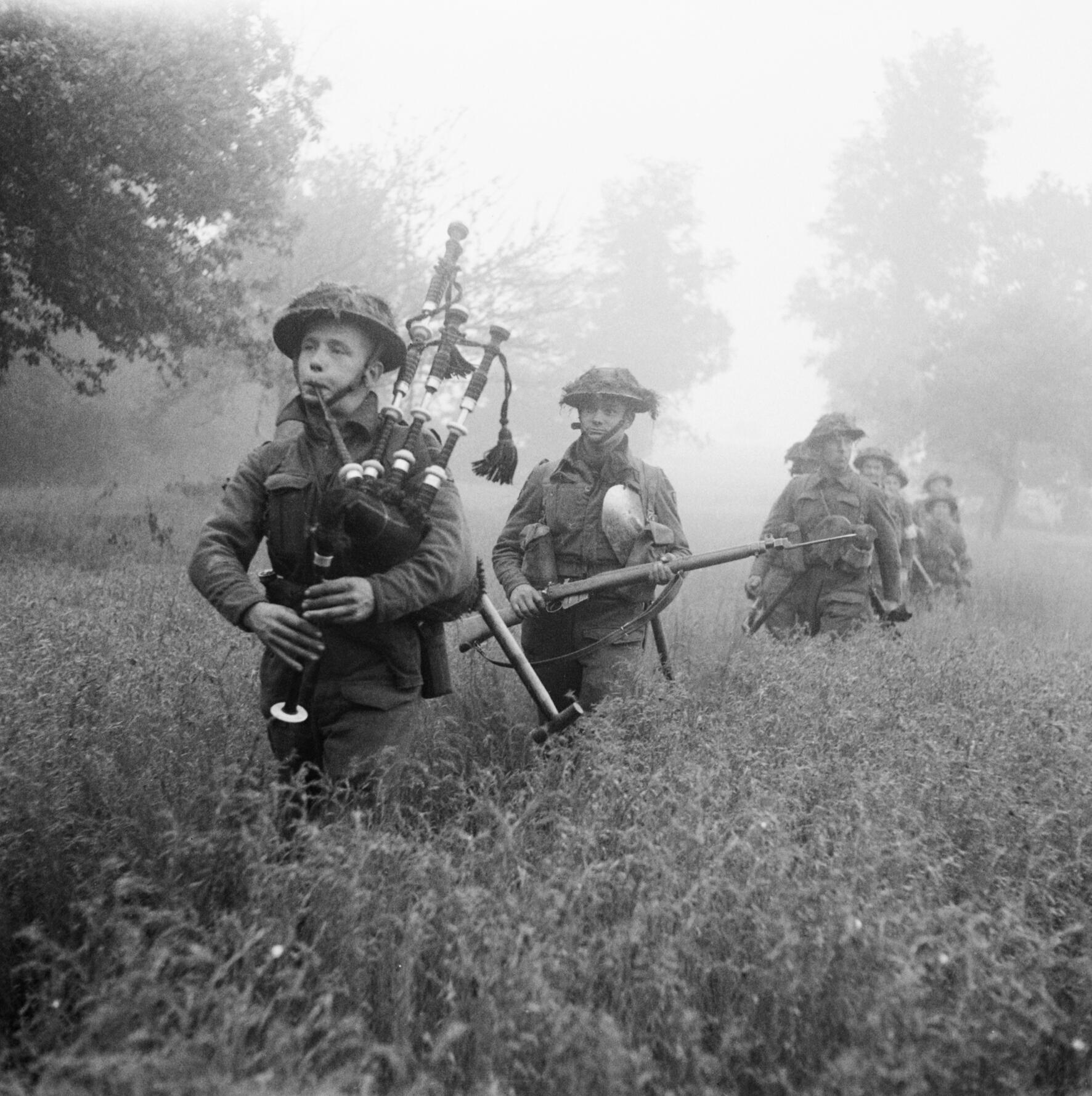
Led by their piper, men of the 7th Battalion, Seaforth Highlanders (part of the 46th (Highland) Brigade), advance through Normandy during Operation Epsom on 26 June 1944

Great Britain was challenged by other powers, primarily the German Empire and Nazi Germany, during the 20th century. A century earlier it vied with Napoleonic France for global pre-eminence, and Hanoverian Britain's natural allies were the kingdoms and principalities of northern Germany. By the middle of the 19th century, Britain and France were allies in preventing Russia's appropriation of the Ottoman Empire, although the fear of French invasion led shortly afterwards to the creation of the Volunteer Force. By the first decade of the 20th century, the United Kingdom was allied with France (by the Entente Cordiale) and Russia (which had a secret agreement with France for mutual support in a war against the Prussian-led German Empire and the Austro-Hungarian Empire).

When the First World War broke out in August 1914 the British Army sent the British Expeditionary Force (BEF), consisting mainly of regular army troops, to France and Belgium. The fighting bogged down into static trench warfare for the remainder of the war. In 1915 the army created the Mediterranean Expeditionary Force to invade the Ottoman Empire via Gallipoli, an unsuccessful attempt to capture Constantinople and secure a sea route to Russia.

The First World War was the most devastating in British military history, with nearly 800,000 men killed and over two million wounded. Early in the war, the BEF was virtually destroyed and was replaced first by volunteers and then by a conscript force. Major battles included those at the Somme and Passchendaele. Advances in technology saw the advent of the tank (and the creation of the Royal Tank Regiment) and advances in aircraft design (and the creation of the Royal Flying Corps) which would be decisive in future battles. Trench warfare dominated Western Front strategy for most of the war, and the use of chemical weapons (disabling and poison gases) added to the devastation.

The Second World War broke out in September 1939 with the German Army's invasion of Poland. British assurances to the Poles led the British Empire to declare war on Germany. As in the First World War, a relatively small BEF was sent to France but then hastily evacuated from Dunkirk as the German forces swept through the Low Countries and across France in May 1940.

After the British Army recovered from its earlier defeats, it defeated the Germans and Italians at the Second Battle of El Alamein in North Africa in 1942–1943 and helped drive them from Africa. It then fought through Italy and, with the participation of American, Canadian, Australian, New Zealand, Indian and Free French forces, was one of the principal organisers alongside the U.S. Army and participant in the D-Day invasion of Normandy on 6 June 1944; nearly half the Allied soldiers were British. In the Far East, the British Army rallied against the Japanese in the Burma Campaign and regained the British Far Eastern colonial possessions.

=== Postcolonial era (1945–2000) ===
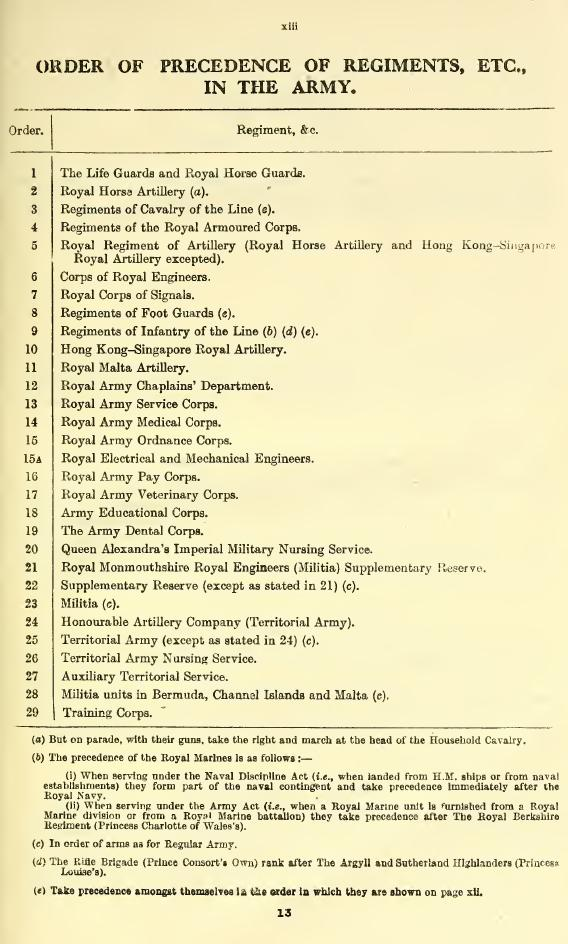
1945 Order of Precedence of the British Army

After the Second World War the British Army was significantly reduced in size, although National Service continued until 1960. This period saw decolonisation begin with the partition and independence of India and Pakistan, followed by the independence of British colonies in Africa and Asia.

The Corps Warrant, which is the official list of which bodies of the British Military (not to be confused with naval) Forces were to be considered Corps of the British Army for the purposes of the Army Act, the Reserve Forces Act, 1882, and the Territorial and Reserve Forces Act, 1907, had not been updated since 1926 (Army Order 49 of 1926), although amendments had been made up to and including Army Order 67 of 1950. A new Corps Warrant was declared in 1951.

Although the British Army was a major participant in Korea in the early 1950s and Suez in 1956, during this period Britain's role in world events was reduced and the army was downsized. The British Army of the Rhine, consisting of I (BR) Corps, remained in Germany as a bulwark against Soviet invasion. The Cold War continued, with significant technological advances in warfare, and the army saw the introduction of new weapons systems. Despite the decline of the British Empire, the army was engaged in Aden, Indonesia, Cyprus, Kenya and Malaya. In 1982, the British Army and the Royal Marines helped liberate the Falkland Islands during the conflict with Argentina after that country's invasion of the British territory.

In the three decades following 1969, the army was heavily deployed in Northern Ireland's Operation Banner to support the Royal Ulster Constabulary (later the Police Service of Northern Ireland) in their conflict with republican paramilitary groups. The locally recruited Ulster Defence Regiment was formed, becoming home-service battalions of the Royal Irish Regiment in 1992 before it was disbanded in 2006. Over 700 soldiers were killed during the Troubles. Following the 1994–1996 IRA ceasefires and since 1997, demilitarisation has been part of the peace process and the military presence has been reduced. On 25 June 2007 the 2nd Battalion of the Princess of Wales's Royal Regiment left the army complex in Bessbrook, County Armagh, ending the longest operation in British Army history.

==== Persian Gulf War ====
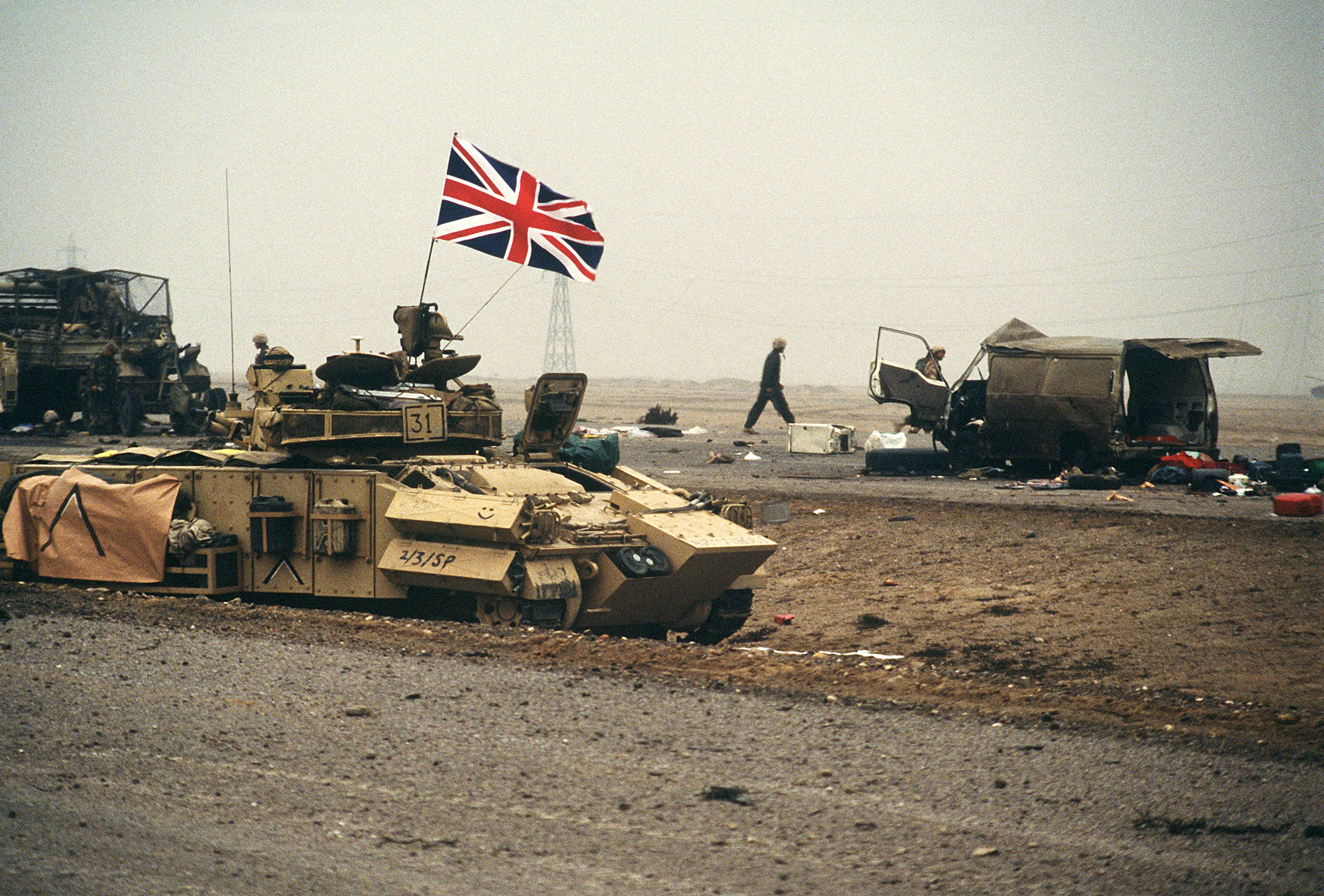
British APC passing by wrecked and abandoned vehicles along the "Highway of Death" in 1991.

The British Army contributed 50,000 troops to the coalition which fought Iraq in the Persian Gulf War, and British forces controlled Kuwait after its liberation. Forty-seven British military personnel died during the war.

==== Balkan conflicts ====
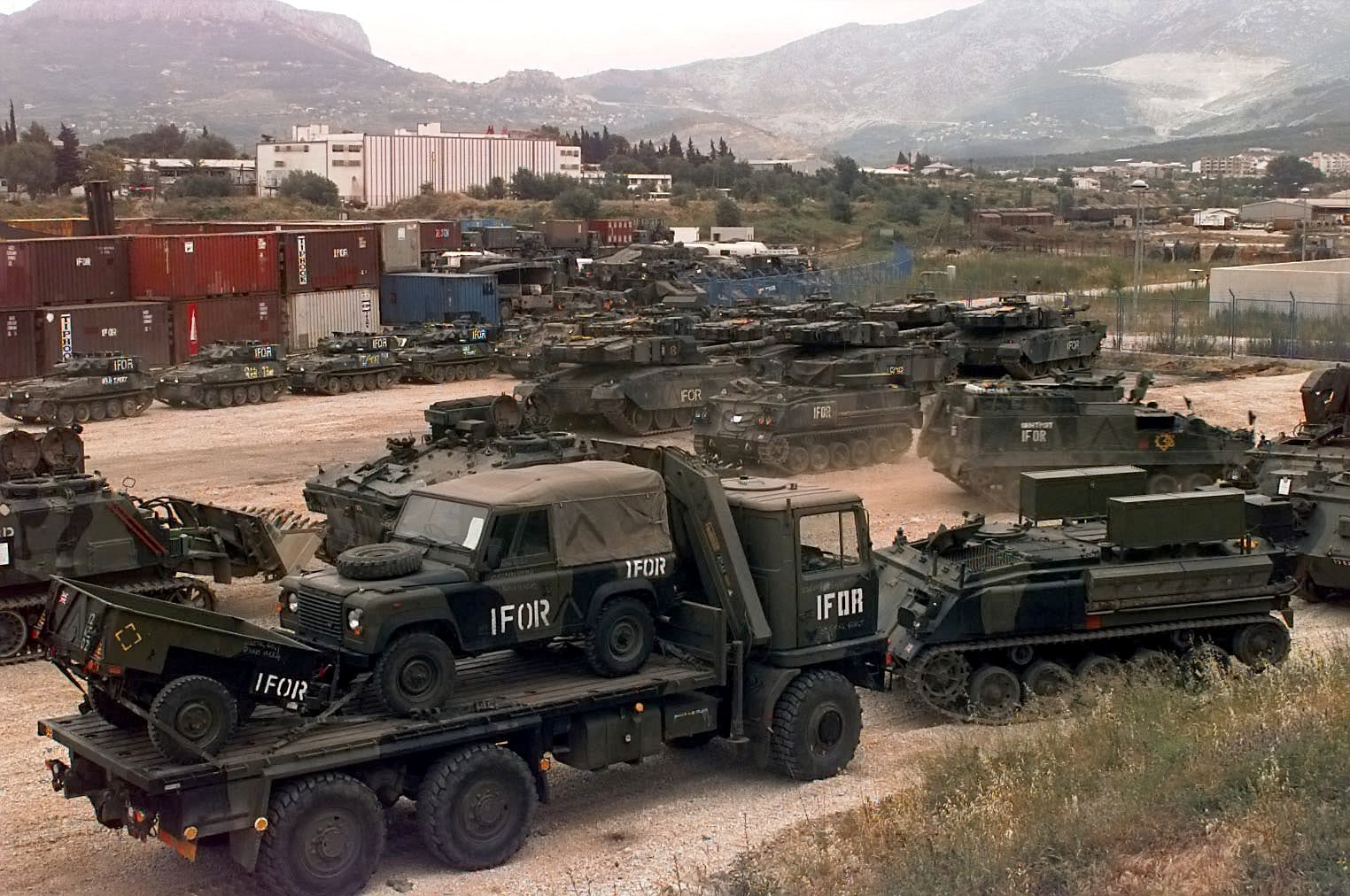
British Army vehicles in a staging area before being deployed to Bosnia

The army was deployed to former Yugoslavia in 1992. Initially part of the United Nations Protection Force, in 1995 its command was transferred to the Implementation Force (IFOR) and then to the Stabilisation Force in Bosnia and Herzegovina (SFOR); the commitment rose to over 10,000 troops. In 1999, British forces under SFOR command were sent to Kosovo and the contingent increased to 19,000 troops. Between early 1993 and June 2010, 72 British military personnel died during operations in the former Yugoslavian countries of Bosnia, Kosovo and Macedonia.

==== The Troubles ====
Although there have been permanent garrisons in Northern Ireland throughout its history, the British Army was deployed as a peacekeeping force from 1969 to 2007 in Operation Banner. Initially, this was (in the wake of unionist attacks on nationalist communities in Derry and Belfast) to prevent further loyalist attacks on Catholic communities; it developed into support of the Royal Ulster Constabulary (RUC) and its successor, the Police Service of Northern Ireland (PSNI) against the Provisional Irish Republican Army (PIRA). Under the 1998 Good Friday Agreement, there was a gradual reduction in the number of soldiers deployed. In 2005, after the PIRA declared a ceasefire, the British Army dismantled posts, withdrew many troops and restored troop levels to those of a peacetime garrison.

Operation Banner ended at midnight on 31 July 2007 after about 38 years of continuous deployment, the longest in British Army history. According to an internal document released in 2007, the British Army had failed to defeat the IRA but made it impossible for them to win by violence. Operation Helvetic replaced Operation Banner in 2007, maintaining fewer service personnel in a more-benign environment. Of the 300,000 troops who served in Northern Ireland since 1969, there were 763 British military personnel killed and 306 killed by the British military, mostly civilians. An estimated 100 soldiers committed suicide during Operation Banner or soon afterwards and a similar number died in accidents. A total of 6,116 were wounded.

Sierra Leone

The British Army deployed to Sierra Leone for Operation Palliser in 1999, under United Nations resolutions, to aid the government in quelling violent uprisings by militiamen. British troops also provided support during the 2014 West African Ebola virus epidemic.

=== Recent history (2000–present) ===
==== War in Afghanistan ====
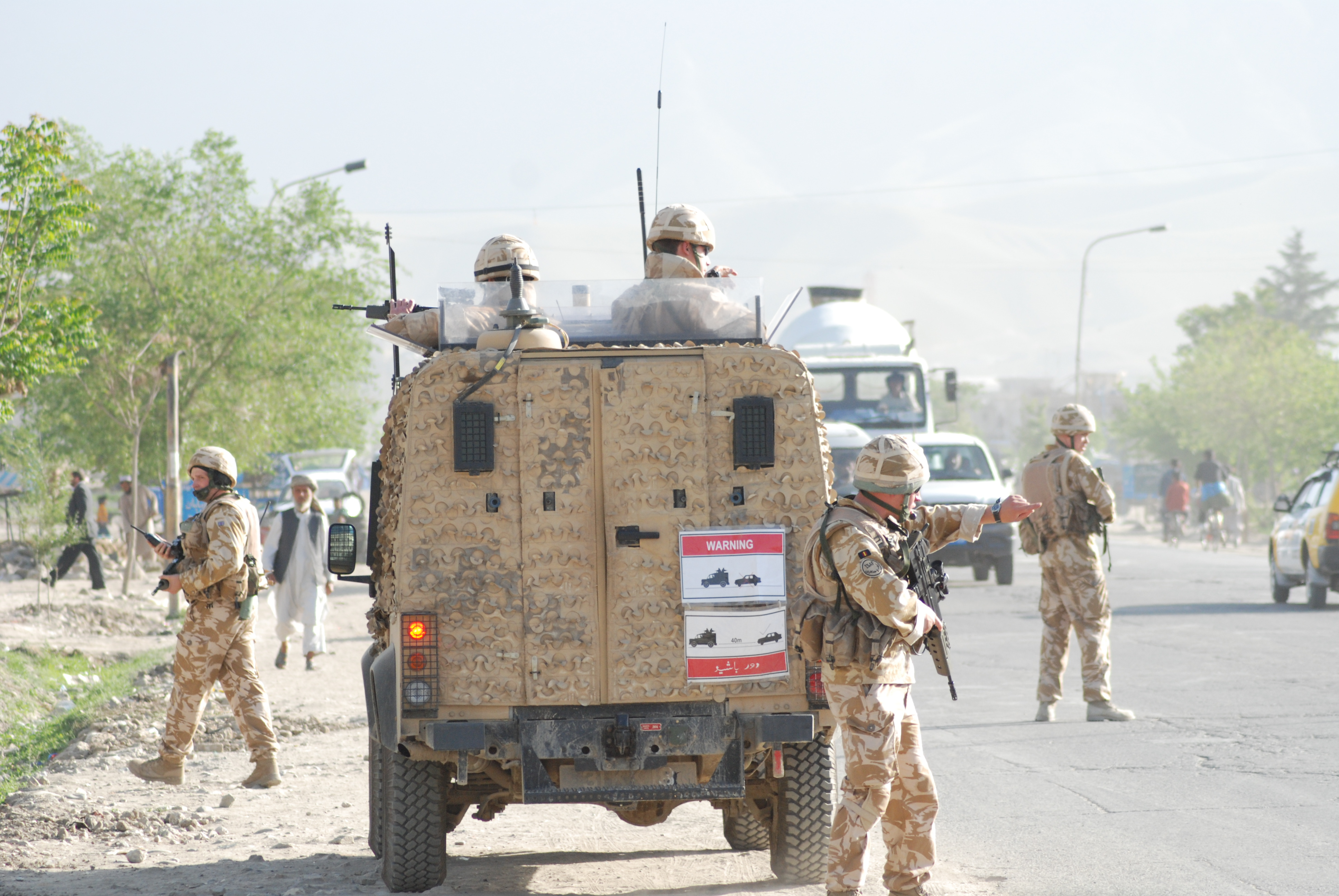
Royal Anglian Regiment in Helmand Province

In November 2001, as part of Operation Enduring Freedom with the United States, the United Kingdom deployed forces in Afghanistan to topple the Taliban in Operation Herrick. The 3rd Division were sent to Kabul to assist in the liberation of the capital and defeat Taliban forces in the mountains. In 2006 the British Army began concentrating on fighting Taliban forces and bringing security to Helmand Province, with about 9,500 British troops (including marines, airmen and sailors) deployed at its peak—the second-largest force after that of the US. In December 2012 Prime Minister David Cameron announced that the combat mission would end in 2014, and troop numbers gradually fell as the Afghan National Army took over the brunt of the fighting. Between 2001 and 26 April 2014 a total of 453 British military personnel died in Afghan operations. Operation Herrick ended with the handover of Camp Bastion on 26 October 2014, but the British Army maintained a deployment in Afghanistan as part of Operation Toral.

Following an announcement by the US Government of the end of their operations in the Afghanistan, the Ministry of Defence announced in April 2021 that British forces would withdraw from the country by 11 September 2021. It was later reported that all UK troops would be out by early July. Following the collapse of the Afghan Army, and the completion of the withdrawal of civilians, all British troops had left by the end of August 2021.

==== Iraq War ====
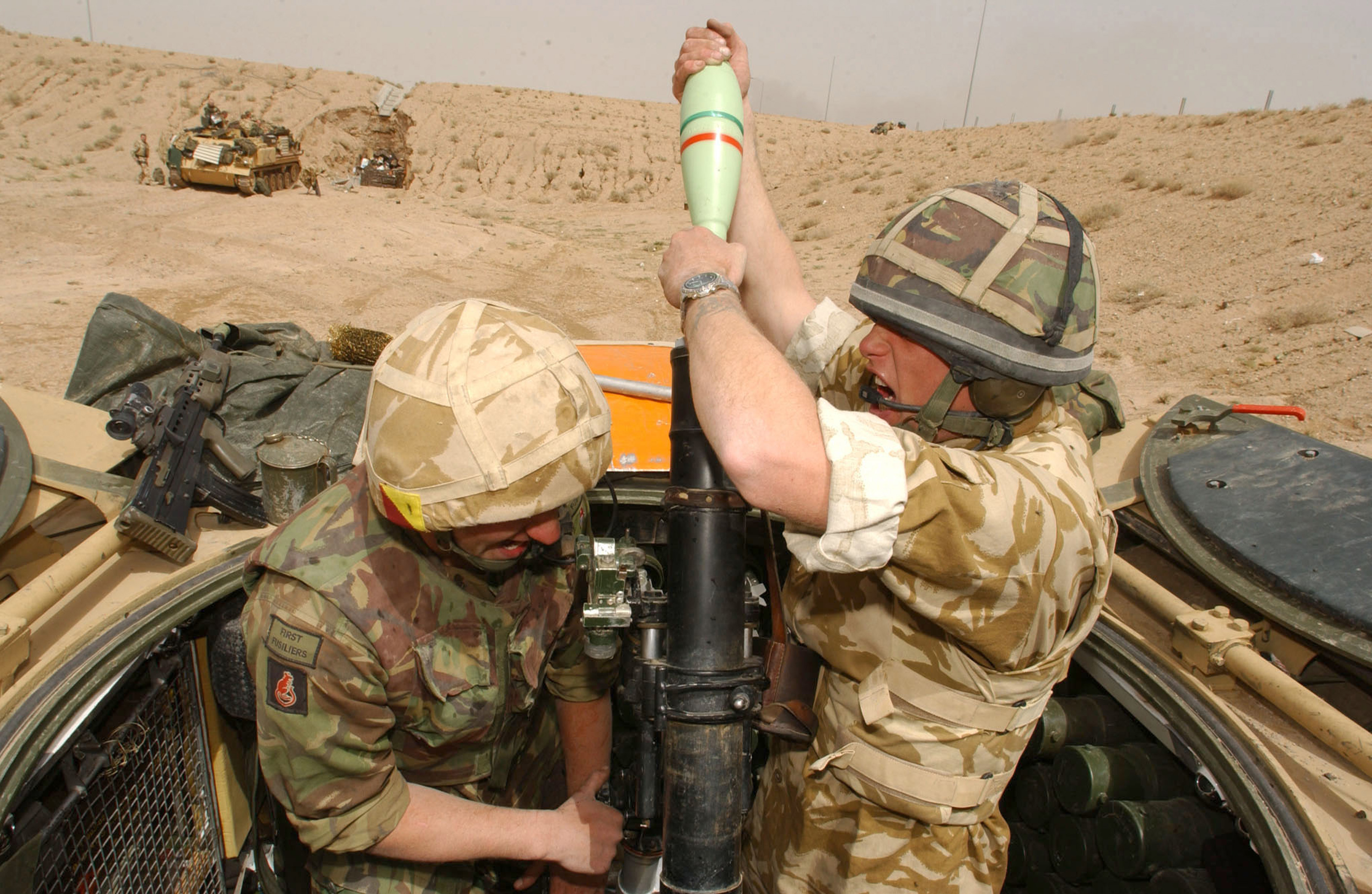
British soldiers from the 1st Battalion, Royal Regiment of Fusiliers battlegroup engage Iraqi positions with an 81mm mortar south of Basra

In 2003, the United Kingdom was a major contributor to the invasion of Iraq, sending a force of over 46,000 military personnel. The British Army controlled southern Iraq, and maintained a peace-keeping presence in Basra. All British troops were withdrawn from Iraq by 30 April 2009, after the Iraqi government refused to extend their mandate. One hundred and seventy-nine British military personnel died in Iraqi operations. The British Armed Forces returned to Iraq in 2014 as part of Operation Shader to counter the Islamic State (ISIL).

==== Recent military aid ====
The British Army maintains a standing liability to support the civil authorities in certain circumstances, usually in either niche capabilities (e.g. explosive ordnance removal) or in general support of the civil authorities when their capacity is exceeded. In recent years this has been seen as army personnel supporting the civil authorities in the face of the 2001 United Kingdom foot-and-mouth outbreak, the 2002 firefighters strike, widespread flooding in 2005, 2007, 2009, 2013 and 2014, Operation Temperer following the Manchester Arena bombing in 2017 and, most recently, Operation Rescript during the COVID-19 pandemic.

==== Baltic states ====
Since 2016, the British Army has maintained a presence in the Baltic states in support of the NATO Enhanced Forward Presence strategy which responded to the 2014 Russian annexation of Crimea. The British Army leads a multinational armoured battlegroup in Estonia under Operation Cabrit and contributes troops to another military battle group in Poland. As part of the NATO plans, Britain has committed a full mechanized infantry brigade to be on a high state of readiness to defend Estonia.

==== Ukraine ====
Between 2015 and 2022, the British Army deployed Short Term Training Teams (STTTs) to Ukraine under Operation Orbital to help train the Armed Forces of Ukraine against further Russian aggression. This operation was succeeded by Operation Interflex in July 2022.

== Modern army ==
=== Personnel ===
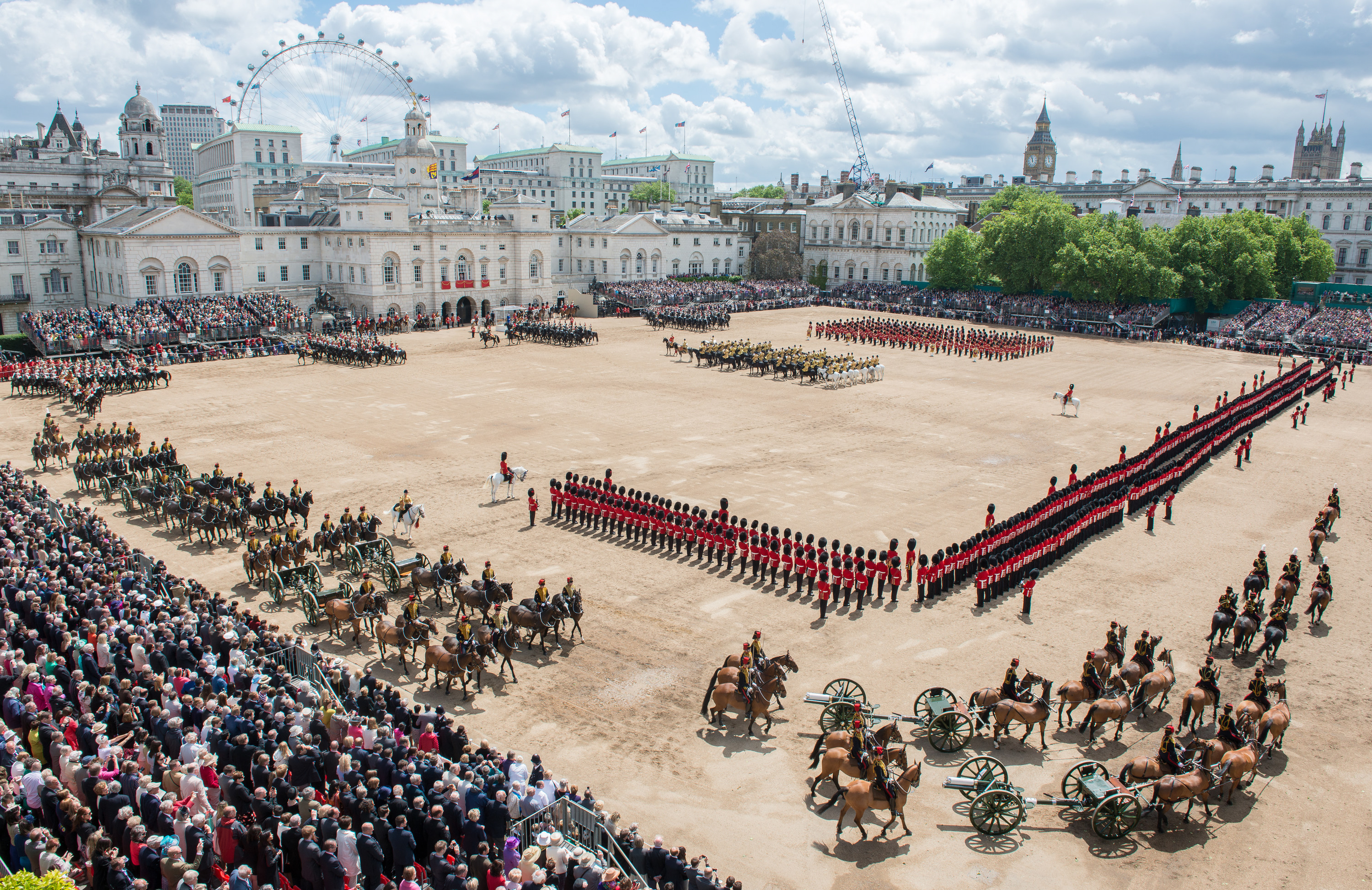
The Blues and Royals Trooping the Colour in 2013

The British Army has been a volunteer force since national service ended during the 1960s. Since the creation of the part-time, reserve Territorial Force in 1908 (renamed the Territorial Army in 1921 and the Army Reserve in 2014), the full-time British Army has been known as the Regular Army. In July 2020 there were just over 78,800 Regulars, with a target strength of 82,000, and just over 30,000 Army Reservists, with a target strength of 30,000. All former Regular Army personnel may also be recalled to duty in exceptional circumstances during the 6-year period following completion of their Regular service, which creates an additional force known as the Regular Reserve.

As of January 2025, the British Army had 73,847 regular soldiers, 4,127 Gurkhas, and 25,742 volunteer reserve personnel. Under the recommendations of the 2025 Strategic Defence Review, the number of regular soldiers is planned to stop declining and eventually increase to 76,000.

The table below illustrates British Army personnel figures from 1710 to 2025.

British Army strength (Note: 1710–1900, 1918 & 1945, 1920, 1930, 1950, 1960, 1970, 1980–2000, 2010, 2015, 2020)
| 1707–1810 | | 1810–1921 | | 1930–Present | | | |
| Year | Regular Army | Year | Regular Army | Year | Regular Army | Army Reserve | Total |
| 1710 | 68,000 | 1820 | 93,000 | 1930 | 188,000 | | — |
| 1720 | 20,000 | 1830 | 89,000 | 1945 | 2,930,000 | Included in Regular | 3,120,000 |
| 1730 | 17,000 | 1838 | 89,000 | 1950 | 364,000 | 83,000 | 447,000 |
| 1740 | 46,000 | 1840 | 94,000 | 1960 | 258,000 | 120,000 | 387,000 |
| 1750 | 79,000 | 1850 | 99,000 | 1970 | 174,000 | 80,000 | 256,000 |
| 1760 | 65,000 | 1860 | 236,000 | 1980 | 159,000 | 63,000 | 222,000 |
| 1770 | 24,000 | 1870 | 185,000 | 1990 | 153,000 | 73,000 | 226,000 |
| 1780 | 35,000 | 1880 | 165,000 | 2000 | 110,000 | 45,000 | 155,000 |
| 1790 | 53,000 | 1890 | 210,000 | 2010 | 109,000 | 29,000 | 142,000 |
| 1800 | 200,000 | 1900 | 302,000 | 2020 | 79,000 | 30,000 | 116,000 |
| 1810 | 281,000 | 1918 | 3,838,000 | 2025 | 74,000 | 26,000 | 108,000 |

== Equipment ==
=== Infantry ===
The British Army's basic weapon is the 5.56 mm L85A2 or L85A3 assault rifle, with some specialist personnel using the L22A2 carbine variant (pilots and some tank crew). The weapon was traditionally equipped with either iron sights or an optical SUSAT, although other optical sights have been subsequently purchased to supplement these. The weapon can be enhanced further utilising the Picatinny rail with attachments such as the L17A2 under-barrel grenade launcher. In 2023, the Army Special Operations Brigade, which includes the Ranger Regiment, began using the L403A1, an AR-pattern rifle also used by the Royal Marines. An initiative to find a replacement for the SA80 family, known as Project Grayburn, was in the concept phase in 2025, and is expected to enter the assessment phase in 2026.

Some soldiers are equipped with the 7.62mm L129A1 sharpshooter rifle, which in 2018 formally replaced the L86A2 Light Support Weapon. Support fire is provided by the L7 general-purpose machine gun (GPMG), and indirect fire is provided by L16 81mm mortars. Sniper rifles include the L118A1 7.62 mm, L115A3 and the AW50F, all manufactured by Accuracy International. The British Army utilises the Glock 17 as its side arm.

Anti tank guided weapons include the Javelin, the medium range anti-tank guided weapon replacement for Milan, with overfly and direct attack modes of operation, and the NLAW. The Next-generation Light Anti-tank Weapon (NLAW) is the first, non-expert, short-range, anti-tank missile that rapidly knocks out any main battle tank in just one shot by striking it from above.

=== Armour ===
The army's main battle tank is the Challenger 2, which is being upgraded to Challenger 3. It is supported by the Warrior tracked armoured vehicle as the primary infantry fighting vehicle, (which will soon be replaced by the Boxer 8x8 armoured fighting vehicle) and the Bulldog armoured personnel carrier. The Ajax armoured fighting vehicle is also being brought into service. Light armoured units often utilise the Supacat "Jackal" MWMIK and Coyote tactical support vehicle for reconnaissance and fire support.

=== Artillery ===
The army has three main artillery systems: the M270 multiple launch rocket system (MLRS), the Archer and the L118 light gun. The MLRS, first used in Operation Granby, has an 85-kilometre (53 mi) standard range, or with the PrSM, up to 500 km. The Archer is a 155 mm self-propelled armoured gun with a 50-kilometre (31 mi) range. The L118 light gun is a 105 mm towed gun, which is typically towed by a Pinzgauer all-terrain vehicle. The army plans to replace the Archer with the RCH 155 in the near future.

To identify artillery targets, the army operates the TAIPAN artillery detection radar and utilises artillery sound ranging. For air defence it uses the new Sky Sabre system, which in 2021 replaced the Rapier. It also deploys the Very Short-Range Air Defence (VSHORAD) Starstreak HVM (high-velocity missile) launched by a single soldier or from a Stormer HVM vehicle-mounted launcher.

=== Protected mobility ===
Where armour is not required or mobility and speed are favoured the British Army utilises protected patrol vehicles, such as the Panther variant of the Iveco LMV, the Foxhound, and variants of the Cougar family (such as the Ridgeback, Husky and Mastiff). For day-to-day utility work the army commonly uses the Land Rover Wolf, which is based on the Land Rover Defender.

=== Engineers, utility and signals ===
Specialist engineering vehicles include bomb-disposal robots such as the T7 Multi-Mission Robotic System and the modern variants of the Armoured Vehicle Royal Engineers, including the Titan bridge-layer, Trojan armoured engineer vehicle, Terrier armoured digger. Day-to-day utility work uses a series of support vehicles, including six-, nine- and fifteen-tonne MAN trucks, Oshkosh heavy-equipment transporters (HET), close-support tankers, quad bikes and ambulances. Tactical communication uses the Bowman radio system, and operational or strategic communication is controlled by the Royal Corps of Signals.

=== Aviation ===
The Army Air Corps (AAC) provides direct aviation support, with the Royal Air Force providing support helicopters. The primary attack helicopter is the Boeing AH-64E Apache which replaced the AgustaWestland Apache AH-1 in the anti-tank, anti-air defence, and anti-armour role. The AgustaWestland AW159 Wildcat is a dedicated intelligence, surveillance, target acquisition, and reconnaissance (ISTAR) helicopter. The Eurocopter AS 365N Dauphin is used for special operations aviation, primarily counter terrorism operations, within the UK. The army operates unmanned aerial vehicles in a surveillance role, such as the small Lockheed Martin Desert Hawk III.

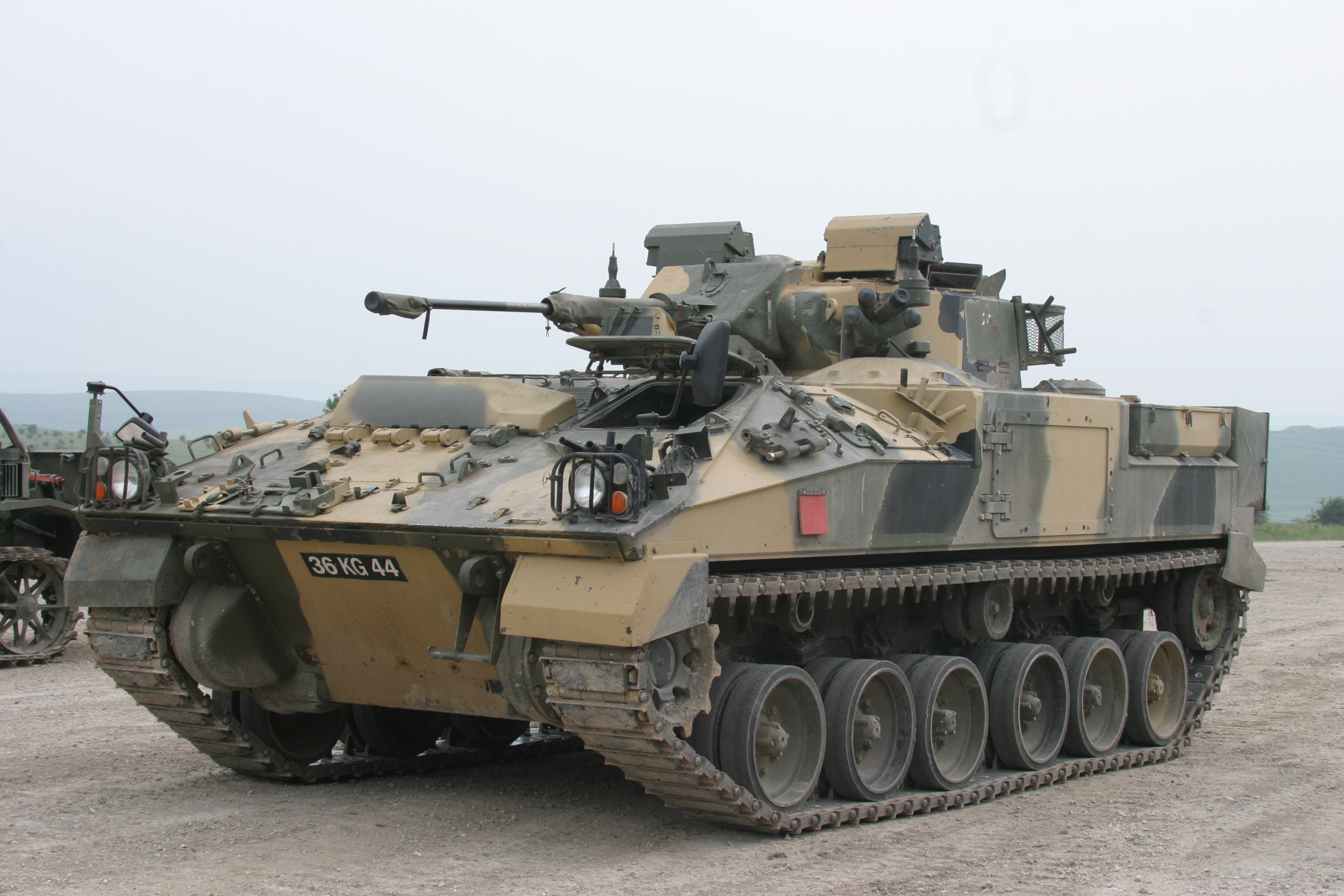
Warrior IFV

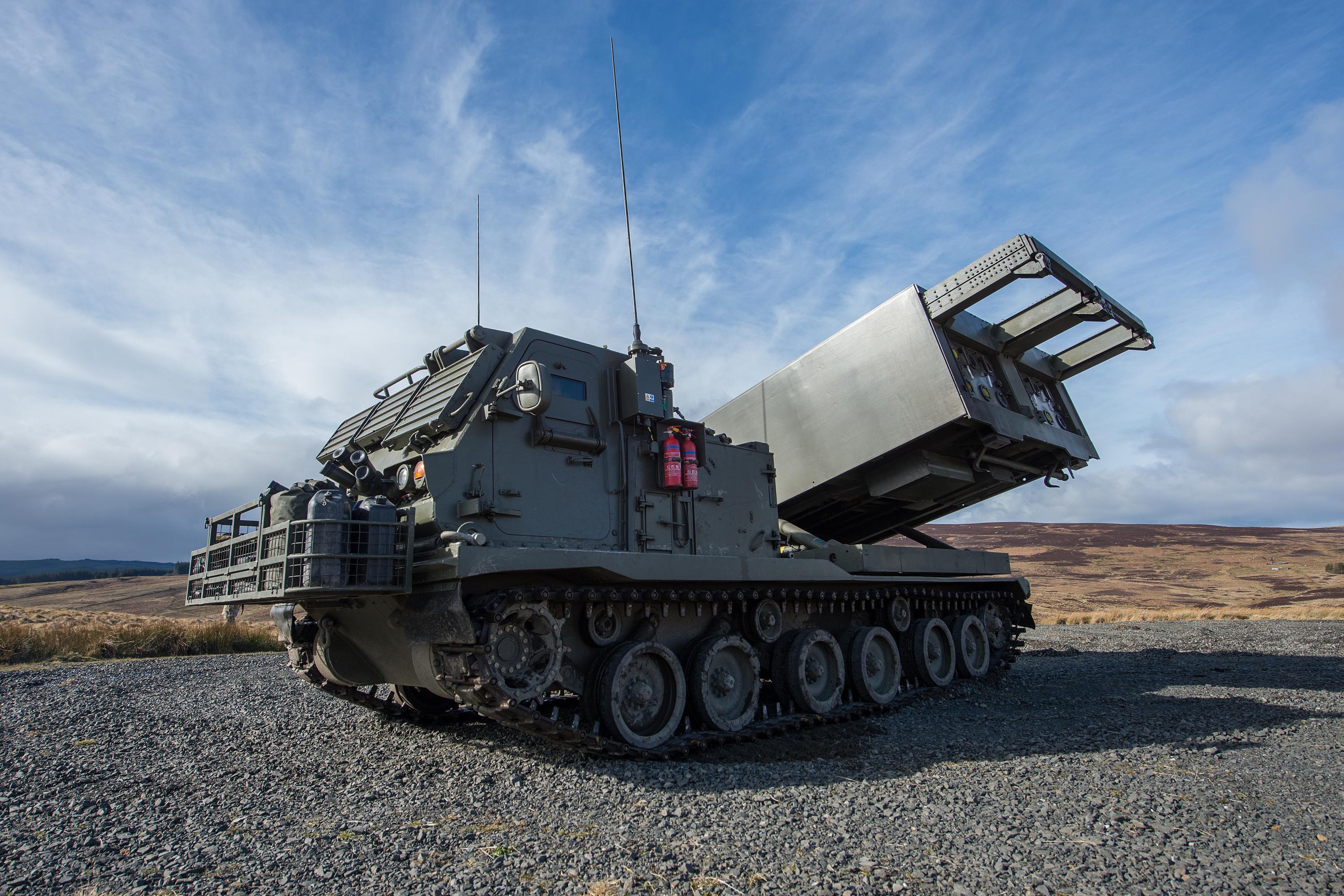
Guided multiple launch rocket system (GMLRS)

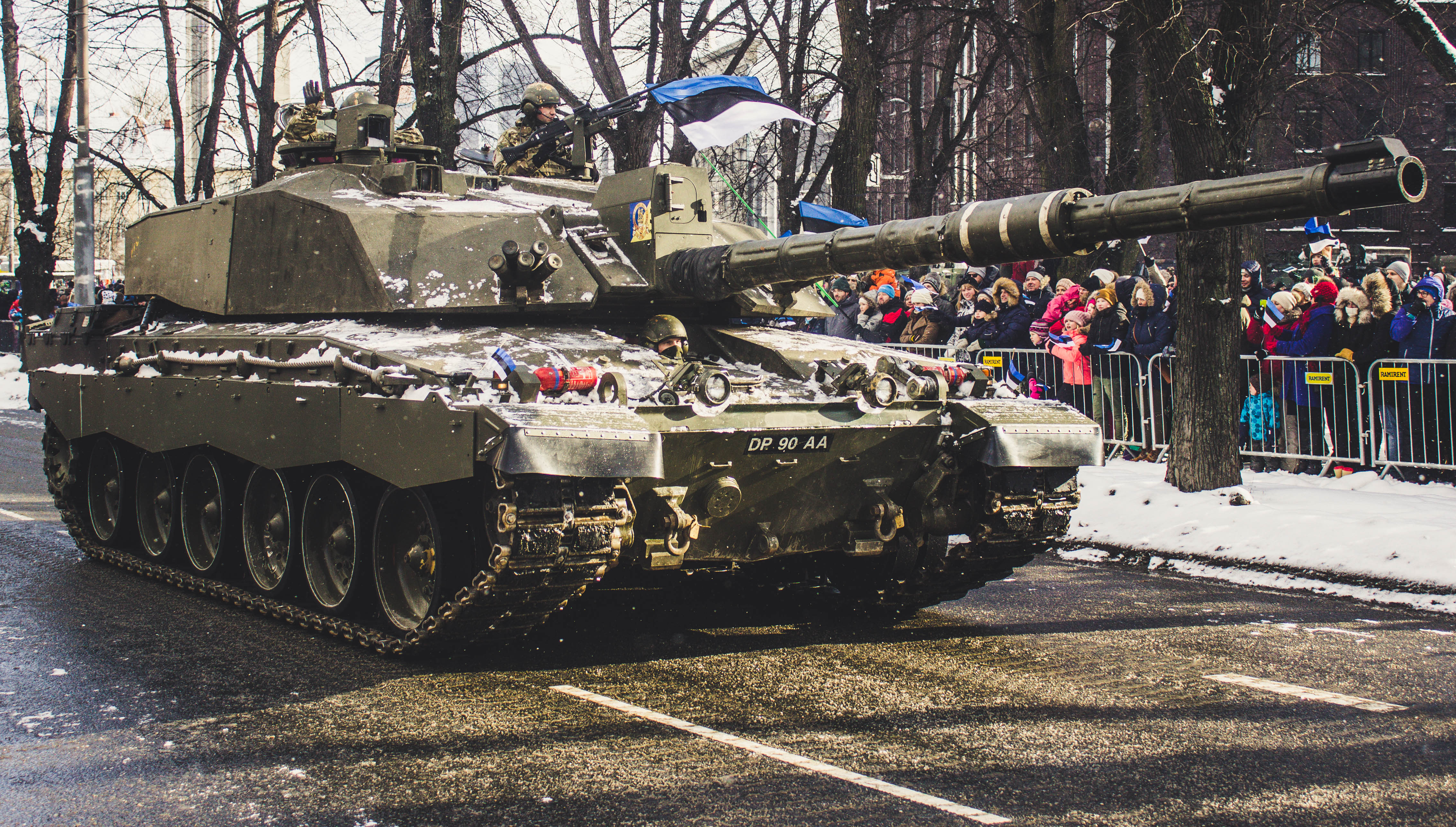
Challenger 2

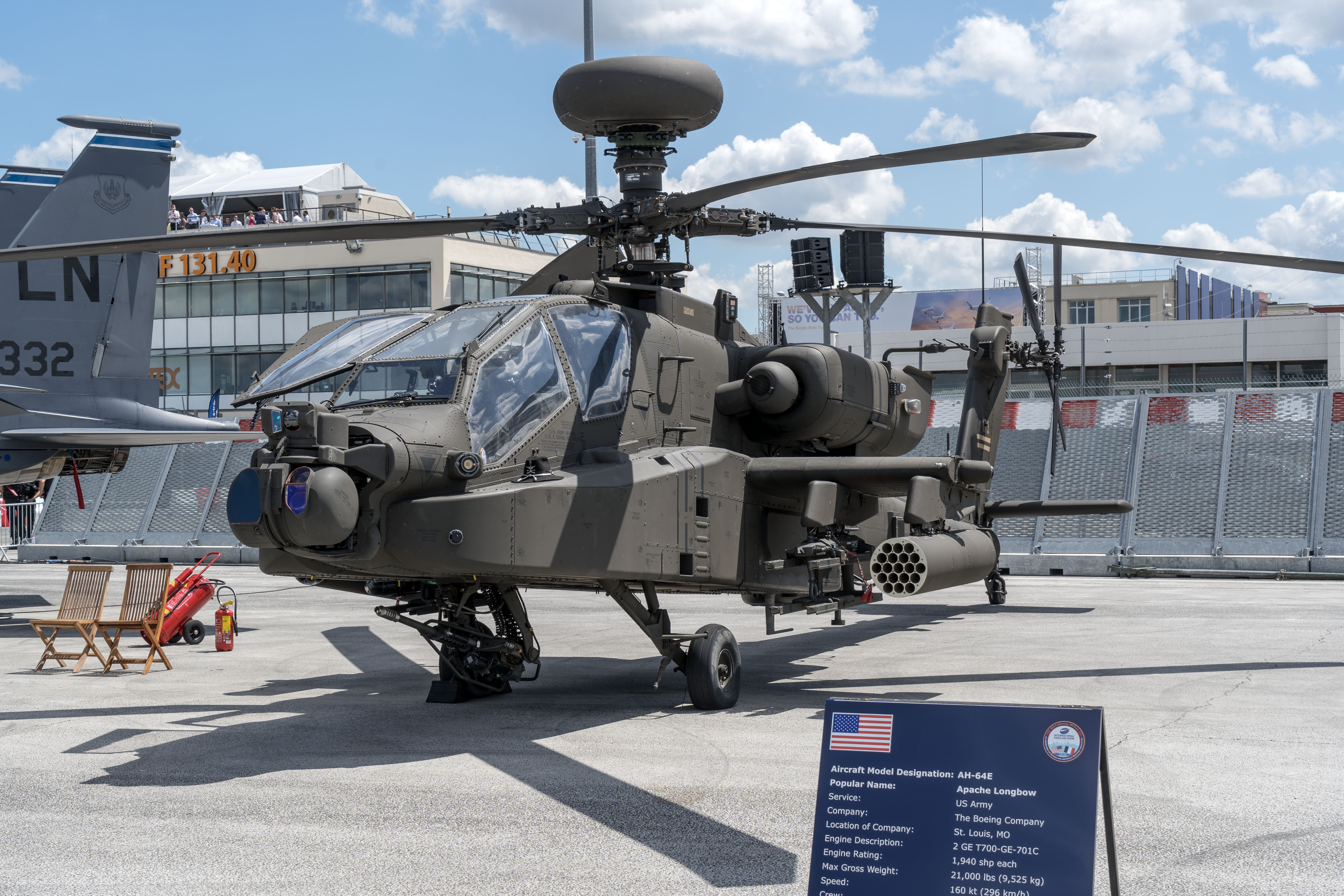
Apache AH64-E

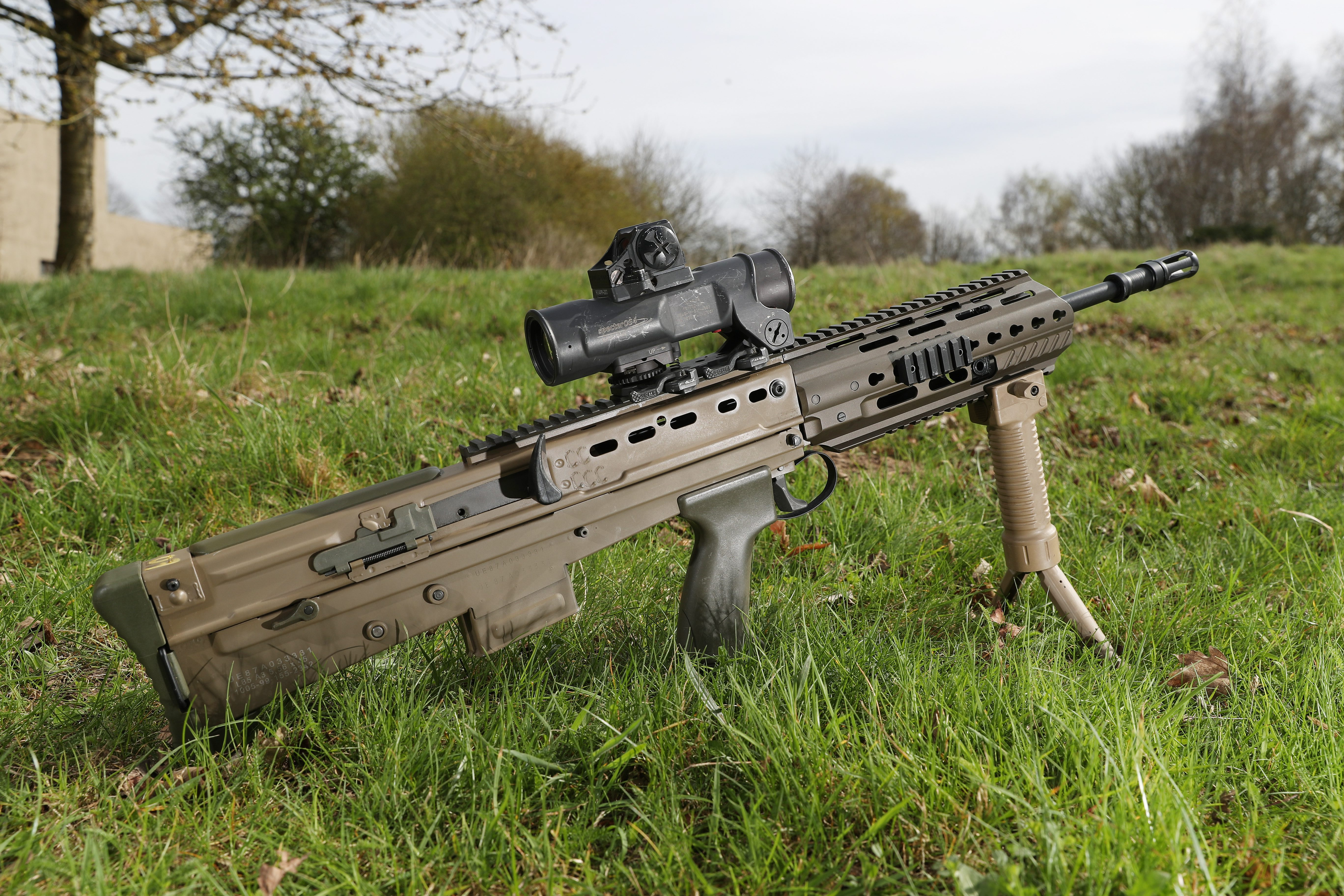
L85A3 (SA80A3)

== Current deployments ==
=== Low-intensity operations ===
| Location | Date | Details |
|---|---|---|
| Iraq | Since 2014 | Operation Shader: The UK has a leading role in the 67-member Global Coalition committed to defeating ISIL. The coalition includes Iraq, European nations and the US. British soldiers are not in a combat role in Iraq but are on the ground with coalition partners providing training and equipment to Iraqi Security Forces (ISF) and Kurdish Security Forces (KSF). There were approximately 400 military personnel in Iraq in 2020. |
| Cyprus | Since 1964 | Operation Tosca: There were 275 troops deployed as part of the UNFICYP in 2016. |
| Estonia | Since 2017 | NATO Enhanced Forward Presence: The British Army deploys approximately 900 troops to Estonia and 150 to Poland as part of its commitment to NATO. |
| Africa | Since 2019 | The British Army maintains several short-term military training teams to help build the capacity of national military forces, ensuring a number of states across Africa can respond appropriately and proportionally to the security threats they face, including terrorism, the illegal wildlife trade, violations of human rights and emerging humanitarian crises. |

=== Permanent overseas postings ===
| Location | Date | Details |
|---|---|---|
| Belize | 1949 | British Army Training and Support Unit Belize: The British Army has maintained a presence in Belize since its independence. Currently the British Army Training Support Unit in Belize enables close country and tropical environment training to troops from the UK and international partners. |
| Bermuda | 1701 | Royal Bermuda Regiment: Colonial Militia and volunteers existed from 1612 to 1816. The regular English Army, then British Army, Bermuda Garrison was first established by an Independent Company in 1701. Volunteers were recruited into the regular army and the Board of Ordnance Military Corps for part-time, local-service from the 1830s to the 1850s due to the lack of a Militia. The British Government considered Bermuda as an Imperial fortress, rather than a colony. After the French Revolution, the governor of Bermuda was normally a military officer (usually a lieutenant-general or major-general of the Royal Artillery or Royal Engineers) in charge of all military forces in Bermuda, with the Bermuda Garrison falling under the Nova Scotia Command. From 1868, the Bermuda Garrison became the independent Bermuda Command, with governors being generals, lieutenant-generals or major generals occupying the role of commander-in-chief or general officer commanding-in-chief (GOC-in-C). Locally recruited reserve units, the Royal Artillery-badged Bermuda Militia Artillery (BMA) and Bermuda Volunteer Rifle Corps (BVRC) were raised again from 1894, later joined by the Royal Engineers-badged Bermuda Volunteer Engineers (1931–1946), General Service Corps-badged Bermuda Militia Infantry (1939–1946), and a Home Guard (1942–1946). After the Royal Naval Dockyard was redesignated a naval base in 1951, the army garrison was closed in 1957, leaving only the part-time BMA (re-tasked as infantry in 1953, though still badged and uniformed as Royal Artillery) and BVRC (renamed Bermuda Rifles in 1949). The Bermuda Command Headquarters and all regular army personnel other than members of the Permanent Staff of the local Territorials and the aide-de-camp to the Governor of Bermuda (today normally a captain from the Royal Bermuda Regiment employed full-time for the duration of the appointment) were withdrawn. Home defence has been provided by the Royal Bermuda Regiment since formed by the 1965 amalgamation of the BMA and Bermuda Rifles. |
| Brunei | 1962 | British Forces Brunei: One battalion of the Royal Gurkha Rifles, British Garrison, Training Team Brunei (TTB). A Gurkha battalion has been maintained in Brunei since the Brunei Revolt in 1962 at the request of Sultan Omar Ali Saifuddin III. Training Team Brunei (TTB) is the Army's jungle-warfare school, and a small number of garrison troops support the battalion. 7 Flight AAC formerly provided helicopter support to the Gurkha battalion and TTB but its role has since been assumed by No. 230 Squadron RAF. |
| Canada | 1972 | British Army Training Unit Suffield: A training centre in Alberta prairie for the use of British Army and Canadian Forces under agreement with the government of Canada. British forces conduct regular, major armoured training exercises every year, with helicopter support provided by 29 (BATUS) Flight AAC. |
| Cyprus | 1960 | 2 resident infantry battalions, Royal Engineers and Joint Service Signals Unit at Ayios Nikolaos as part of British Forces Cyprus. The UK retains two Sovereign Base Areas on Cyprus after the rest of the island's independence, which are forward bases for deployments to the Middle East. Principal facilities are Alexander Barracks at Dhekelia and Salamanca Barracks at Episkopi. |
| Falkland Islands | 1982 | Part of British Forces South Atlantic Islands: After the 1982 conflict, the UK established a garrison on the Falkland Islands, consisting of naval, land and air elements. The British Army contribution consists of an infantry company group, a Royal Artillery Battery and an Engineer Squadron. |
| Gibraltar | 1704 | Part of British Forces Gibraltar: The Army has had a presence in Gibraltar for more than 300 years. The people of Gibraltar took up arms as the Gibraltar Volunteer Corps from 1915 to 1920 and again as the Gibraltar Defence Force shortly before the outbreak of WW2. This force later became the Royal Gibraltar Regiment, which remains as the only formed Army unit in Gibraltar. |
| Kenya | 2010 | British Army Training Unit Kenya: The army has a training centre in Kenya. BATUK is a permanent training support unit based mainly in Nanyuki, 200 km north of Nairobi. BATUK provides demanding training to exercising units preparing to deploy on operations or assume high-readiness tasks. BATUK consists of around 100 permanent staff and reinforcing short tour cohort of another 280 personnel. Under an agreement with the Kenyan Government, up to six infantry battalions per year carry out eight-week exercises in Kenya. There are also Royal Engineer exercises, which carry out civil engineering projects, and medical deployments, which provide primary health care assistance to the civilian community under an agreement with the Kenyan government, which provides training facilities for 3 infantry battalions per year. |
| Oman | 2019 | Omani-British Joint Training Area: A training area for combined arms battlegroup training, jointly maintained with the Royal Army of Oman. |

== Structure ==
Army Headquarters is located in Andover, Hampshire, and is responsible for providing forces at operational readiness for employment by the Permanent Joint Headquarters. The command structure is hierarchical, with overall command residing with the Chief of the General Staff (CGS), who is immediately subordinate to The Chief of Defence Staff, the head of the British Armed Services. The CGS is supported by the Deputy Chief of the General Staff. Army Headquarters is further organised into two subordinate commands, Field Army and Home Command, each commanded by a lieutenant general. These two Commands serve distinct purposes and are divided into a structure of divisions and brigades, which themselves consist of a complex mix of smaller units such as Battalions. British Army units are either full-time 'Regular' units, or part-time Army Reserve units.

=== Allied Rapid Reaction Corps ===
Led by a British Army three-star general, one of NATO's High Readiness (Land) Forces based in Gloucestershire, UK, with the following British units under its command:

- 1st Signal Brigade
- 104th Theatre Sustainment Brigade
- 7th Air Defence Group
- 8th Engineer Brigade

=== Field Army ===
Led by Commander Field Army, the Field Army is responsible for generating and preparing forces for current and contingency operations. The Field Army comprises:

- 1st (United Kingdom) Division
- 3rd (United Kingdom) Division
- Field Army Troops

=== Home Command ===
Home Command is the British Army's supporting command; a generating, recruiting and training force that supports the Field Army and delivers UK resilience. It comprises

- Army Personnel Centre, which deals with personnel issues and liaises with outside agencies.
- Army Personnel Services Group, which supports personnel administration
- Army Recruiting and Initial Training Command, which is responsible for all recruiting and training of Officers and Soldiers.
- London District Command, which is the main headquarters for all British Army units within the M25 corridor of London. It also provides for London's ceremonial events as well as supporting operational deployments overseas.
- Regional Command, which enables the delivery of a secure home front that sustains the Army, notably helping to coordinate the British Army's support to the civil authorities, overseeing the British Army's Welfare Service, and delivering the British Army's civil engagement mission.
- Standing Joint Command, which coordinates defence's contribution to UK resilience operations in support of other government departments.

=== Special Forces ===
SAS cap badge

The British Army contributes two of the three special forces formations to the United Kingdom Special Forces directorate: the Special Air Service (SAS) and Special Reconnaissance Regiment (SRR). The SAS consists of one regular and two reserve regiments. The regular regiment, 22 SAS, has its headquarters at Stirling Lines, Credenhill, Herefordshire. It consists of 5 squadrons (A, B, D, G and Reserve) and a training wing. 22 SAS is supported by 2 reserve regiments, 21 SAS and 23 SAS, which collectively form the Special Air Service (Reserve) (SAS [R]), who in 2020 were transferred back under the command of Director of Special Forces after previously being under the command of the 1st Intelligence, Surveillance and Reconnaissance Brigade. The SRR, formed in 2005, performs close reconnaissance and special surveillance tasks. The Special Forces Support Group, under the operational control of the Director of Special Forces, provides operational manoeuvring support to the United Kingdom Special Forces.

=== Colonial units ===
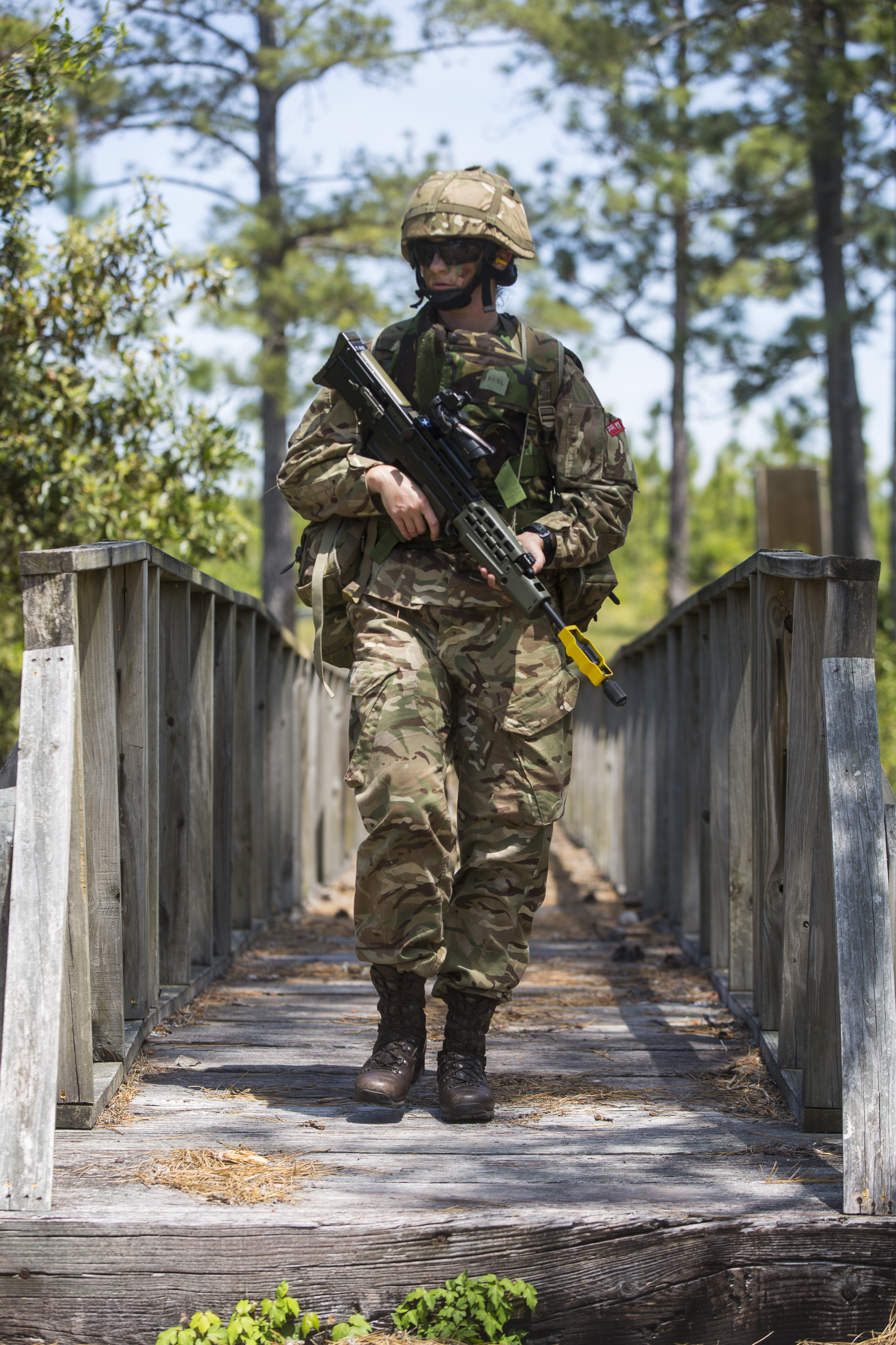
Royal Bermuda Regiment soldier with an L85A2 at USMC Camp Lejeune in 2018

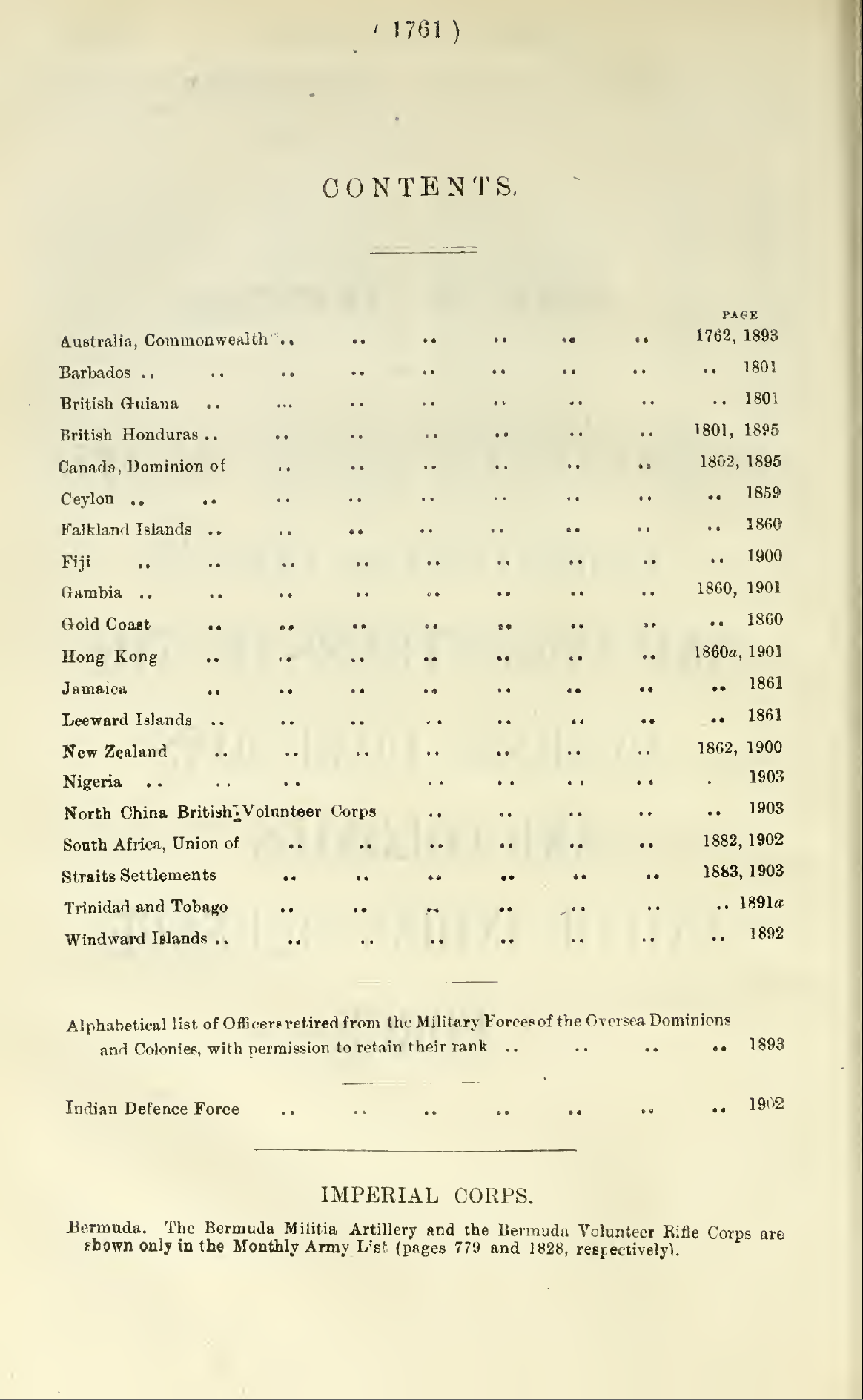
1919 Quarter Four "Army List" Contents page for Oversea Forces

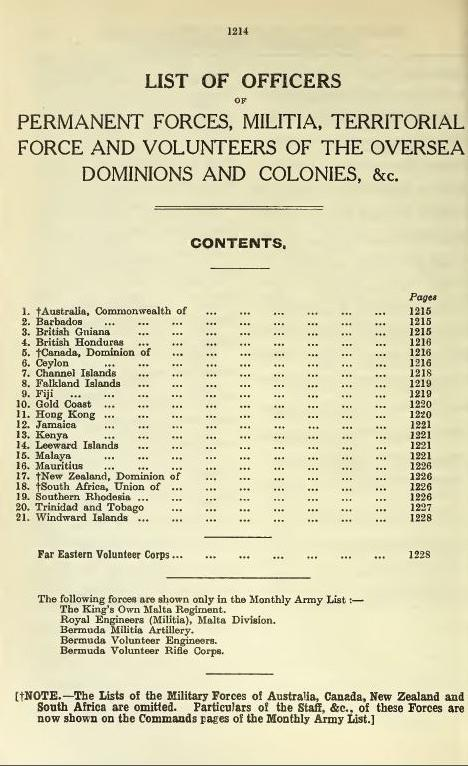
1939 "Army List" Contents page for Dominion and Colonial Regiments

When the English Empire was established in North America (including Bermuda), and the West Indies in the early 17th century there was no standing English Army, only the Militia, Yeomanry, and Royal bodyguards, of which the Militia, as the primary home-defence force, was immediately extended to the colonies. Colonial militias defended colonies single-handedly at first against indigenous peoples and European competitors. Once the standing English Army, later the British Army, came into existence and began to garrison the colonies, the colonial militias fought side by side with it in a number of wars, including the Seven Years' War. Some of the colonial militias rebelled during the American War of Independence. The militia fought alongside the regular British Army (and native allies) in defending British North America from their former countrymen during the War of 1812.

Locally raised units in strategically located Imperial fortress colonies (including: Nova Scotia before the military defence, other than of the dockyard, passed to the new Dominion Government on Canadian Confederation and the Royal Naval Dockyard there was transferred to the Dominion Government in 1905; Bermuda – which was treated as part of The Maritimes under the Commander-in-Chief at Nova Scotia until the Confederation of Canada, with its garrison, formerly commanded by a major-general, becoming the Bermuda Command thereafter, under a general or lieutenant general as general officer commanding-in-chief; Gibraltar; and Malta) and the Channel Islands were generally maintained from army funds and more fully integrated into the British Army as evident from their placements in British Army lists, unlike units such as the King's African Rifles.

The larger colonies (Australia, New Zealand, Canada, South Africa, etc.) mostly achieved Commonwealth Dominion status before or after the First World War and were granted full legislative independence in 1931. While remaining within the British Empire, this placed their governments on a par with the British government, and hence their military units comprised separate armies (e.g. the Australian Army), although Canada retained the term "militia" for its military forces until the Second World War. From the 1940s, these dominions and many colonies chose full independence, usually becoming Commonwealth realms (as member states of the Commonwealth are known today).

Units raised in self-governing and Crown colonies (those without local elected Legislatures, as was the case with British Hong Kong) that are part of the British realm remain under British Government control. As the territorial governments are delegated responsibility only for internal government, the UK Government, as the government of the Sovereign state, retains responsibility for national security and the defence of the fourteen remaining British Overseas Territories, of which six have locally raised regiments:

- Royal Bermuda Regiment
- Royal Gibraltar Regiment
- Falkland Islands Defence Force
- Royal Montserrat Defence Force
- Cayman Islands Regiment
- Turks and Caicos Islands Regiment
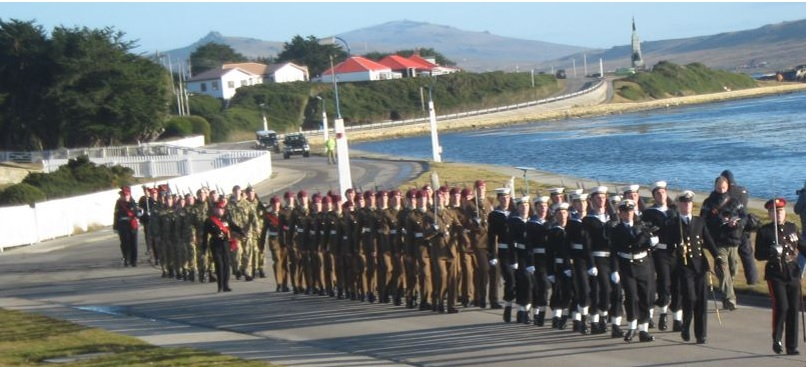
Falkland Islands Defence Force on parade in June 2013

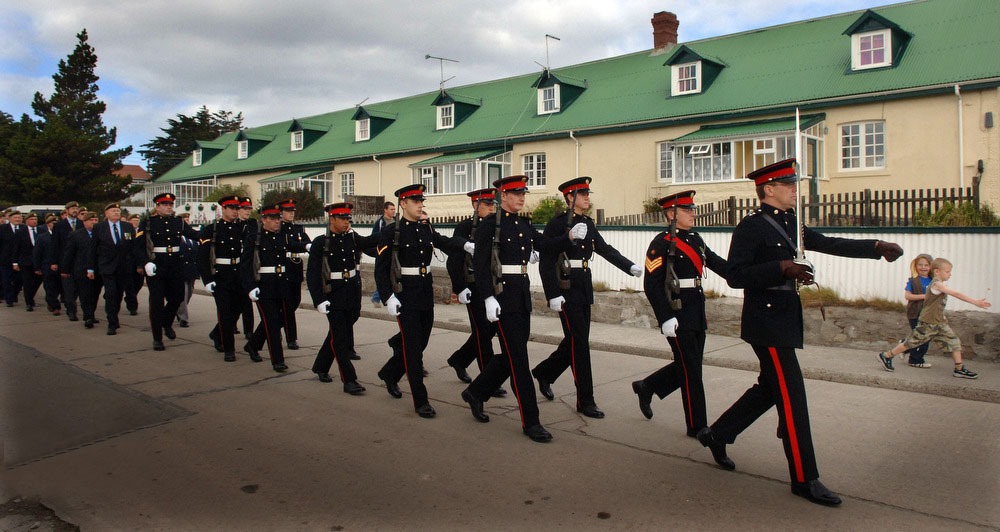
Detachment of the Falkland Islands Defence Force in ceremonial dress

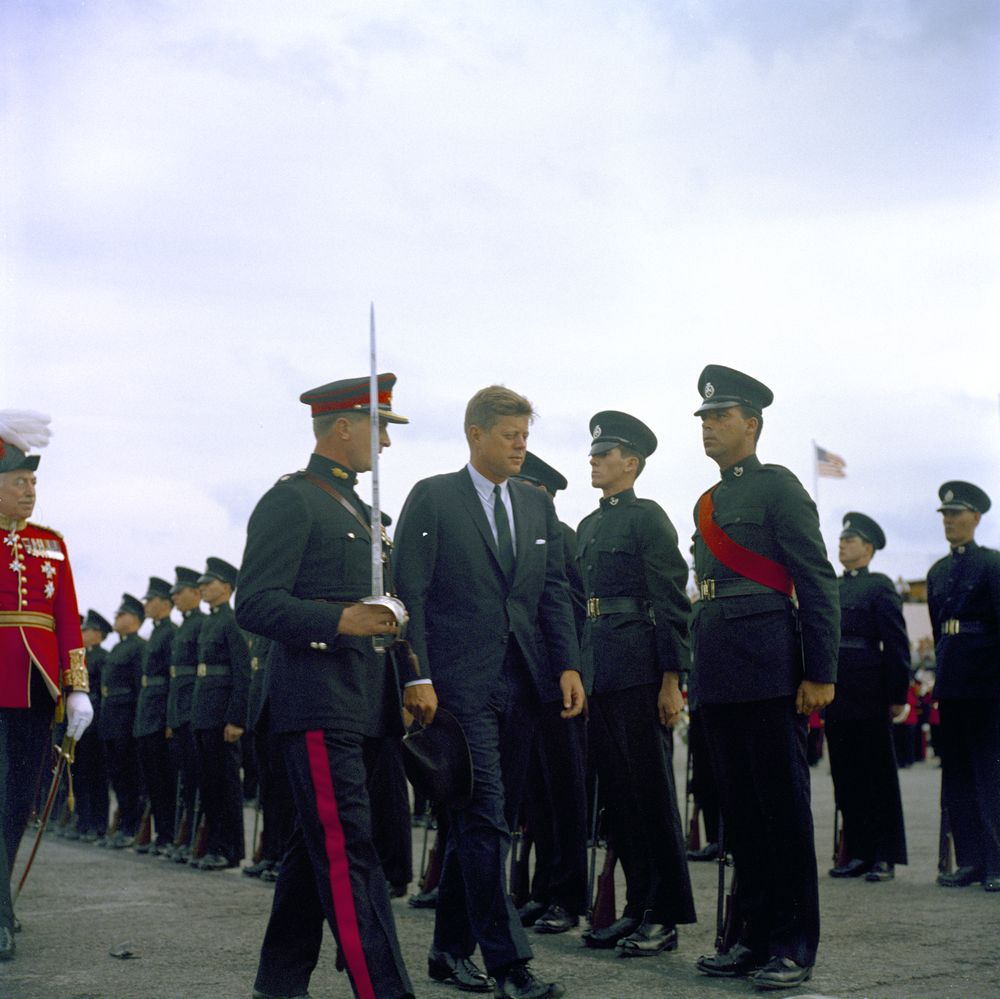
John Fitzgerald Kennedy, escorted by Governor and Commander-in-Chief of Bermuda, Major-general Sir JA Gascoigne, KCMG, KCVO, CB, DSO, DL, and Major JA Marsh, DSO, the officer commanding the Bermuda Militia Artillery, inspects a Bermuda Rifles guard in 1961, four years before the units amalgamated

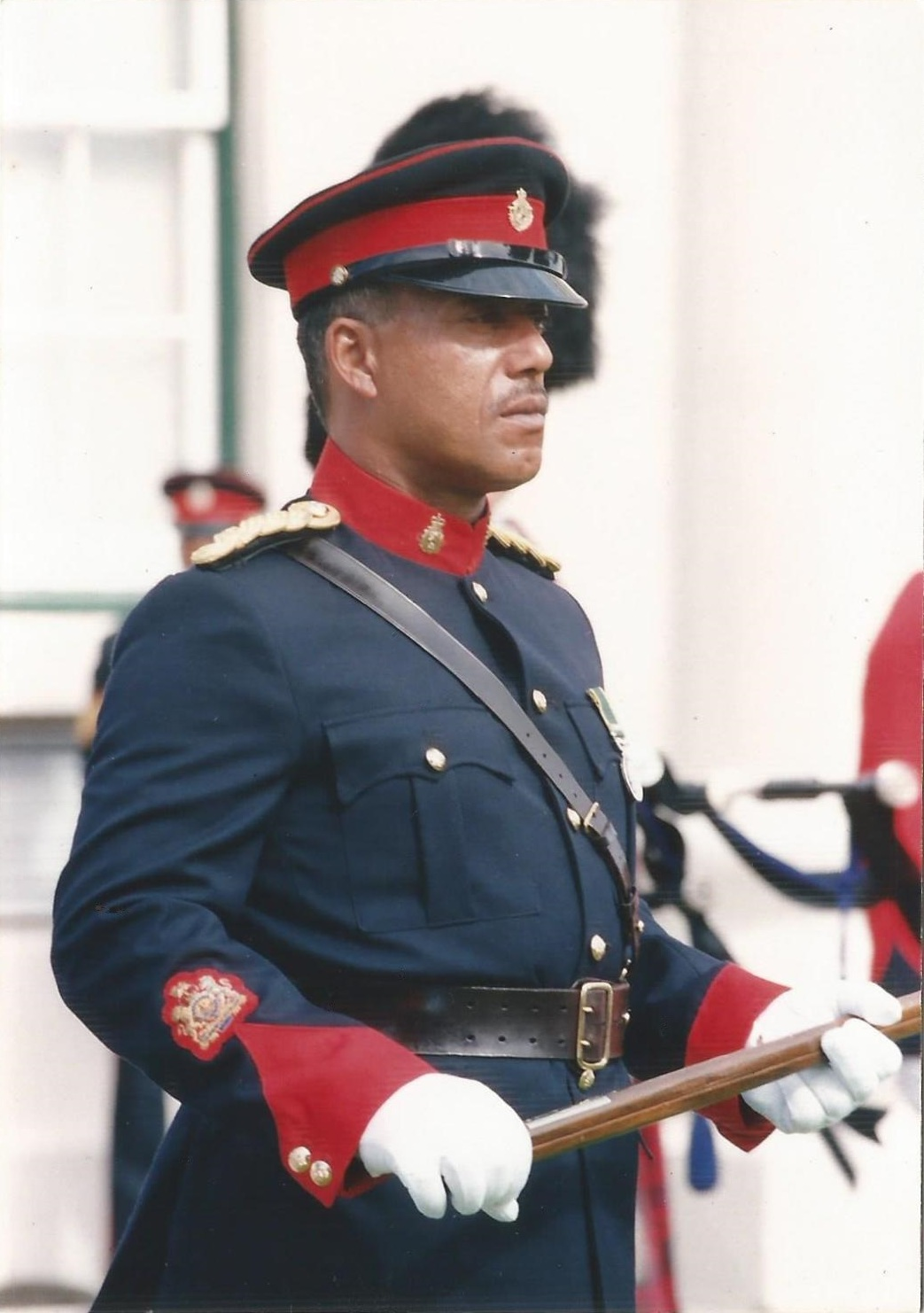
WO1 Herman Eve, RSM of the Royal Bermuda Regiment in 1992

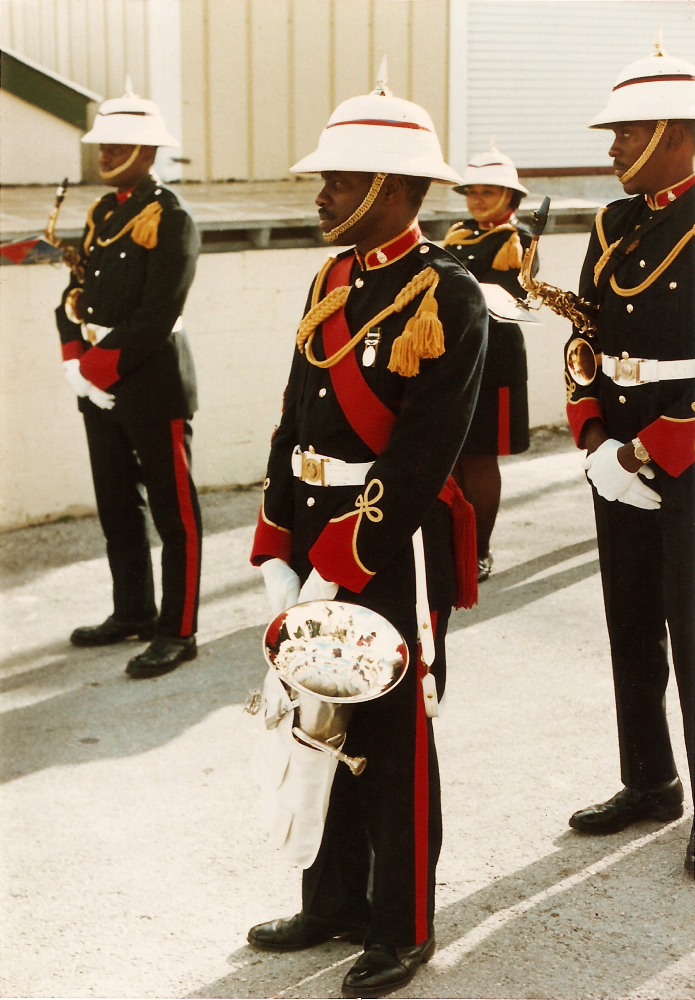
Bandsmen of the Royal Bermuda Regiment

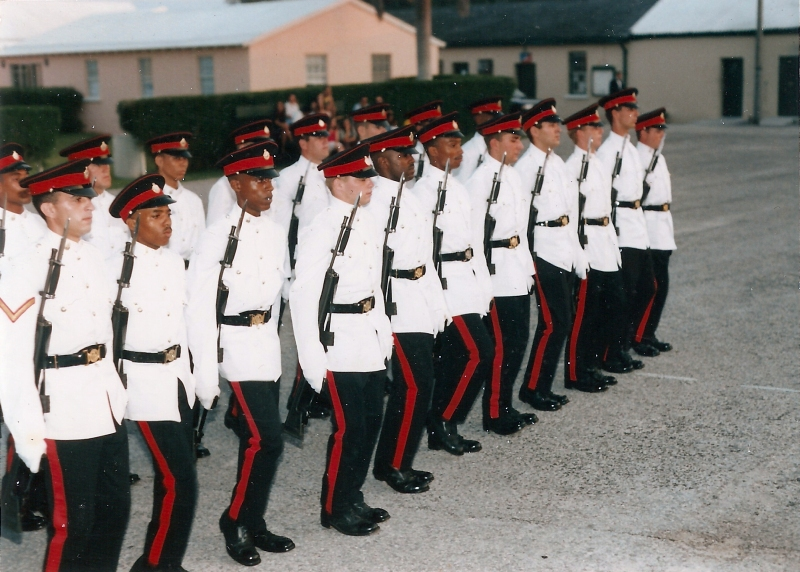
Royal Bermuda Regiment on parade

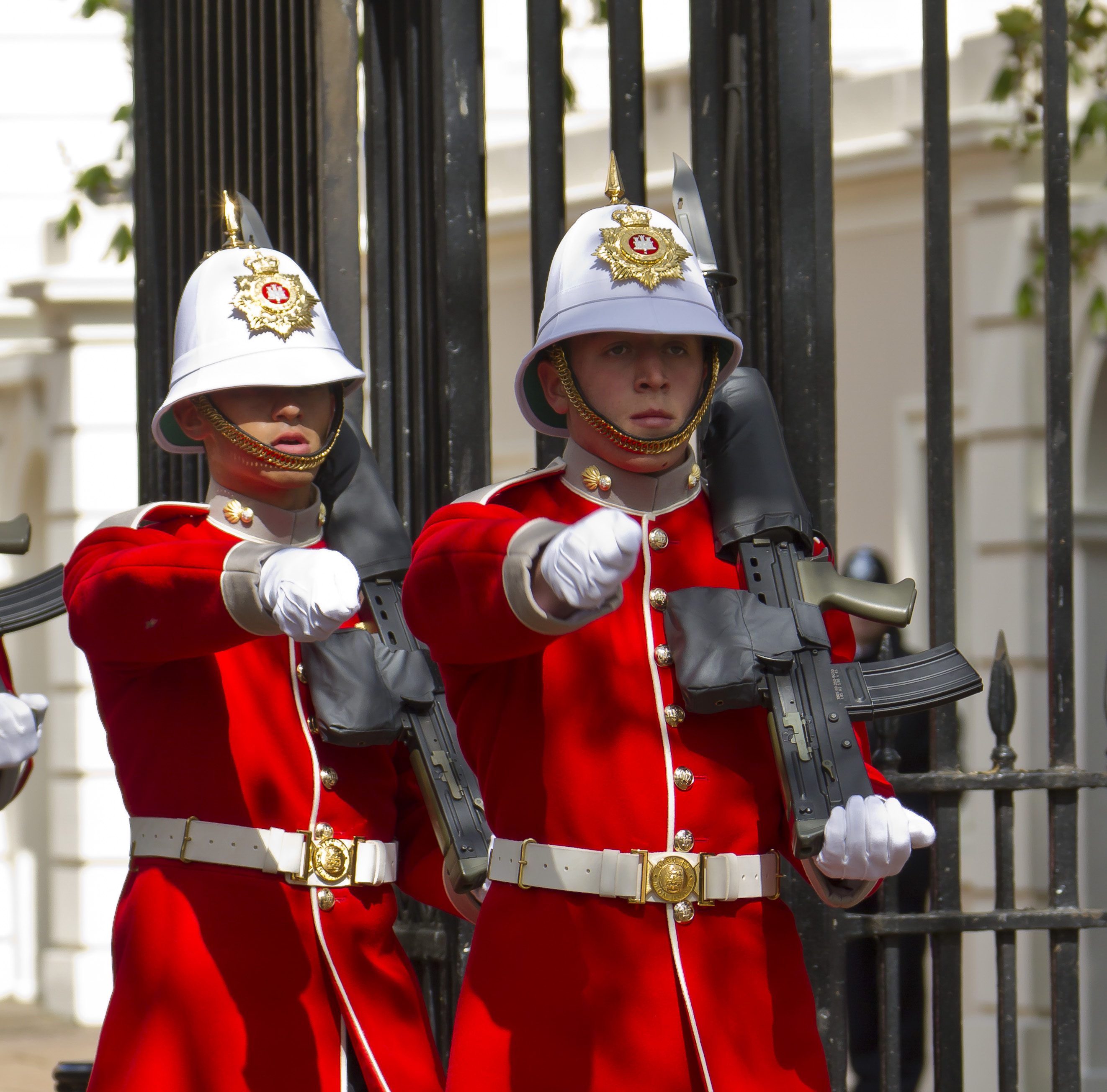
Changing of the guard, Royal Gibraltar Regiment (2012)

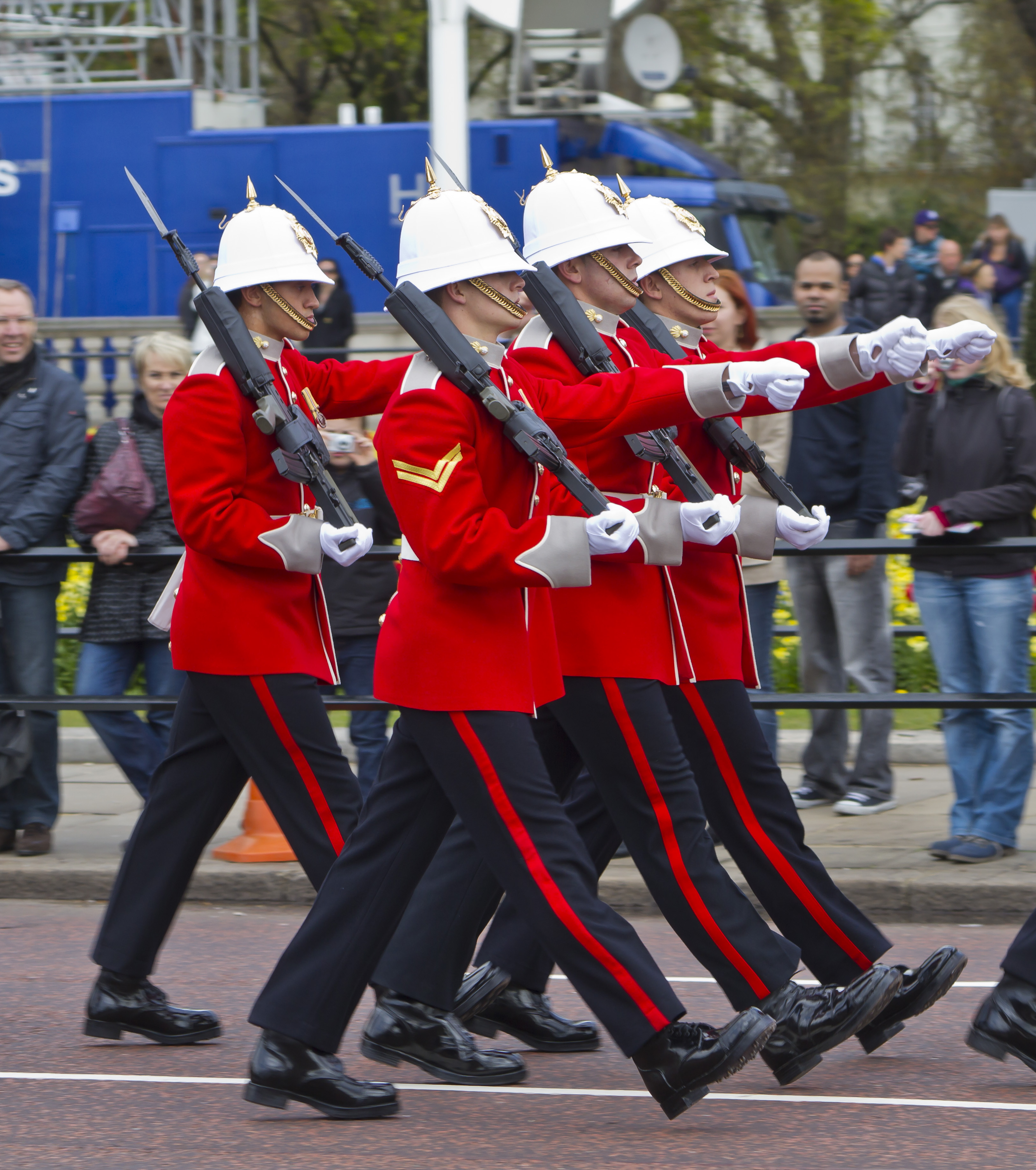
Royal Gibraltar Regiment in London, April 2012

=== Levels of Command ===
The structure of the British Army beneath the level of Divisions and Brigades is also hierarchical and command is based on rank. The table below details how many units within the British Army are structured, although there can be considerable variation between individual units:

| Type of unit | Division | Brigade | Battlegroup | Battalion, Regiment | Company, Squadron, Battery | Platoon or Troop | Section | Fire team |
|---|---|---|---|---|---|---|---|---|
| Contains | 3 brigades | 3–5 battalions (battlegroups) | Combined arms unit | 4–6 companies | 3 platoons | 3 sections | 2 fire teams | 4 individuals |
| Personnel | 10,000 | 5,000 | 700–1,000 | 720 | 120 | 30 | 8–10 | 4 |
| Commanded by | Maj-Gen | Brig | Lt Col | Lt Col | Major | Lt or 2nd Lt | Cpl | LCpl |

Whilst many units are organised as Battalions or Regiments administratively, the most common fighting unit is the combined arms unit known as a Battlegroup. This is formed around a combat unit and supported by units (or sub-units) from other capabilities. An example of a battlegroup would be two companies of armoured infantry (e.g. from the 1st Battalion of the Mercian Regiment), one squadron of heavy armour (e.g. A Squadron of the Royal Tank Regiment), a company of engineers (e.g. B Company of the 22nd Engineer Regiment), a Battery of artillery (e.g. D Battery of the 1st Regiment of the Royal Horse Artillery) and smaller attachments from medical, logistic and intelligence units. Typically organised and commanded by a battlegroup headquarters and named after the unit which provided the most combat units, in this example, it would be the 1 Mercian Battlegroup. This creates a self-sustaining mixed formation of armour, infantry, artillery, engineers and support units, commanded by a lieutenant colonel.

== Recruitment ==
One of the most recognisable recruiting posters of the British Army; from World War I, with Lord Kitchener

The British Army primarily recruits from within the United Kingdom, but accept applications from all British citizens. It also accepts applications from Irish citizens and Commonwealth citizens, with certain restrictions. Since 2018 the British Army has been an equal-opportunity employer (with some legal exceptions due to medical standards), and does not discriminate based on race, religion or sexual orientation. Applicants for the Regular Army must be a minimum age of 16, although soldiers under 18 may not serve in operations, and the maximum age is 36. Applicants for the Army Reserve must be a minimum of 17 years and 9 months, and a maximum age of 43. Different age limits apply for Officers and those in some specialist roles. Applicants must also meet several other requirements, notably regarding medical health, physical fitness, past-criminal convictions, education, and regarding any tattoos and piercings.

Soldiers and officers in the Regular Army now enlist for an initial period of 12 years, with options to extend if they meet certain requirements. Soldiers and officers are normally required to serve for a minimum of 4 years from date of enlistment and must give 12 months' notice before leaving; soldiers who joined before the age of 18 years old are normally required to serve for a minimum of 6 years.

=== Oath of allegiance ===
All soldiers and commissioned officers must take an oath of allegiance upon joining the Army, a process known as attestation. Those who wish to swear by God use the following words:

I, [soldier's or commissioned officer's name], swear by Almighty God that I will be faithful and bear true allegiance to His Majesty King Charles III, his heirs and successors and that I will as in duty bound honestly and faithfully defend His Majesty, his heirs and successors in person, crown and dignity against all enemies and will observe and obey all orders of His Majesty, his heirs, and successors and of the generals and officers set over me.

Others replace the words "swear by Almighty God" with "solemnly, sincerely and truly declare and affirm".

=== Training ===
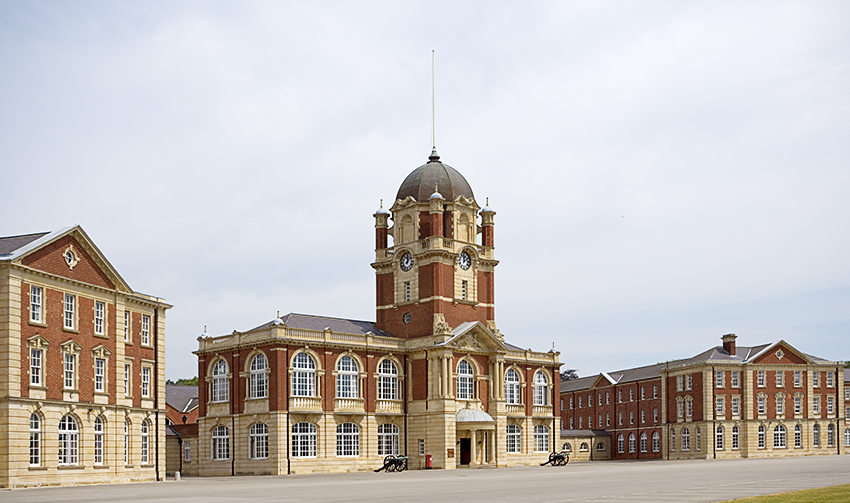
New College buildings at Royal Military Academy Sandhurst

Candidates for the Army undergo common training, beginning with initial military training, to bring all personnel to a similar standard in basic military skills, which is known as Phase 1 training. They then undertake further specialist trade-training for their specific regiment or corps, known as Phase 2 training. After completing Phase 1 training a soldier is counted against the Army's trained strength, and upon completion of Phase 2 are counted against the Army's fully trained trade strength.

Soldiers under the age of 17 and six months will complete Phase 1 training at the Army Foundation College. Infantry Soldiers will complete combined Phase 1 & 2 training at the Infantry Training Centre, Catterick, whilst all other Soldiers will attend Phase 1 training at the Army Training Centre Pirbright or Army Training Regiment, Winchester, and then complete Phase 2 training at different locations depending on their specialism. Officers conduct their initial training at the Royal Military Academy Sandhurst (RMAS), before also completing their Phase 2 training at multiple different locations.

== Flags and ensigns ==
The British Army's official flag is the Union Jack. The Army also has a non-ceremonial flag that is often seen flying from military buildings and is used at recruiting and military events and exhibitions. Traditionally most British Army units had a set of flags, known as the colours—normally a Regimental Colour and a King's Colour (the Union Jack). Historically these were carried into battle as a rallying point for the soldiers and were closely guarded. In modern units the colours are often prominently displayed, decorated with battle honours, and act as a focal point for Regimental pride. A soldier re-joining a regiment (upon recall from the reserve) is described as re-called to the Colours.

Official Army flag

Non-ceremonial army flag; "Army", in gold letters, sometimes appears below the badge.

Ensign for general use by the Royal Logistic Corps

Ensign flown by the Royal Logistic Corps from vessels commanded by commissioned officers

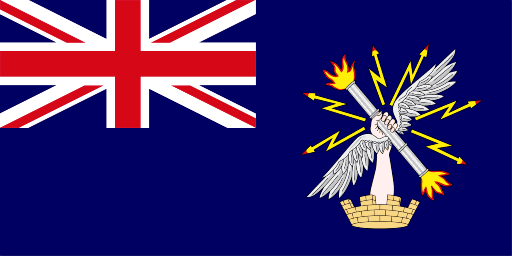
Ensign of the Corps of Royal Engineers

== Ranks and insignia ==
Rank insignia of the commissioned officers of the British Army
| Rank group | Field marshals | General officers | | | Field officers | | | | Junior officers | | | Officer cadets |
| NATO code | OF-10 | OF-9 | OF-8 | OF-7 | OF-6 | OF-5 | OF-4 | OF-3 | OF-2 | OF-1 | | N/A |
|---|---|---|---|---|---|---|---|---|---|---|---|---|
| Insignia | | | | | | | | | | | | |
| Rank | Field marshal | General | Lieutenant-general | Major-general | Brigadier | Colonel | Lieutenant colonel | Major | Captain | Lieutenant | Second lieutenant | Officer cadet |
| Abbreviation | FM | Gen | Lt Gen | Maj Gen | Brig | Col | Lt Col | Maj | Capt | Lt | 2Lt | OCdt |

Rank insignia of the other ranks of the British Army
| Rank group | Warrant officers | | | | Senior NCOs | | | Junior NCOs | | Soldiers | |
| NATO code | OR-9 | | OR-8 | | OR-7 | OR-6 | OR-5 | OR-4 | OR-3 | OR-2 | OR-1 |
|---|---|---|---|---|---|---|---|---|---|---|---|
| Insignia | | | | | | | | | | No insignia | |
| Typical appointment | Corps/command sergeant major (Note: The appointments of: Army command sergeant major; Command sergeant majors (including Royal Artillery sergeant major and the academy sergeant major, RMAS); Garrison sergeant major London district (royal arms on a four-bar chevron); Conductor, RLC (royal arms in a blue wreath); Master gunner, RA) | Regimental sergeant major (Note: The appointments of: Garrison sergeant major (except London district); Regimental corporal major; Regimental sergeant major; WO1 bandmaster (royal arms above a band badge); Staff sergeant major; RLC or AGC(SPS) sergeant major; Any other WO1 appointment on the establishment of a unit or corps e.g. artificer sergeant major, superintending draughtsman) | Regimental quartermaster sergeant (Note: The appointments of: Garrison quartermaster sergeant; Regimental quartermaster corporal/sergeant; Regimental quartermaster corporal/sergeant (technical); Staff quartermaster sergeant; Quartermaster sergeant instructor; Quartermaster sergeant; Farrier quartermaster corporal/sergeant; WO2 bandmaster (large crown)) | Squadron/battery/company sergeant major (Note: The appointments of: Squadron corporal major; Squadron, battery or company sergeant major (troop sergeant major in the Royal Horse Artillery only); WO2 bugle, drum, pipe or trumpet major (four-bar chevron, point upwards, below a large crown below a bugle, drum, pipes or crossed trumpets respectively); Any other WO2 appointment on the establishment of a unit or corps e.g. warrant officer instructor, class 2 (physical training)) | Squadron/battery/company quartermaster sergeant (Note: The appointments of: Squadron quartermaster corporal; Squadron, battery or company quartermaster sergeant (troop quartermaster sergeant in the Royal Horse Artillery only); Colour sergeant or company quartermaster sergeant (foot guards and infantry); Staff sergeant rank bugle, drum, pipe or trumpet major (four-bar chevron, point upwards, below a small crown below a bugle, drum, pipes or crossed trumpets respectively); Any other staff sergeant appointment on the establishment of a unit e.g. clerk of works staff sergeant; staff sergeant instructor; artificer staff sergeant, staff sergeant rank bandmaster) | | | | | | |
| Rank | Warrant officer class 1 | | Warrant officer class 2 | | Staff/colour sergeant | Sergeant (Note: Also the appointments of: Sergeant rank bugle, drum, pipe or trumpet major; Any other sergeant appointment on the establishment of a unit e.g. pioneer sergeant, sergeant instructor, band sergeant) | | Corporal | Lance corporal | Private (or equivalent) (Note: Trooper; Gunner; Sapper; Signaller; Guardsman; Fusilier; Kingsman; Rifleman; Ranger; Airtrooper; Craftsman; Musician) | |
| Abbreviation | WO1 | | WO2 | | SSgt/CSgt | Sgt | | Cpl | LCpl | Pte | |

Most ranks across the British Army are known by the same name regardless of which regiment they are in. However, the Household Cavalry call many ranks by different names, the Royal Artillery refer to corporals as bombardiers, the Rifles spell sergeant as serjeant, and Private soldiers are known by a wide variety of titles; notably trooper, gunner, guardsman, kingsman, sapper, signaller, fusilier, craftsman and rifleman dependent on the regiment they belong to. These names do not affect a soldier's pay or role.

== Reserve forces ==
The oldest of the Reserve Forces was the Militia Force (also referred to as the Constitutional Force), which (in the Kingdom of England, prior to 1707) was originally the main military defensive force (until the 1645 creation of the New Model Army, there otherwise were originally only Royal bodyguards, including the Yeomen Warders and the Yeomen of the Guard, with armies raised only temporarily for expeditions overseas), made up of civilians embodied for annual training or emergencies, which had used various schemes of compulsory service during different periods of its long existence. From the 1850s it recruited volunteers who engaged for terms of service. The Militia was originally an all-infantry force, though Militia coastal artillery, field artillery, and engineers units were introduced from the 1850s.

Volunteer Force units were also frequently raised during wartime and disbanded upon peace. This was re-established as a permanent (i.e., in war and peace) part of the Reserve Forces in 1859. It differed from the Militia in a number of ways, most particularly in that volunteers did not commit to a term service, and were able to resign with fourteen days notice (except while embodied). As volunteer soldiers were originally expected to fund the cost of their own equipment, few tended to come from the labouring class among whom the Militia primarily recruited.

The Yeomanry Force was made up of mounted units, organised similarly to the Volunteer Force, first raised during the two decades of war with France that followed the French Revolution. As with the Volunteers, members of the Yeomanry were expected to foot much of the cost of their own equipment, including their horses, and the make-up of the units tended to be from more affluent classes.

Although Militia regiments were linked with British Army regiments during the course of the Napoleonic Wars to feed volunteers for service abroad into the regular army, and volunteers from the Reserve Forces served abroad either individually or in contingents, service companies, or battalions in a succession of conflicts from the Crimean War to the Second Boer War, personnel did not normally move between forces unless re-attested as a member of the new force, and units did not normally move from the Reserve Forces to become part of the Regular Forces, or vice versa. There were exceptions, however, as with the New Brunswick Regiment of Fencible Infantry, raised in 1803, which became the 104th (New Brunswick) Regiment of Foot when it was transferred to the British Army on 13 September 1810.

Another type of reserve force was created during the period between the French Revolution and the end of the Napoleonic Wars. Called Fencibles, these were disbanded after the Napoleonic Wars and not raised again, although the Royal Malta Fencible Regiment, later the Royal Malta Fencible Artillery, existed from 1815 until the 1880s when it became the Royal Malta Artillery, and the Royal New Zealand Fencible Corps was formed in 1846.

The Reserve Forces were raised locally (in Britain, under the control of Lords-Lieutenant of counties, and, in British colonies, under the colonial governors, and members originally were obliged to serve only within their locality (which, in the United Kingdom, originally meant within the county or other recruitment area, but was extended to anywhere in Britain, though not overseas). They have consequently also been referred to as Local Forces. As they were (and in some cases are) considered separate forces from the British Army, though still within the British military, they have also been known as Auxiliary Forces. The Militia and Volunteer units of a colony were generally considered to be separate forces from the Home Militia Force and Volunteer Force in the United Kingdom, and from the Militia Forces and Volunteer Forces of other colonies. Where a colony had more than one Militia or Volunteer unit, they would be grouped as a Militia or Volunteer Force for that colony, such as the Jamaica Volunteer Defence Force. Officers of the Reserve Forces could not sit on Courts Martial of regular forces personnel. The Mutiny Act did not apply to members of the Reserve Forces. The Reserve Forces within the British Isles were increasingly integrated with the British Army through a succession of reforms (beginning with the Cardwell Reforms) of the British military forces over the last two decades of the Nineteenth Century and the early years of the Twentieth Century, whereby the Reserve Forces units mostly lost their own identities and became numbered Militia or Volunteer battalions of regular British Army corps or regiments.

In 1908, the Yeomanry and Volunteer Force were merged to create the Territorial Force (changed to Territorial Army after the First World War), with terms of service similar to the army and Militia, and the Militia was renamed the Special Reserve, After the First World War the Special Reserve was renamed the Militia, again, but permanently suspended (although a handful of Militia units survived in the United Kingdom, its colonies, and the Crown Dependencies). Although the Territorial Force was nominally still a separate force from the British Army, by the end of the century, at the latest, any unit wholly or partly funded from Army Funds was considered part of the British Army. Outside the United Kingdom-proper, this was generally only the case for those units in the Channel Islands or the Imperial fortress colonies (Nova Scotia, before Canadian confederation; Bermuda; Gibraltar; and Malta).

The Bermuda Militia Artillery, Bermuda Militia Infantry, Bermuda Volunteer Engineers, and the Bermuda Volunteer Rifle Corps, by example were paid for by the War Office and considered part of the British Army, with their officers appearing as such in the Army List unlike those of many other colonial units deemed auxiliaries. Today, the British Army is the only Home British military force, including the various other forces it has absorbed, though British military units organised on Territorial Army lines remain in British Overseas Territories that are still not considered formally part of the British Army, with only the Royal Gibraltar Regiment and the Royal Bermuda Regiment (an amalgam of the old Bermuda Militia Artillery and Bermuda Volunteer Rifle Corps) appearing on the British Army order-of-precedence and in the Army List, as well as on the Corps Warrant (the official list of those British military forces that are considered corps of the British Army).

In October 2012 the Ministry of Defence announced that the Territorial Army was to be renamed the Army Reserve.

== Uniforms ==
The British Army uniform has sixteen categories, ranging from ceremonial uniforms to combat dress to evening wear. No. 8 Dress, the day-to-day uniform, is known as "Personal Clothing System – Combat Uniform" (PCS-CU) and consists of a Multi-Terrain Pattern (MTP) windproof smock, a lightweight jacket and trousers with ancillary items such as thermals and waterproofs. The army has introduced tactical recognition flashes (TRFs); worn on the right arm of a combat uniform, the insignia denotes the wearer's regiment or corps. In addition to working dress, the army has a number of parade uniforms for ceremonial and non-ceremonial occasions. The most-commonly-seen uniforms are No. 1 Dress (full ceremonial, seen at formal occasions such as at the changing of the guard at Buckingham Palace) and No. 2 Dress (Service Dress), a brown khaki uniform worn for non-ceremonial parades.

Working headdress is typically a beret, whose colour indicates its wearer's type of regiment. Beret colours include:

- Khaki—Foot Guards, Honourable Artillery Company, Princess of Wales's Royal Regiment, Royal Anglian Regiment, Royal Welsh, Royal Yorkshire Regiment
- Light grey—Royal Scots Dragoon Guards
- Brown—King's Royal Hussars, Royal Wessex Yeomanry
- Black—Royal Tank Regiment
- Dark (rifle) green—Royal Dragoon Guards, The Rifles, Royal Gurkha Rifles, Small Arms School Corps
- Maroon—Parachute Regiment
- Beige—Special Air Service
- Sky blue—Army Air Corps
- Cypress green—Intelligence Corps
- Scarlet—Royal Military Police
- Green—Adjutant General's Corps
- Navy blue—All other units, such as the Household Cavalry, Light Dragoons, Queen's Dragoon Guards, Royal Yeomanry, and the Royal Regiment of Fusiliers
- Emerald grey—Special Reconnaissance Regiment
- Gun-metal grey—The Ranger Regiment

== See also ==
- Army 2020 Refine
- Army Cadet Force
- Army Reserve (United Kingdom)
- British Army order of precedence
- British campaign medals
- Corps Warrant
- List of British Army installations
- List of British Army regiments and corps
- List of equipment of the British Army
- List of military weapons of the United Kingdom
- List of roles in the British Army
- List of wars involving England
- List of wars involving Scotland
- List of wars involving the United Kingdom
- Military bands of the United Kingdom
- Military history of the United Kingdom
- Ministry of Defence (United Kingdom)
- Red coat (military uniform)
- Royal Air Force
- Royal Navy
- "Rule, Britannia!"
- Strategic Defence and Security Review 2015
- Tommy Atkins
- Uniforms of the British Army
- United Kingdom Special Forces

== Bibliography ==
- Bates, Gill (2010). Rising Star: China's New Security Diplomacy. Brookings Institution Press. p. 25. ISBN 978-0-8157-0453-9.
- BBC staff (6 January 2007). "Recruitment Age for Army Raised". BBC News. Archived from the original on 8 February 2012.
- Beevor, Antony (1990). Inside the British Army. London: Chatto & Windus. ISBN 0-7011-3466-6.
- Buchanan, Michael (27 November 2008). "Irish swell ranks of UK military". BBC.
- Burnside, Iain (19 May 2010). "Songs for squaddies: the war musical Lads in Their Hundreds". The Guardian.
- Cassidy, Robert M (2006). Counterinsurgency and the global war on terror: military culture and irregular war. Greenwood Publishing Group. ISBN 0-275-98990-9.
- Chisholm, Hugh, ed. (1911). "Constantinople" . Encyclopædia Britannica. Vol. 7 (11th ed.). Cambridge University Press. p. 3.
- Chandler, David; Beckett, Ian, eds. (2003). The Oxford History of the British Army. Oxford Paperbacks.
- Connolly, Sean J. (1998). The Oxford Companion to Irish history. Oxford: Oxford University Press. p. 505. ISBN 978-0-19-211695-6.
- Ensor, (Sir) Robert (1980) [1936]. England: 1870–1914. (The Oxford History of England). Vol. XIV (Revised ed.). Oxford: Oxford University Press. ISBN 0-19-821705-6.
- Fremont-Barnes, Gregory (2009). Who Dares Wins – The SAS and the Iranian Embassy Siege 1980. Osprey Publishing. ISBN 978-1-84603-395-7.
- French, David. Army, Empire, and Cold War: The British Army and Military Policy, 1945–1971 (2012) doi:10.1093/acprof:oso/9780199548231.001.0001
- Gilbert, Martin (2005). Churchill and America. Simon & Schuster. p. 301. ISBN 0-7432-9122-0.
- Heyman, Charles (2009). The Armed Forces of the United Kingdom 2010–2011. Pen & Sword. ISBN 978-1-84884-084-3.
- Holmes, Richard (2002). Redcoat: The British soldier in the Age of Horse and Musket. HarperCollins. pp. 48, 55–57, 59–65, 177–8. ISBN 978-0-00-653152-4.
- Holmes, Richard (2011). Soldiers: Army Lives and Loyalties from Redcoat to Dusty Warriors. HarperCollins.
- Linch, Kevin, and Matthew Lord, eds. Redcoats to Tommies: The Experience of the British Soldier from the Eighteenth Century (Boydell Press, 2021) Online review of this book.
- Linch, Kevin (2024). The British Army, 1783–1815. Barnsley: Pen & Sword Books. ISBN 9781526737991.
- Mallinson, Allan (2009). The Making of the British Army. Bantam Press. ISBN 978-0-593-05108-5.
- McGarrigle, Heather (6 December 2010). "British army sees more Irish recruits". Belfast Telegraph.
- McKernan, Michael (2005). Northern Ireland in 1897–2004 Yearbook. Stationery Office. p. 17. ISBN 978-0-9546284-2-0.
- Miller, John (2000). James II. Yale University Press. ISBN 978-0-300-08728-4.
- Norton-Taylor, Richard (5 April 2008). "Commonwealth recruitment caps & current commonwealth troop levels". The Guardian. London. Archived from the original on 28 April 2011.
- OED staff (June 2013). "Rupert, n.". Oxford English Dictionary (Online ed.). Oxford University Press.
- OED staff (June 2013). "Taffy, n.2". Oxford English Dictionary (Online ed.). Oxford University Press.
- Ó Siochrú, Micheál (2008). God's Executioner: Oliver Cromwell and the Conquest of Ireland. Faber and Faber. ISBN 978-0-571-24121-7.
- Ripley, Tim (10 December 2008). "UK Army Air Corps received Dauphins". Jane's Defence Weekly. 45 (50): 10.
- Rogers, Colonel H.C.B. (1968). Battles and Generals of the Civil Wars. Seeley Service & Company.
- Royal Scots Greys (1840). Historical record of the Royal regiment of Scots dragoons: now the Second, or Royal North British dragoons, commonly called the Scots greys, to 1839. pp. 56–57.
- Sharrock, David (10 September 2008). "Irish recruits sign up for British Army in cross-border revolution". The Times. London. Archived from the original on 29 April 2011.
- "British Army Expansion". The Sydney Morning Herald. 26 October 1939. p. 8.
- Strawson, John (1989). Gentlemen in Khaki: The British Army 1890–1990. Secker & Warburg. ISBN 978-0-4364-9994-4.
- Taylor, AJP (1976). The Second World War an illustrated history. Penguin books. ISBN 0-14-004135-4.
- Taylor, Claire; Brooke-Holland, Louisa (28 February 2012). "Armed Forces Redundancies" (PDF). House of Commons.
- Warwick, Nigel W. M. (2014). In every place: The RAF Armoured Cars in the Middle East 1921–1953. Rushden, Northamptonshire, England: Forces & Corporate Publishing Ltd. ISBN 978-0-9574725-2-5.
