= Royal Bermuda Regiment =

Infantry regiment of the British Army

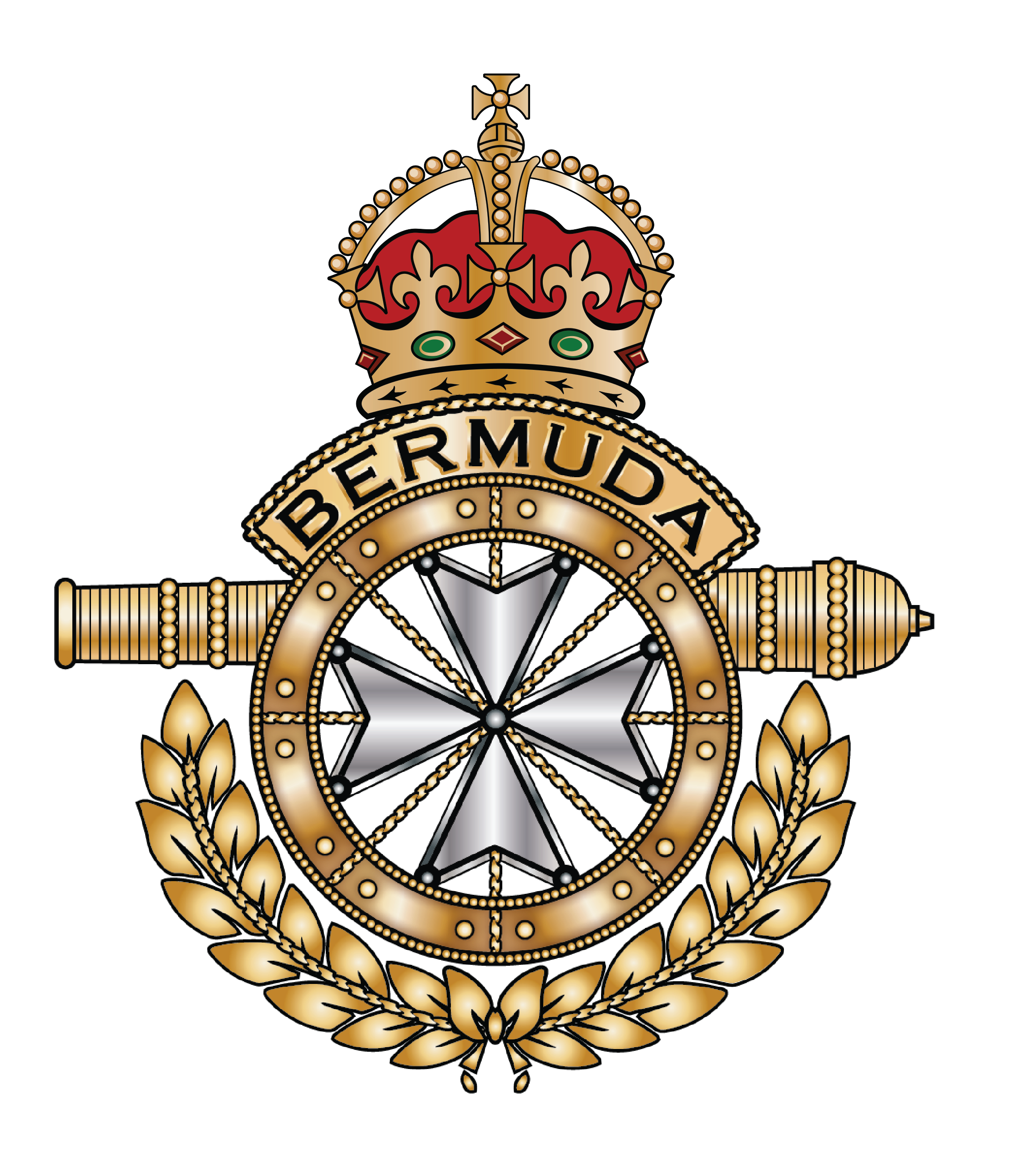
- Regimental cap badge
- Active: 1 September 1965 – present
- Country: Bermuda
- Allegiance: United Kingdom
- Branch: British Army
- Type: Infantry
- Role: Internal security
- Size: One battalion 250 personnel (2025)
- Garrison/HQ: Warwick Camp
- March: Quick – Bermuda
- Anniversaries: 21 November 1965, presentation of the first colours.
- Website: www.rbr.bm

Commanders
- Commanding Officer: Lt. Col. Duncan Simons
- Colonel-in-Chief: Birgitte, Duchess of Gloucester
- Honorary Colonel: Col. David Gibbons

The Royal Bermuda Regiment (RBR) is a reserve regiment of the British Army, tasked as the home defence unit of the British Overseas Territory of Bermuda. It is a single territorial infantry battalion that was formed on the amalgamation in 1965 of two originally voluntary units, the mostly black Bermuda Militia Artillery (BMA) and the almost entirely white Bermuda Rifles (titled the Bermuda Volunteer Rifle Corps (BVRC) until 1949), and the only remaining component of the Bermuda Garrison since the 1957 withdrawal of regular units and detachments from Bermuda.

== History ==
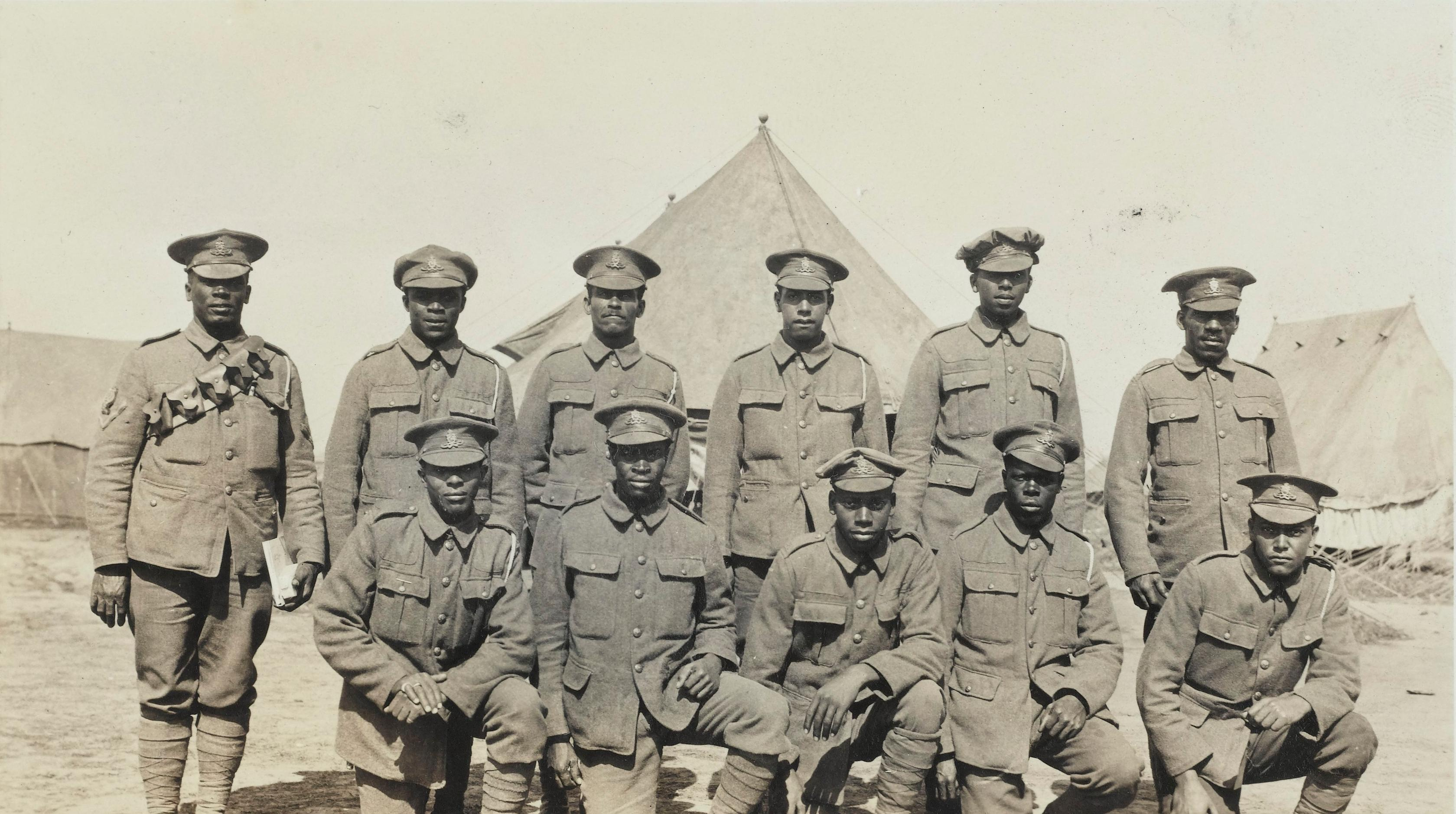
Soldiers of the Bermuda Contingent of the Royal Garrison Artillery (BMA) in a Casualty Clearing Station on the Western Front in July 1916

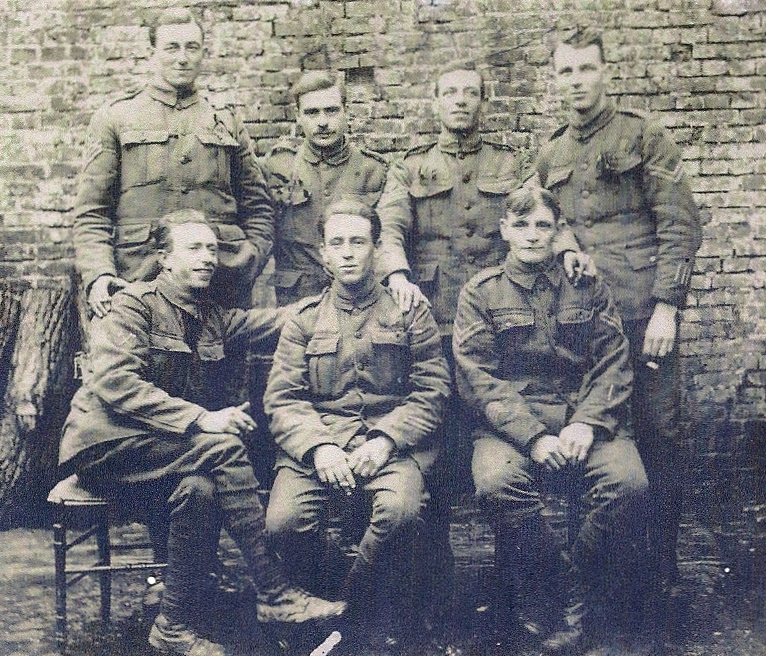
Bermuda Volunteer Rifle Corps soldiers serving on the Western Front with the Lincolnshire Regiment, 1918

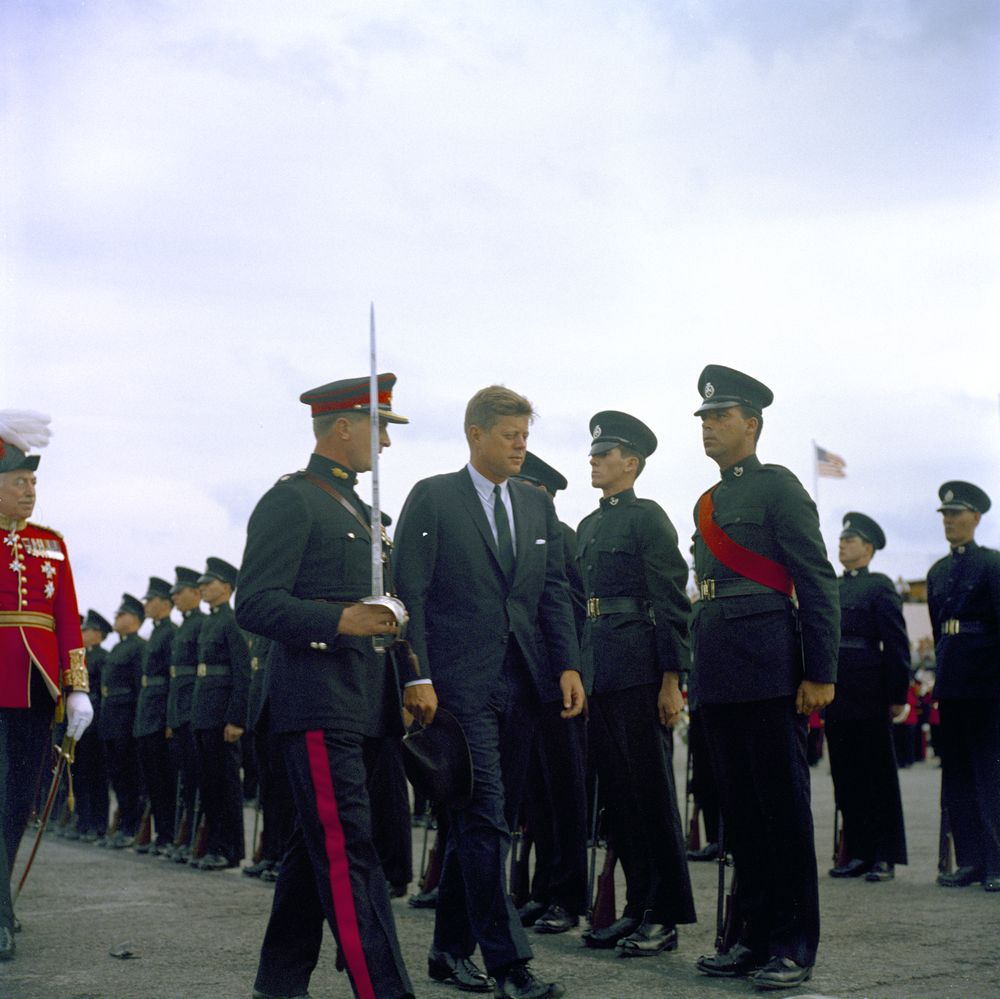
John F. Kennedy, escorted by a Bermuda Militia Artillery officer in Royal Artillery blue No. 1 Dress, inspects green-uniformed riflemen of the Bermuda Rifles in 1961

The two original units, the mostly black Bermuda Militia Artillery and the almost entirely white Bermuda Volunteer Rifle Corps, were raised in 1895 and 1894, respectively, in accordance with two of three bills drafted by the War Office and enacted by the Bermudian parliament in 1892 at the insistence of the British Government, which had been attempting to encourage, entice, or coerce the local government to restore reserve military units since the last Militia Act had been allowed to lapse following the Napoleonic Wars and the American War of 1812. The regulations of the two units were the same as those of militia and volunteer units in the British Isles at the time, with a few additions specific to the units. The units were fully funded by the War Office as parts of the British Army, rather than as auxiliary to it. Contingents from both units were deployed to France and Belgium in June 1915 and saw action on the Western Front during the First World War.

Following the First World War, the British Government's policy of austerity resulted in a substantial reduction of the regular army, including reducing the regular infantry in Bermuda and removing the Royal Artillery and the Royal Engineers Fortress companies from Bermuda in 1928, with the local reserve units shouldering more responsibility. This resulted in the Bermuda Volunteer Rifle Corps being re-organised on territorial lines in 1921. Those other ranks who chose to continue serving were re-attested, committing to terms of service which meant they could no longer quit the corps with fourteen days notice. The name of the corps was not modified to reflect the change, however. Militia soldiers were already engaged for terms of service, and the Bermuda Militia Artillery was not similarly re-organised until 1928 (its name, also, was not modified to reflect the change). The Bermuda Volunteer Engineers was created as a unit to operate the search lights at coastal artillery batteries in June 1931 (previously, the third act of 1892 had authorised the creation of a militia unit to assist the Royal Engineers company tasked with maintaining and operating Bermuda's submarine mining defences, but this unit had not been raised), while the Bermuda Militia Infantry was raised in October 1939, originally relieving the Bermuda Volunteer Rifle Corps of the task of protecting St David's Battery from attack by enemy landing parties, but taking on new roles as it expanded to a strength of two companies, with the infantry defence of the colony being split between the regular infantry (by then a detachment of 4th Battalion, Queen's Own Cameron Highlanders), the Bermuda Volunteer Rifle Corps and the Bermuda Militia Infantry.

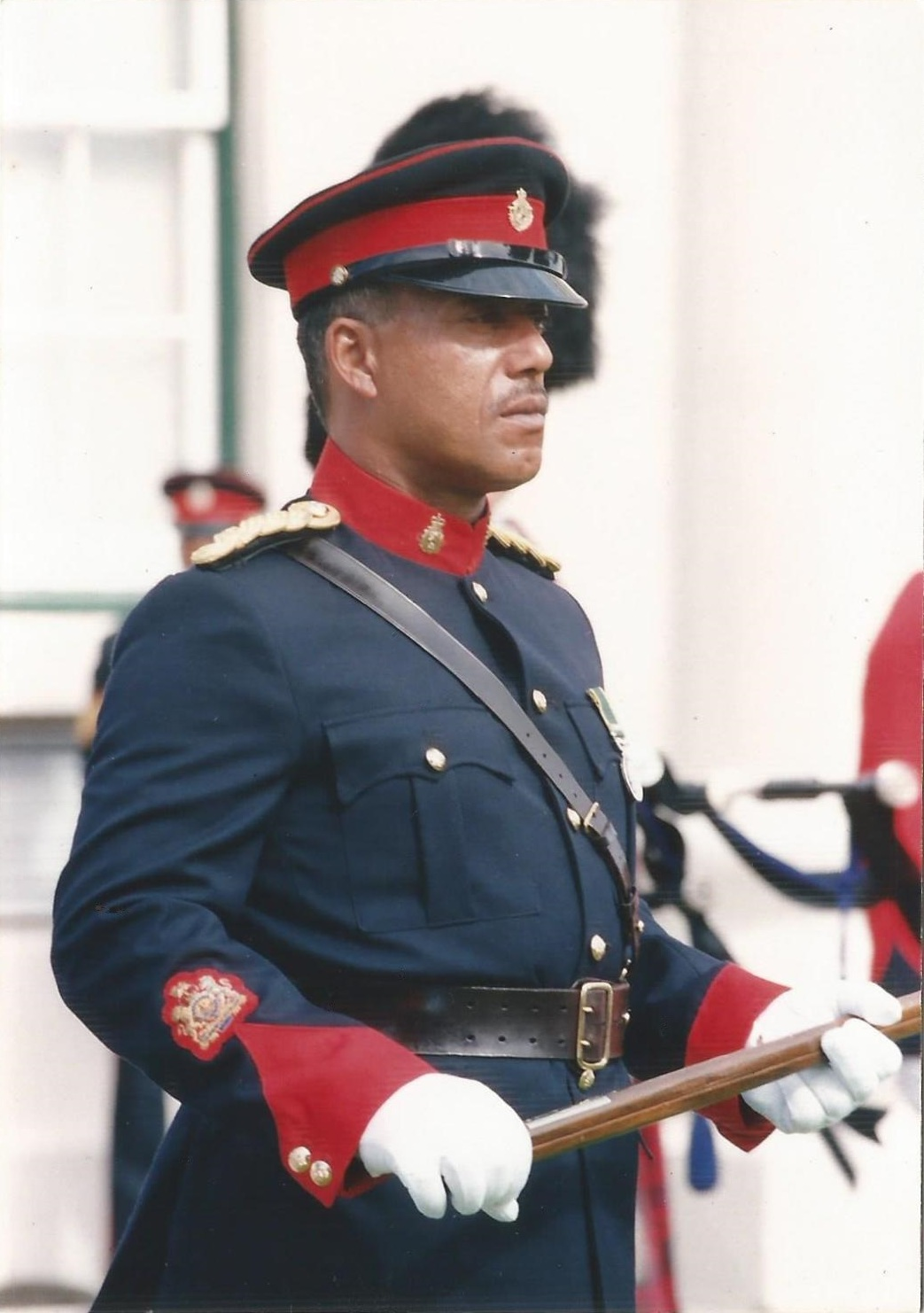
RSM of the Bermuda Regiment WO1 Herman Eve in 1992

A contingent of volunteers for overseas service from the Bermuda Militia Artillery (one officer), Bermuda Volunteer Engineers (four sappers), and Bermuda Volunteer Rifle Corps (sixteen officers and other ranks) was sent to Britain in June, 1940, where the contingent members separated to join their parent corps (Royal Artillery, Royal Engineers, and the Lincolnshire regiment, respectively). With the regular garrison having been drastically reduced due to post-First World War economic austerity by the British Government, concern over further weakening the garrison meant the local-service units, which had been embodied for full-time service for the duration of the war, were barred from sending further contingents abroad until 1943, by which time the threat of enemy attacks on Bermuda and its strategic defence infrastructure had greatly diminished and the United States Army and United states Marine Corps had garrisoned the colony. Following this, a contingent of volunteers from the Bermuda Militia Artillery and Bermuda Militia Infantry was attached to the 1st Caribbean Regiment and saw action in Europe and North Africa during the Second World War while a company from the Bermuda Volunteer Rifle Corps was attached to the Lincolnshire Regiment and saw action in North West Europe and in Burma during that war. The two contingents had been grouped together in 1943 as the Command Training Battalion, stationed at Prospect Camp while training in preparation for deployment to Europe.

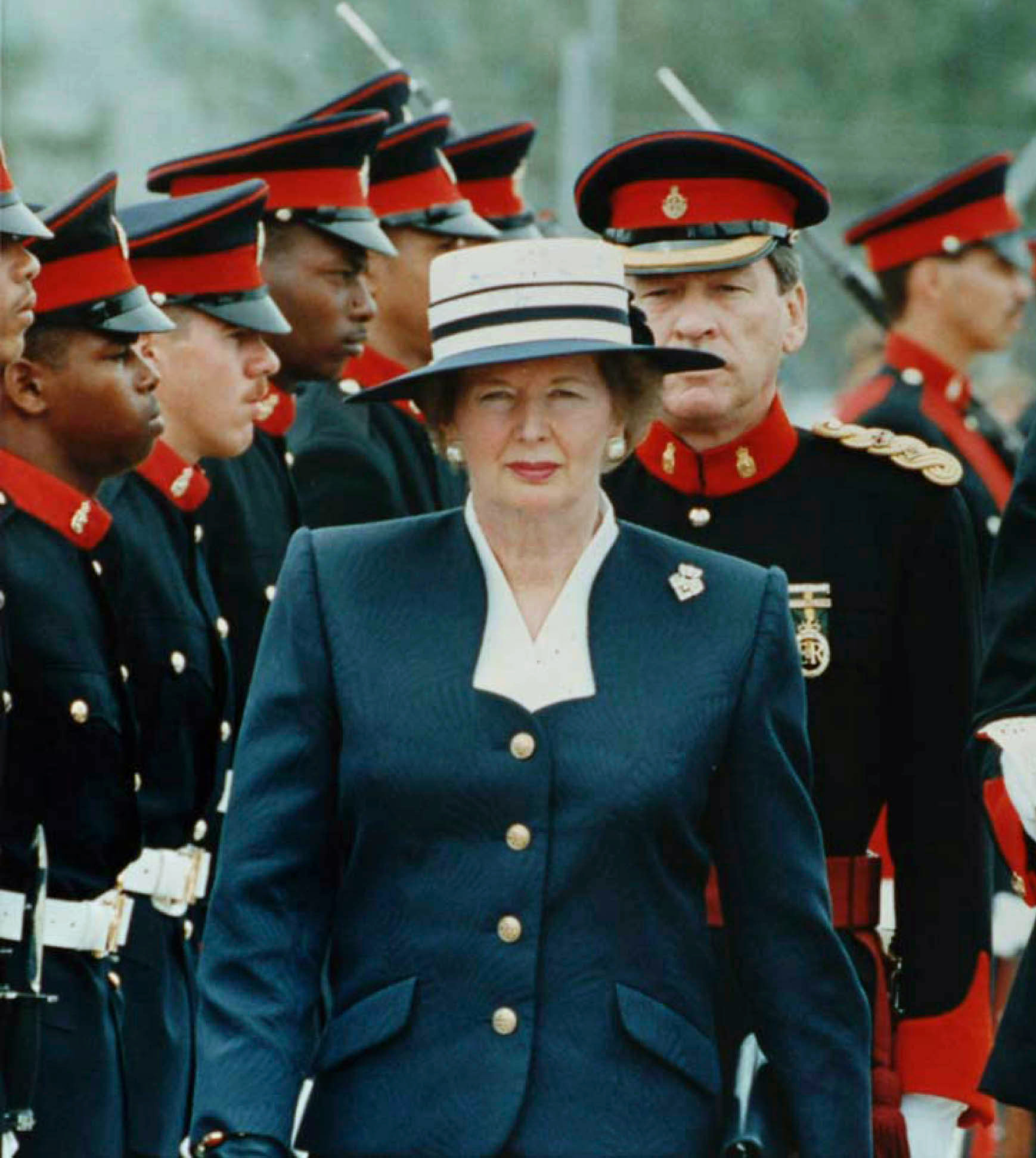
Margaret Thatcher reviewing the Royal Bermuda Regiment in early 1990

After the war the Bermuda Volunteer Rifle Corps was belatedly renamed the Bermuda Rifles. The Bermuda Militia Artillery, however, was not renamed. Following the closure of the Royal Navy's dockyard commenced in 1951 (a process that lasted until 1958, leaving only a small naval base, HMS Malabar, within the former dockyard), the military garrison, which had existed primarily to protect the Royal Navy base, was also closed.

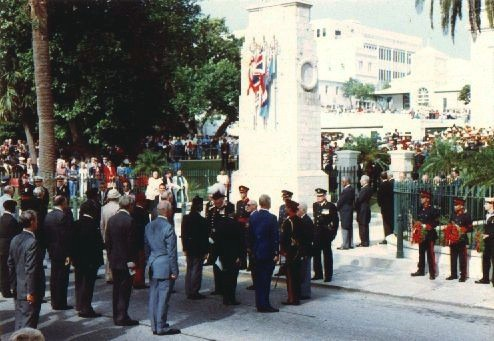
Remembrance Day parade, at the Cenotaph, in the City of Hamilton, 1990. HE The Governor, Major-General Sir Desmond Langley, inspects war veterans, and is speaking with former Second-in-Command of the Royal Bermuda Regiment Major Donald Henry "Bob" Burns, MC, ED.

The Bermuda Militia Artillery and the Bermuda Rifles amalgamated to form the Bermuda Regiment on 1 September 1965. The new Bermuda Regiment's stand of colours was presented in November 1965 by Princess Margaret. Princess Margaret presented a second stand of colours to replace the first in November 1990 to mark the Bermuda Regiment's 25th anniversary. The latest set of Colours were presented by Duchess of Gloucester, GCVO, at the National Sports Centre on 13 November 2010. In 1945, the part-time reserve units in Bermuda, the Channel Islands and Malta had numbered collectively as 28th in the British Army order of precedence (the number varied before and after 1945 depending on the make-up of the British Army), but were ordered within that according to the order of precedence of their parent corps in the regular army. This meant, that the Bermuda Militia Artillery (BMA), as part of the Royal Regiment of Artillery and the Militia, preceded the Bermuda Volunteer Rifle Corps (BVRC) (as part of the infantry and the Volunteer Force) despite being the second of the two to be raised. Today, the Royal Bermuda Regiment, as an amalgam of the BMA and BVRC, is 29th and was formerly 28th which changed in 2007 with the Special Reconnaissance Regiment being added to the Order of Precedence.

On 1 September 2015, Queen Elizabeth II awarded the title "Royal" to the regiment to mark the 50th anniversary of its formation.

In 2024, King Charles III authorised the creation of a new decoration, the Operational Service Medal, to be awarded to Royal Bermuda Regiment soldiers who have performed 30 days operational service in disaster relief efforts, humanitarian assistance, security or other emergency operations at any time since 1965, whether for internal security or other emergency operations on local service in Bermuda or for overseas service (as the regiment has frequently deployed detachments to the West Indies to assist with post-hurricane relief).

== Badge ==
The badge of the Royal Bermuda Regiment combines elements from those of the Royal Regiment of Artillery, and the BVRC. The full badge, as displayed on the Colours, features two crossed cannons creating an X behind a Maltese cross (the symbol of rifle regiments in the British Army, and used on the white metal BVRC badge), set on a circular shield with "THE BERMUDA REGIMENT" inscribed around it, and the whole enclosed within a wreath and surmounted by the Crown. The cap badge is bi-metal – all brass, except a white metal Maltese cross, which is set inside the wheel of a cannon (taken from the badge of the Royal Artillery), with a half-wreath about the lower hemisphere of the badge. Flashes, and other colour marks used on dress and elsewhere (such as backgrounds on signs about Warwick Camp) are blue and red, reflecting the colours of the Royal Artillery, but the stable belt (issued only to permanent staff, officers and senior ranks) worn is rifle green, with black edges, referring to the colours used by the BVRC.

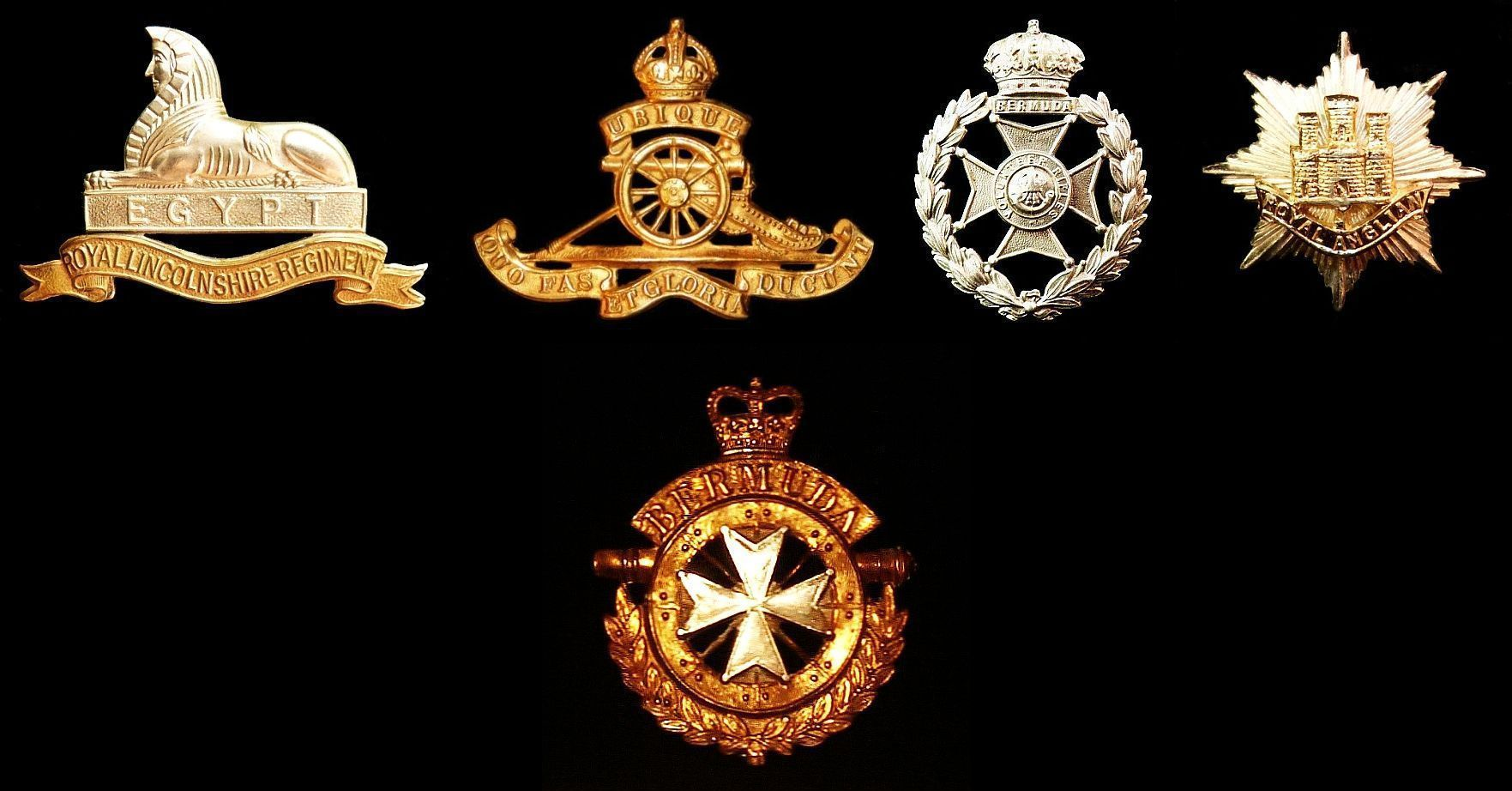
The badge of the Royal Bermuda Regiment (bottom) draws elements from those of the BMA (Royal Artillery, second from left) and the BVRC (second from right). The badge at the left is that of the Royal Lincolnshire Regiment, affiliated to the BVRC, and that at the right belongs to the Royal Anglian Regiment, its successor.

== Dress ==
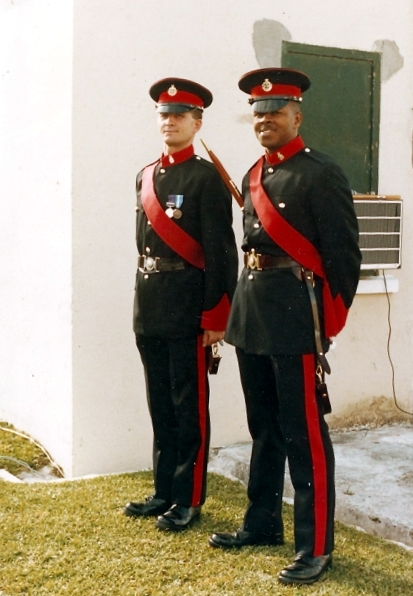
Bermuda Regiment Warrant Officers in the No. 1 dress

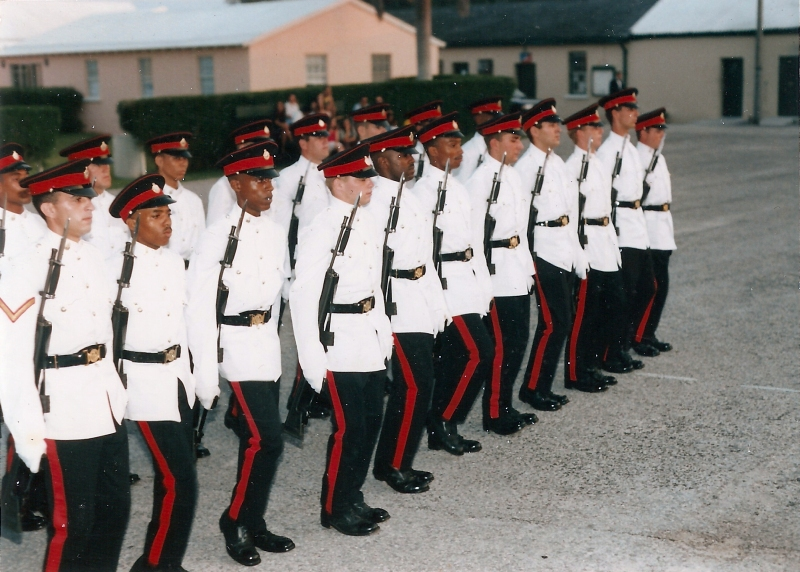
Potential Non-Commissioned Officers (PNCO) Cadre Promotion Parade in No. 3 (Summer) Dress at Warwick Camp in June, 1994.

The dress uniform itself is closer to the old Royal Artillery pattern, and to the generic No. 1 dress uniform used by many British regiments today, being composed of dark blue, almost black, tunic and trousers, and differing only in the red cuffs and collar added to the tunic. The trousers have a broad red stripe running down the outside of each leg. A generic dark blue peaked cap with red hat band is worn with this uniform. During the summer months, the No. 3 uniform is worn (identical to the No. 1 except that a light-weight generic, white tunic is worn).

== Ranks ==
Ranks are as follows:

Rank group	General / flag officers	Senior officers	Junior officers
Royal Bermuda Regiment
Royal Bermuda Regiment		Lieutenant colonel	Major	Captain	Lieutenant	Second lieutenant	Officer cadet

Rank group	Senior NCOs				Junior NCOs		Enlisted
Royal Bermuda Regiment							No insignia
Royal Bermuda Regiment	Warrant officer class 1	Warrant officer class 2	Colour Sergeant	Sergeant	Corporal	Lance corporal	Private

== Organisation ==
=== Leadership ===
A Command Centre during IS training.

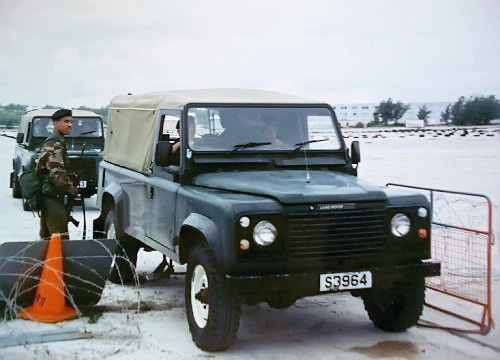
PNCO Cadre train in Internal Security (IS) role.

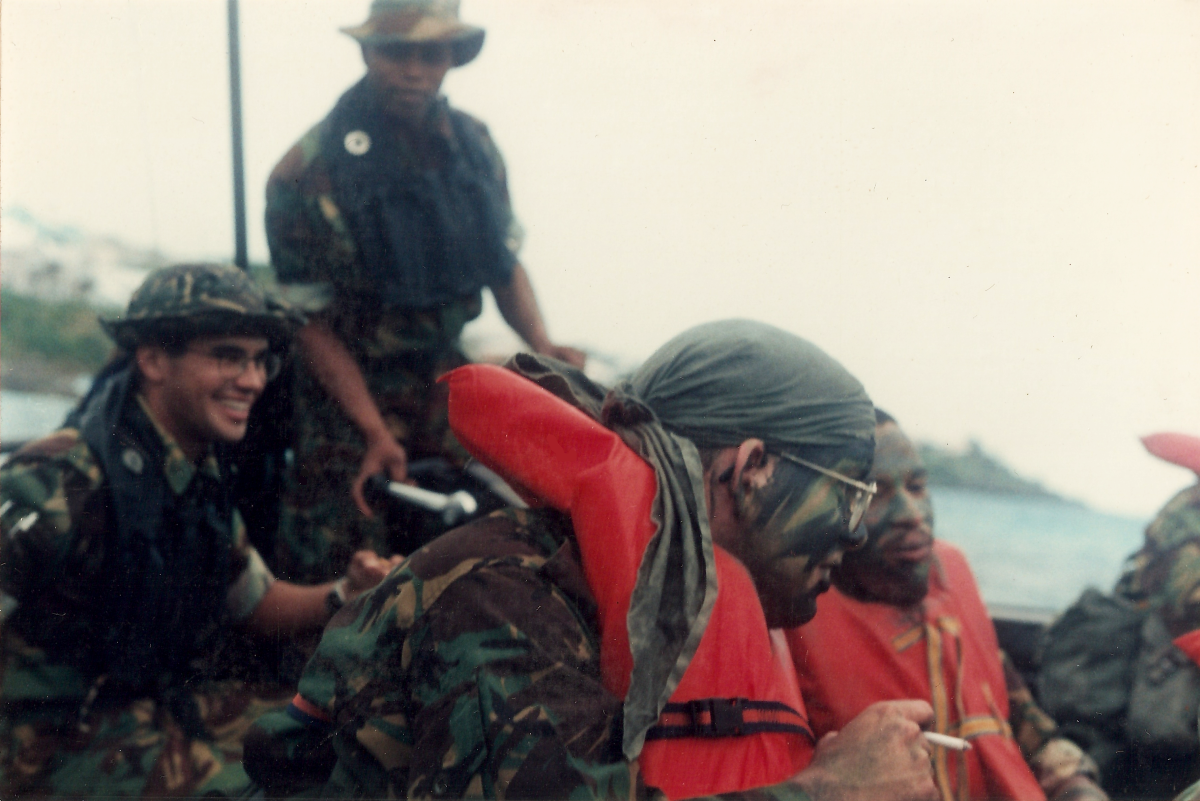
Bermuda Regiment soldiers aboard a motor boat, off the North Shore of Bermuda, 1996.

As Bermuda is a British overseas territory, and defence is therefore the responsibility of the United Kingdom, the Royal Bermuda Regiment is under the control of the Governor and Commander-in-Chief of the island. However, pay and financing is the responsibility of the Ministry of National Security. The Royal Bermuda Regiment (RBR) is listed in the British Army Order of Battle as number 29th in order of precedence. The RBR traditionally was number 28th in the order of precedence but due to the first time listing on the order of precedence of the Special Reconnaissance Regiment which is the newest Combat Arm/Corp.

On its formation, the regiment's Honorary Colonel was Princess Margaret, Countess of Snowdon, who became Colonel-in-Chief in 1984. After the countess's death in 2002, the Duchess of Gloucester was made Colonel-in-Chief in 2006.

=== Manpower ===
The Regiment's original strength was about 400, including all ranks. Following discipline problems during an exercise in the West Indies, a report on the unit was commissioned from Major-General Glyn Gilbert, the highest-ranking Bermudian in the British Army. Maj-Gen. Gilbert also took into account the difficulties the regiment had experienced in meeting its obligations when deployed during the civil unrest of 1977 (its existing strength did not allow for a reserve). He made a number of recommendations, including the increase of the Regiment's strength to a full battalion of about 750, with three rifle companies (A, B, and C) and a support company. As the support functions (Regimental Quartermaster Stores and Internal Security Stores, Signals, Armourers, Motor Transport, Boat Troop, Gun Troop/Assault Pioneers, Medics, cooks, et cetera) and the Band now fell under Support Company (commanded by the Regimental Quartermaster), the battalion headquarters was no longer considered a company in its own right. Initially, the three rifle companies rotated through the role of training company. Eventually, C Company was renamed permanent Training Company. Recruits spent their first year in Training Company, then transferred as a unit to whichever rifle company was losing its third-year conscripts, or were reassigned individually to other sub-units. As of the early 2020s, the regiment's strength-level was about 350 personnel who had a total training commitment of 30-days per year.

=== Structure ===
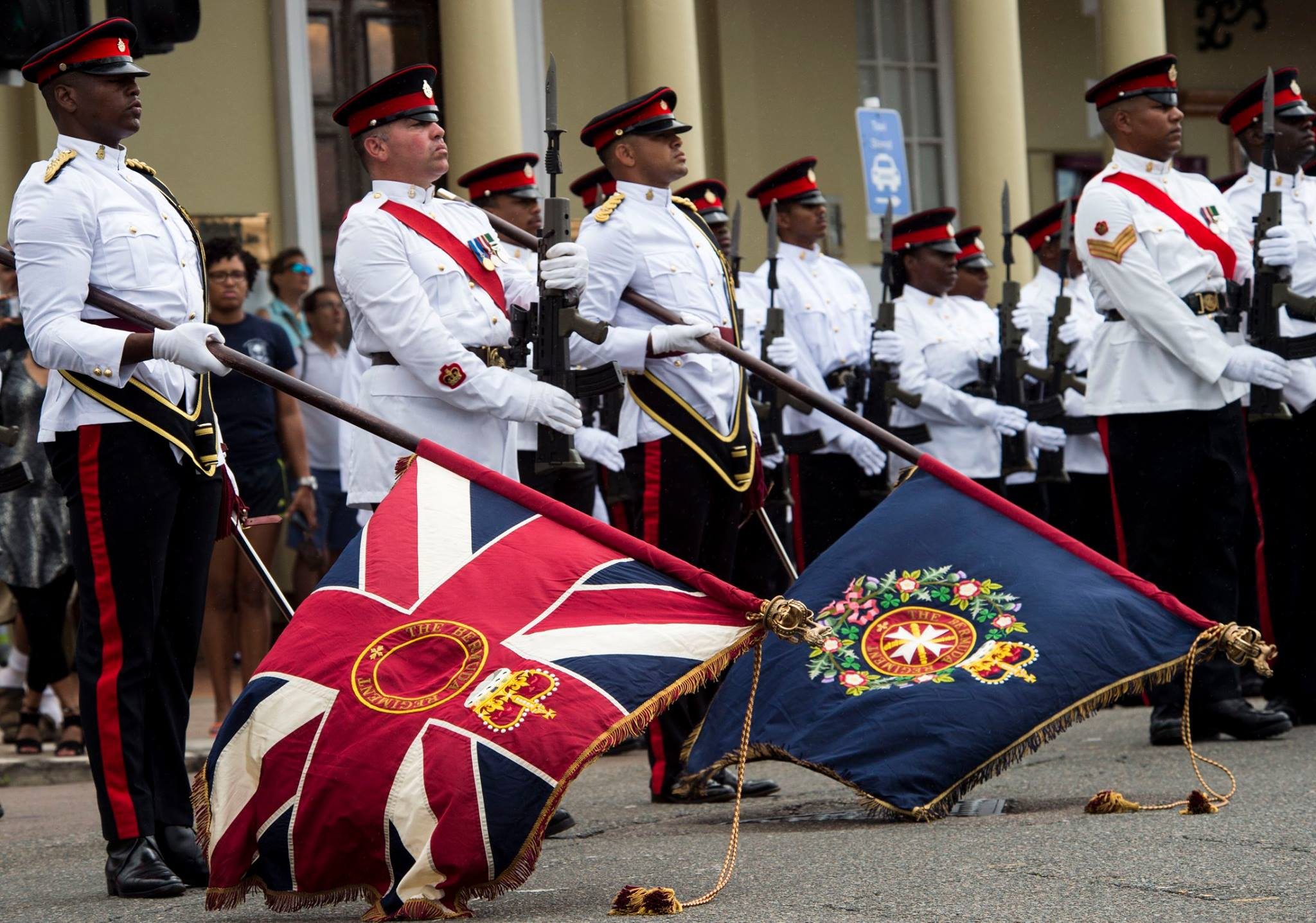
Colour party of the Royal Bermuda Regiment at Queen's Birthday Parade on 10 June 2017

With the end of conscription, it is no longer possible to maintain a dedicated Training Company in which recruits spend their first year. Recruits now spend three months, after their two-week initial training, being trained under Training Wing before being posted to one of the Companies. The current (2026) establishment is:

- Regimental Headquarters
- HQ Company
- A Company
- Logistics Company
- Training Wing
- Coast Guard

One of the units amalgamated into the Royal Bermuda Regiment, the BMA, was nominally an artillery unit, although it had converted to the infantry role in 1953. Other than a ceremonial Gun Troop, equipped with two 25-pdr. field guns, the Royal Bermuda Regiment is wholly an infantry unit.

=== Conscription ===
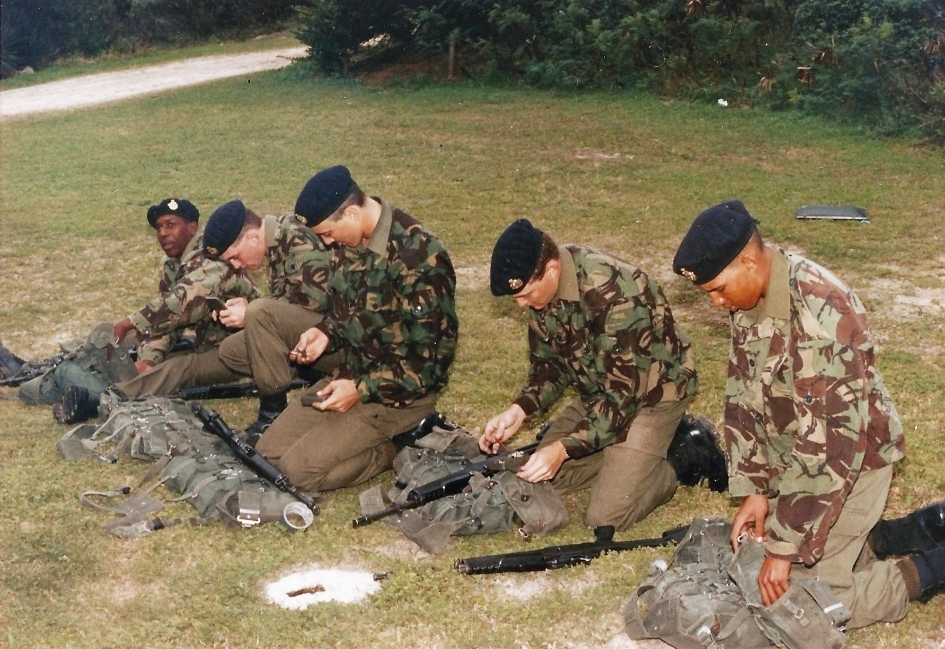
Recruits clean their Mini-14 rifles, prior to a shoot at Warwick Camp, during the 1994 Recruit Camp.

Although its predecessors had been organised and recruited along Territorial Army lines (engaging volunteers for part-time service who were able to be embodied for full-time service in the event of war or other emergency) from the 1920s (1921 for the Bermuda Volunteer Rifle Corps, and 1928 for the Bermuda Militia Artillery) to the 1950s (1957 for the Bermuda Rifles and 1960 for the Bermuda Militia Artillery), excepting during the Second World War (when general conscription of military aged males for the duration of the war was introduced), low recruitment led to conscription by ballot being introduced in the 1950s to make up any shortfall in volunteers (the Defence Act, 1949, had included the machinery for conscription, should it prove necessary, requiring all British males between the ages of 18 and 25 who were resident in Bermuda to register for conscription), and this continued with the Bermuda Regiment after 1965. Although any legally resident Commonwealth national might volunteer, only British nationals resident in Bermuda were liable for conscription (later further limited to those British nationals resident in Bermuda who held Bermudian status, as per the Defence Act, 1965, Section 12, amended by 1997:37 effective 6 May 1999; and by 1998:32 effective 13 July 1998). As per the "Bermuda Report" for 1965 and 1966:

All local male British Subjects between 18 and 25 years of age are required to register for military training. The Act provides machinery for conscription to supplement the voluntary enlistments and so maintain the strength of the unit.

As young men wishing to avoid conscription could be expected to avoid registration for conscription, the ballot actually relied upon the colony's birth register, resulting in occasional conscription of the deceased, or of young men who had been born in Bermuda to foreign parents and who therefore did not have British nationality or Bermudian status, and were not liable for conscription.

The mechanism of conscription used by the Bermuda Regiment was similar to the system that had applied for the Militia in the British Isles (or "Home" Militia) from the 1850s under the Militia Act 1852, although resort to the ballot was not made before the Home Militia was replaced in 1908 with the Special Reserve. Except where specially provided for by the separate Regulations of the Bermuda Militia Artillery, the Regulations of the Home Militia Artillery applied to the Bermuda Militia Artillery, also, when it was raised in 1895. The majority of the Bermuda Regiment was made up of conscripts up to July 2018, making it unique among all of the land forces under the British Crown.

Conscription was based on a random lottery of men through the ages of 18 to 23, with exemptions granted to Police and Prison officers, members of the British regular forces (or men who have served for two years), church ministers, prisoners or those judged to be of "unsound mind".

Both Bermudians and non-Bermudians criticised conscription for its alleged sexism and similarity to slavery (a sensitive issue given the historic background of Bermuda), and this has been noted in the British Parliament.

At its height, three-quarters of the strength of the Bermuda Regiment was made up of conscripts, although many soldiers, whether they initially volunteered or were conscripted, elected to re-engage annually after their initial three years and two months term of service was completed, with some serving for decades (such as WO2 Bernard Pitman, who retired in 2013 after forty years of service).

In 2018, the House of Assembly of Bermuda voted to abolish conscription under the Defence Amendment Act, 2018, effective of 1 July 2018.

=== Recent assessments ===
Towards the end of 2005, the regiment took part in a fitness for role exercise, this time in the form of an inspection by the Ministry of Defence. The review noted that equipment was substandard and major items would be deemed to be unserviceable by 2010 (half of the vehicles and signal equipment were noted to be "out of action") and that command and control was poor, though it also noted high morale and firearms proficiency.

=== Royal Bermuda Regiment Junior Leaders and the Bermuda Cadet Corps ===
The Bermuda Regiment operated its own Junior Leaders programme for many years, starting with nineteen boys who passed out at Warwick Camp on 19 December 1969, thereafter forming the Junior Leaders Company.

In 2012, due to financial constraints, the Bermuda Cadet Corps was disbanded and replaced by the resurrected Bermuda Regiment Junior Leaders. Many of the Bermuda Regiment's officers, warrant officers and NCOs began their service in the Junior Leaders, including former Commanding Officer, Lieutenant-Colonel Brian Gonsalves.

A bill was tabled in the House of Assembly of Bermuda in 2015 to formalise the organisation of the Royal Bermuda Regiment's Junior Leaders.

== Operations ==
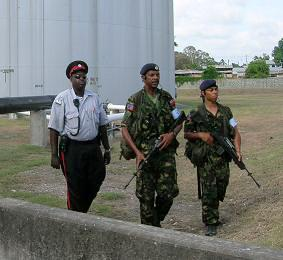
Bermuda Regiment soldiers armed with Mini-14s and a Barbados Police officer conduct a joint patrol of an oil facility during the 2007 Cricket World Cup in Bridgetown, Barbados

The primary role of the regiment has recently become disaster relief. Other roles include ceremonial duties, and supporting the Bermuda police department in internal security issues (both in the forms of riot-control and anti-terrorism). In 2001, following the September 11 attacks on the nearby United States, the Bermuda Regiment was deployed, taking over responsibility for the security of the Bermuda International Airport (Bermuda has always been a point of importance in trans-Atlantic aviation, and a large number of aircraft diverted to the Island when US airspace was closed) and other potential targets. In 2004 and 2005 the regiment deployed to the Cayman Islands and Grenada to assist in post Hurricane Ivan restoration efforts.

The Bermuda Regiment successfully deployed a platoon of internal security trained soldiers to Barbados in 2007. There they took part in forming the security infrastructure for the WCC Cricket World Cup. They worked alongside soldiers from Barbados, Guyana, India and South Africa, in ensuring a secure environment for the Super 8 series of matches.

The Bermuda Regiment also provided a cordon at the Bermuda International Airport in October, 1996, when the Chinese ship, Xing Da, was brought to the island. The ship had been detained on the Atlantic by the United States Coast Guard carrying over a hundred illegal migrants with the intent of smuggling them into Massachusetts. It was intended to transfer the passengers and crew to Guantanamo Bay Naval Base, but the ship was deemed unseaworthy. Taking the ship into a US port to transfer the detainees to Cuba was undesirable as the US Government would have then been obliged to allow any who requested to enter the process for asylum application. The only other port within reach was Bermuda, roughly 640 miles from North Carolina and 1,061.4 miles from Guantanamo Bay. As the UK Government was wary of allowing the detainees to set foot on British territory for the same reason, the ship was kept offshore while the two governments negotiated. A Company of the Bermuda Regiment was deployed, pending the outcome. On 9 October, it provided a cordon to close off the Weapons Pier of the former United States Navy NAS Bermuda, while Bermuda Government ferry boats brought the detainees into Castle Harbour. Bermuda Police and US Coast Guard powerboats transferred the detainees to the Weapons Pier, where they were handcuffed and loaded, one-by-one, aboard waiting US Coast Guard C-130 Hercules, with each aeroplane taking off and heading for Cuba as soon as it was full.

== Overseas connections ==
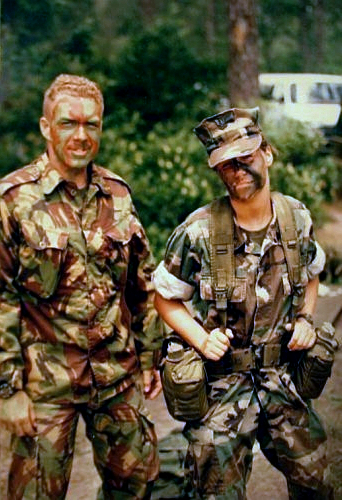
Royal Bermuda Regiment and US Navy NAS Bermuda personnel at Camp Lejeune.

During the First World War, the Bermuda Regiment's predecessor, the Bermuda Volunteer Rifle Corps (BVRC) sent two contingents to serve with the Lincolnshire Regiment on the Western Front. After the War, the connection to the Lincolns was made official. The BVRC again provided two drafts to the Lincolns during the Second World War. When the BVRC (renamed the Bermuda Rifles) was amalgamated in 1965 with the Bermuda Militia Artillery (BMA), to create the Bermuda Regiment, the Royal Anglian Regiment, into which the (Royal) Lincolnshire Regiment had itself been amalgamated, continued the paternal role. In light of the Royal Bermuda Regiment's Royal Artillery roots, an unofficial affiliation was begun in 1997 with the 104 Regiment, Royal Artillery (The Welsh & Borderer Gunners).

=== Corps Warrant ===
In late 2001, the Bermuda Regiment and the Royal Gibraltar Regiment were presented with Corps Warrants dated 21 February 2000.

In 2017, the Corps Warrant ceased on 30 July. A new Corps Warrant which included the Royal Bermuda Regiment was confirmed as a Corps of the British Army and took effect 1 August 2017 and was signed at St. James Court by Her Majesty's Command dated 17 July 2017.

The 2017 Corp Warrant notes that the competition of Corps composition 'The under mentioned bodies of the [British] Army comprising Regular Forces, Army Reserves, Regular Reserve, including any raised hereafter and any local units overseas: of which the Royal Bermuda Regiment was listed with the composition note; All units and personnel of The Royal Bermuda Regiment.'

=== Other ===
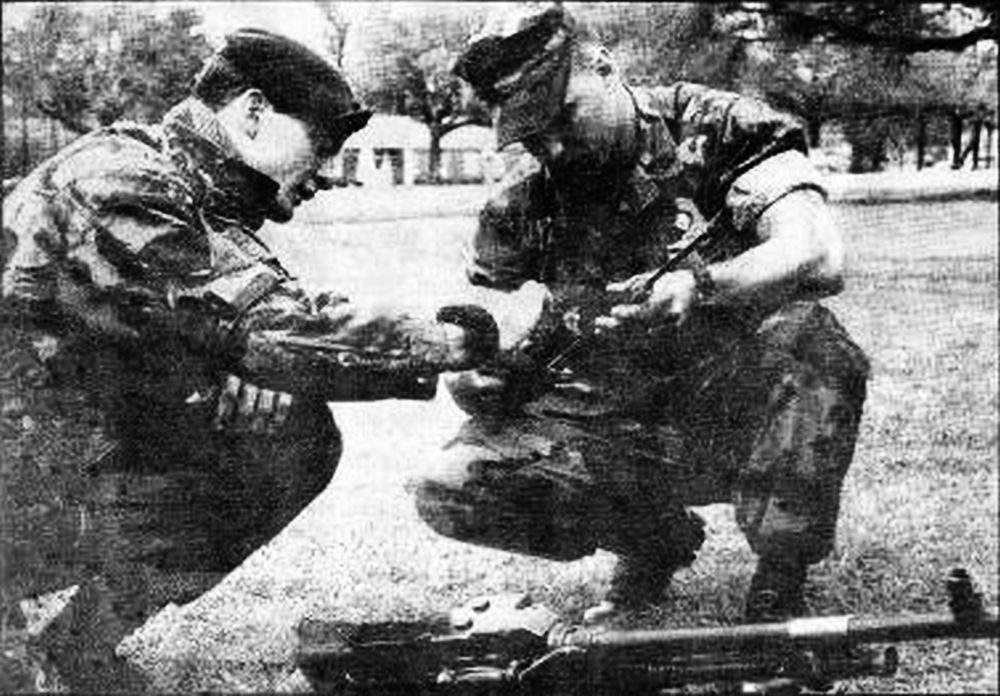
Royal Bermuda Regiment and US Marine Corps Sergeants, 1989

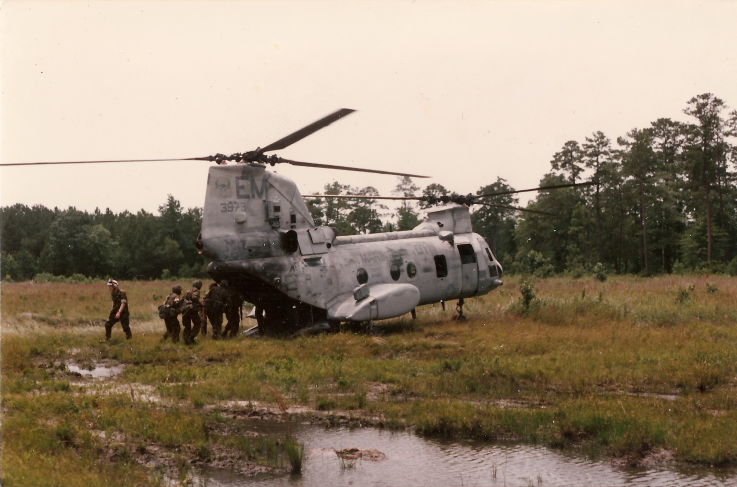
Bermuda Regiment soldiers board a USMC CH-46 Sea Knight at USMC Camp Lejeune, in North Carolina, United States.

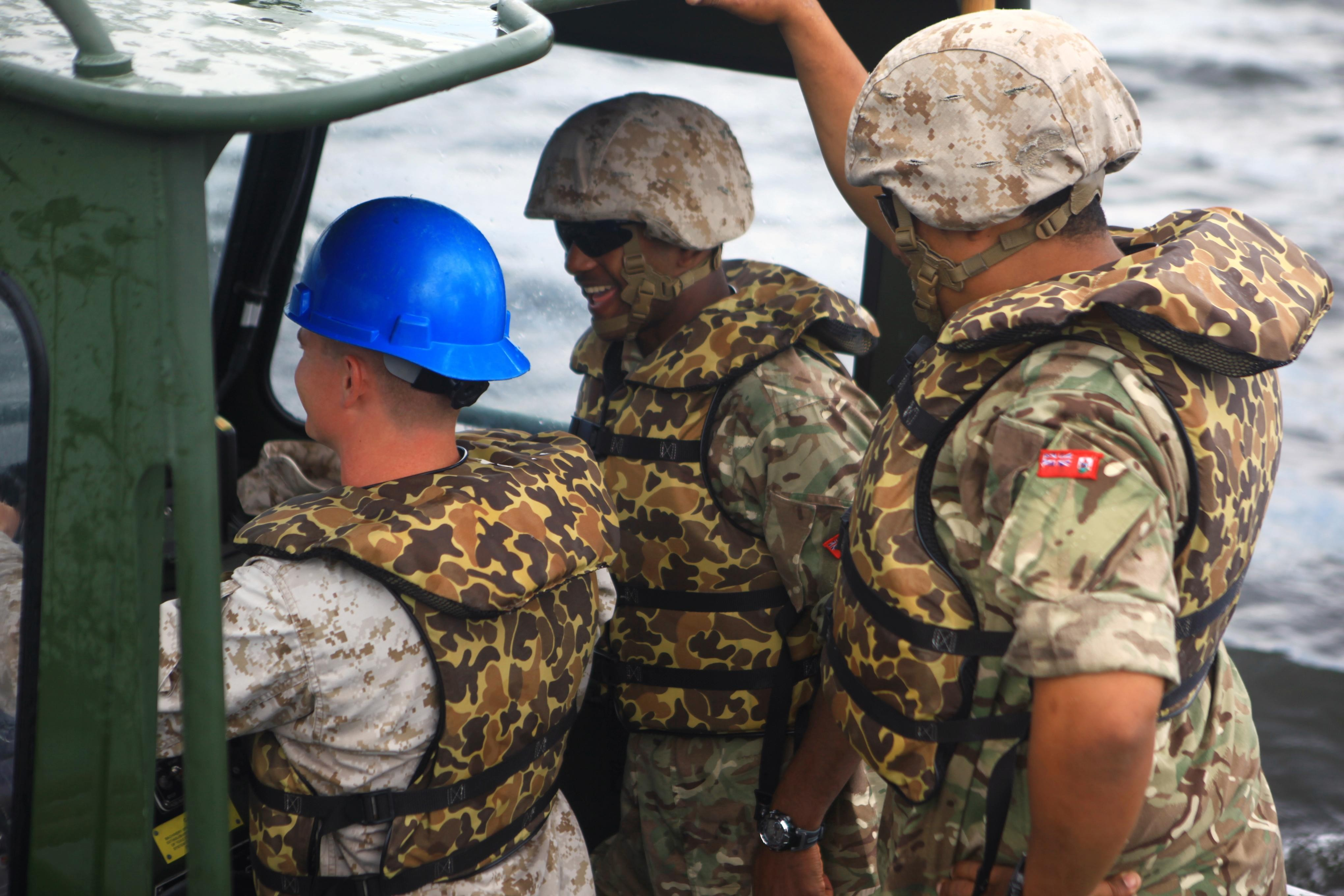
Two soldiers from the Bermuda Regiment's Guns/Assault Pioneers with a US Marine Corps engineer at Camp Lejeune in 2013

The Bermuda Regiment also developed a relationship with the United States Marine Corps, which had supplied a detachment to Bermuda for many years to guard United States Navy facilities. In addition to occasional training with the US Marines in Bermuda, the Bermuda Regiment used facilities and training areas of the US Marines' Camp Lejeune and Camp Geiger in North Carolina for training, with the two rifle companies having been sent there every second year for their annual camps.

The Bermuda Regiment took part in its first exercise overseas in 1968, when twenty-eight personnel were deployed to Jamaica on 26 October, along with "A" Company of the York and Lancaster Regiment, for a four-week introduction to jungle warfare in the vicinity of Berriedale, in Portland. Jamaica became the location of annual camps in alternate years, but in March, 2013, it was announced that a new location would be sought. This was due to the cost of deploying to Jamaica (a flight of 1,249 miles, compared to 725 miles for the flight to MCAS Cherry Point, North Carolina), given the budgetary constraints, and as Jamaica provided little opportunity for training in Internal Security roles, such as is available at USMCB Camp Lejeune with its Military Operations in Urban Terrain (MOUT) facility. In 2014, the annual camp was held at the Land Force Central Area Training Centre Meaford of the Canadian Army at Meaford, in Ontario, Canada.

The Bermuda Regiment's training in the US, Jamaica and Canada is self-contained, rarely involving local units, but friendly relationships have been developed with both the US Marine Corps, and the Jamaica Defence Force (JDF). Specialist Bermuda Regiment sub-units, such as the Reconnaissance Platoon and the Medics, have trained with equivalent US Marine Corps units at Camp Lejeune.

Over the last decade, a relationship has also been developed with the Royal Gibraltar Regiment, and small detachments sent with that regiment on its annual training deployments to Morocco. In 2007, for the first time, the annual camp was held in England, with detachments training at the Cinque Ports Training Area (CPTA); part of the Defence Training Estate (DTE) South-East, near Dover.

As the new Cayman Islands Regiment is being developed, the Royal Bermuda Regiment has been tasked to train the first few batches of recruits from the Cayman Islands at Warwick Camp. The first batch of Caymanian recruits had joined the February 2020 intake of Bermudian recruits.

== Alliances ==
- United Kingdom – The Royal Anglian Regiment
- Canada – The Lincoln and Welland Regiment
- Jamaica – The Jamaica Defence Force

== Commanding officers ==
The commanding officer of the Bermuda Regiment (as also the quartermaster, training officer, the staff officer (UK Loan Service), the adjutant, the aide-de-camp, and the regimental sergeant major) is a full-time position, requiring those appointed to the role to take leave of their civilian employments. On the amalgamation of the Bermuda Militia Artillery and Bermuda Rifles in 1965, Lieutenant-Commander John Brownlow Tucker, previously designated the Officer Commanding Bermuda Local Forces, became Commanding Officer of the new Bermuda Regiment (he had previously served in the Bermuda Volunteer Rifle Corps, as a company commander in the Lincolnshire Regiment during the Second World War, and in the Bermuda Militia Artillery). Originally, there was a four-year limit to the term of a commanding officer, which could be extended if required. Following Lieutenant-Colonel Gavin A. Shorto's six years in the office, a three-year appointment was made the norm. The commanding officer is normally chosen from among the majors of the Battalion, and is promoted to lieutenant-colonel. Following the death of Major Christian Wheddon in a motor accident in England in 2012, while training in preparation for assuming command, Lieutenant-Colonel Michael Foster-Brown, a professional soldier from The Rifles, assumed command in June 2013, the first non-Bermudian to fill the role. Lieutenant-Colonel Benjamin Beasley, who had previously held a commission in the Royal Air Force, was succeeded by Lieutenant-Colonel Duncan E. R. Simons in 2024. Second-in-Command is Major Thomas Wood (who had previously served in the regular army).

== Equipment ==
Royal Bermuda Regiment soldiers armed with the L85A2 rifle conduct Military Operations on Urban Terrain (MOUT) training at US Marine Corps Base Camp Lejeune in 2021

The BMA and Bermuda Rifles had re-equipped from the .303 inch No. 4, Mk. 1 rifle to the 7.62mm NATO L1A1 Self-Loading Rifle (SLR) the year before amalgamation. The .303 inch Bren light machine gun and Vickers machine gun were replaced by the 7.62mm NATO General Purpose Machine Gun (GPMG) in 1967. The Bermuda Regiment inherited the SLR and the GPMG from its predecessors. For Internal Security use, the Federal Riot Gun being used in Northern Ireland for firing baton rounds and gas canisters was also adopted. The Bermudian reserve forces had been equipped with standard British Army weapons since their restoration in 1895 (the Sten sub-machine gun had been replaced in the 1960s with the Sterling submachine gun, but this had then been replaced with the Israeli Uzi).

During the 1950s, the British forces had been pressured into dropping the .280 British sub-calibre round and EM-2 rifle that had been intended to replace respectively .303 inch ammunition and the No. 4 rifle, adopting instead the American 7.62mm ammunition as NATO standard and the SLR, which was a variant of the Belgian FN FAL. Despite forcing the adoption of the 7.62mm round by NATO, the US re-equipped during the Vietnam War with the M16 rifle, chambered for the 5.56×45mm M193 sub-calibre ammunition. Dissatisfaction with the 7.62mm round led NATO to seek a replacement during the 1970s, and the Belgian SS109 variant of the American M193 was adopted as 5.56mm NATO in 1980.

The Royal Small Arms Factory at Enfield had already begun work in 1969 on a new bull-pup design, based on the Armalite AR-18 and chambered for a new 4.85×49mm sub-calibre. This was a family of weapons to include the Enfield Individual Weapon to replace the SLR, the longer-barrelled Light Support Weapon to replace the 7.62mm Bren and the General Purpose Machine Gun in the light role, and a short-barrelled variant to replace the Sterling submachine gun. With the standardisation of 5.56mm NATO in 1980, this design was rechambered for it and designated "Small Arms for the 1980s" (SA80). The development of SA80 was drawn out by various issues. It would finally be adopted as the L85A1 rifle and L86A2 Light Support Weapon and begin to be issued in 1985, although Territorial Army units would not begin receiving it until 1991. Had the Ministry of Defence made the L85A1 available to re-arm the Bermuda Regiment, it would therefore have been unlikely to receive them until the latter 1990s. Although it would acquire a pair of L85A1 rifles for familiarisation training, the Bermuda Regiment decided not to wait for the SA80 and replaced the SLR with the American-made Ruger Mini-14 GB self-loading (in American parlance, "semi automatic") rifle in 1983. The GPMG was retained in the light-, as well as the medium-, machine gun role. The Ruger has a 20-round detachable box magazine and can be fitted with a US M7 bayonet. The original wooden stocks were replaced with Choate black plastic stocks by 1992 and no further modifications have been made since.

A replacement for the aging Rugers was sought at the end of the Century, with small numbers of the German Heckler & Koch G36 and the American Colt M4 (a carbine variant of the M16) obtained for trials, following which the G36 had been selected as a replacement for the Ruger and the Uzi sub-machine gun. However, budgetary issues delayed the acquisition of the G36, which also became surrounded by controversy in Germany over reported inaccuracy in warm temperatures. The Ruger Mini-14 was finally replaced by the L85A2 variant of the SA80, which was received in August, 2015, and phased out of use by January, 2016.

=== Rifles ===
Name	Origin	Type	Cartridge	Image	Details
L85A2 / SA-80	United Kingdom	Assault Rifle	5.56×45mm NATO		Adopted as the Standard issue to riflemen as of January 2016.
Heckler & Koch G36	Germany	Assault Rifle	5.56×45mm NATO		Adopted as second-tier weapon, issued to specialist companies i.e. Boat Troop and OSU.
L42A1	United Kingdom	Bolt action sniper rifle	7.62×51mm NATO		Adopted as Sniper rifle, a 7.62mm variant of the Lee–Enfield No. 4
Mossberg 500	United States	shotgun	12 gauge		Adopted as Shotgun.

==== Obsolete and/or held in stocks ====
- (United States) Mini-14GB/20 self-loading rifle with Choate stock (standard issue to riflemen from 1983 to January 2016)
- (United Kingdom) L1A1 Self-Loading Rifle (standard issue to riflemen from 1965 to 1983, but stocks still held)
- (United States) Colt M4 (stocks obtained for trials to determine replacement for Mini-14 and Uzi)
- (United Kingdom) Greener shotgun (obsolete, but stocks still held)

=== Pistols ===
Name	Origin	Type	Cartridge	Image	Details
Glock 17 L131A1	Austria	Semi-automatic pistol	9×19mm Parabellum		Adopted as the standard-issue sidearm pistol for Regiment Personnel.
Beretta 92	Italy	Semi-automatic pistol	9×19mm Parabellum		Adopted as the issue sidearm pistol for Regiment Personnel.

=== Machine guns ===
Name	Origin	Type	Cartridge	Image	Details
FN MAG L7A2	Belgium	General-purpose machine gun	7.62×51mm NATO		Adopted in 1967 as the standard-issue General-purpose machine gun for use in light role only.

==== Obsolete ====
- (United Kingdom) .303 Bren light machine gun

=== Internal Security (IS) ===
Name	Origin	Type	Cartridge	Image	Details
ARWEN 37	United Kingdom	Less-lethal Riot Launcher	37mm		Adopted as the issued Less-lethal Riot Weapon.

==== Obsolete ====
- (United States) Federal Riot Gun (replaced by the ARWEN 37)

=== Artillery ===
Name	Origin	Type	Cartridge	Image	Details
Ordnance QF 25-Pounder Field Gun	United Kingdom	Field gun	88 x 292mm		
Ordnance SBML 2-inch mortar	United Kingdom	Light mortar	2 in (51 mm)		

=== Vehicles ===
- (Japan) Toyota Land Cruiser J70
- (Japan) Mitsubishi L 300 van
- (United States) Ford 350 Ambulance
- (Japan) UD 2300DH truck
- (Japan) Toyota Dyna truck
- (Japan) Toyota HiAce van
- (Japan) Toyota LiteAce Minivan

=== Boats ===
- (United Kingdom) Dell Quay Dory Mk. 1 boats
- (United Kingdom) 18 foot Rigid Raider boats
- (United Kingdom) Halmatic RHIB boats
- (United States) 41 Juliet (27 foot Boston Whaler Guardian class boat)

=== Radio ===
- (United Kingdom) Sepura SC20, replaced Sepura STP8200 radios
- (United Kingdom) Sepura STP8200, replaced Bendix King radios

== Gallery ==
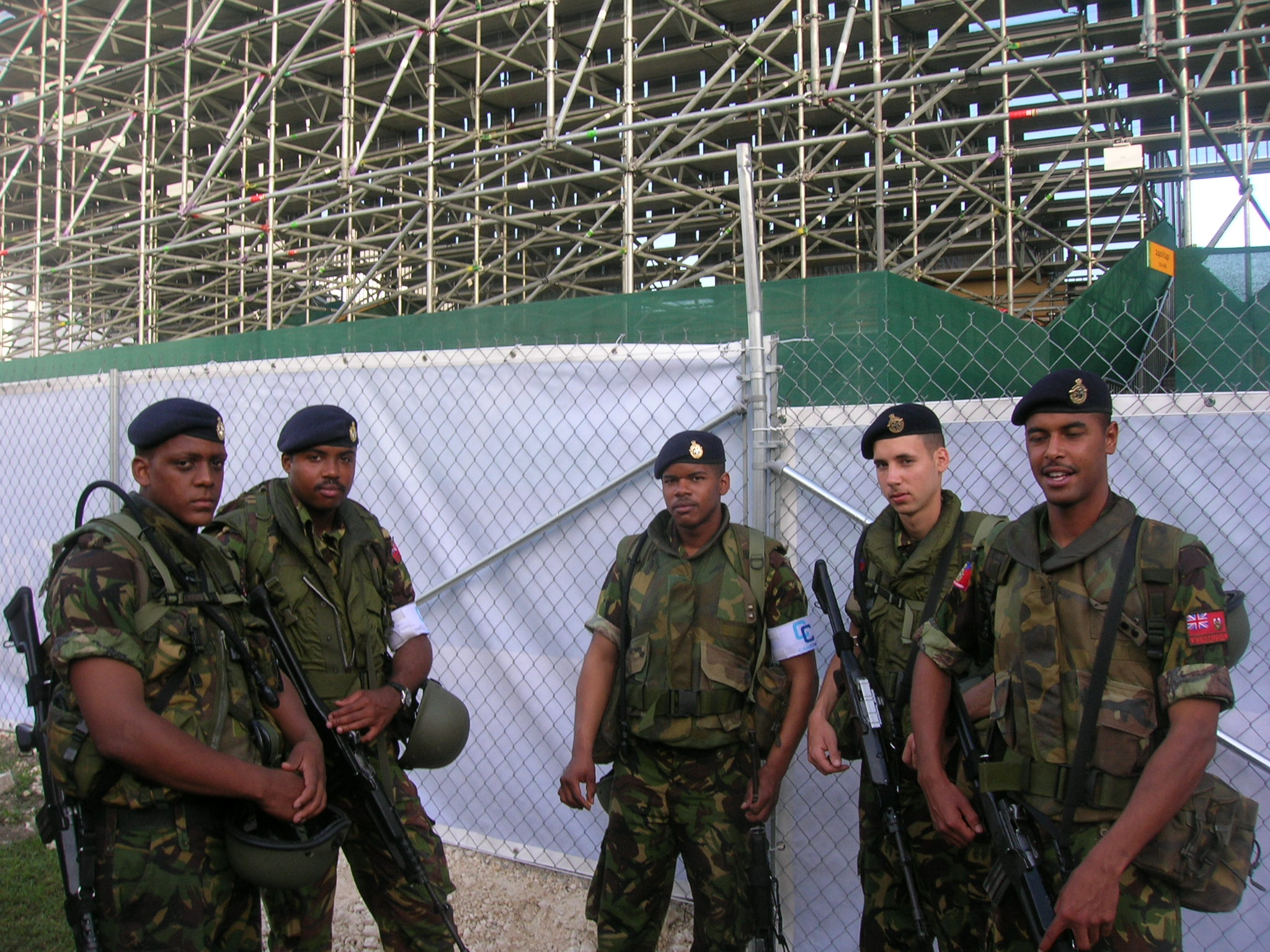
Bermuda Regiment Soldiers armed with Mini-14s on OPs in Barbados for Cricket World Cup 2007

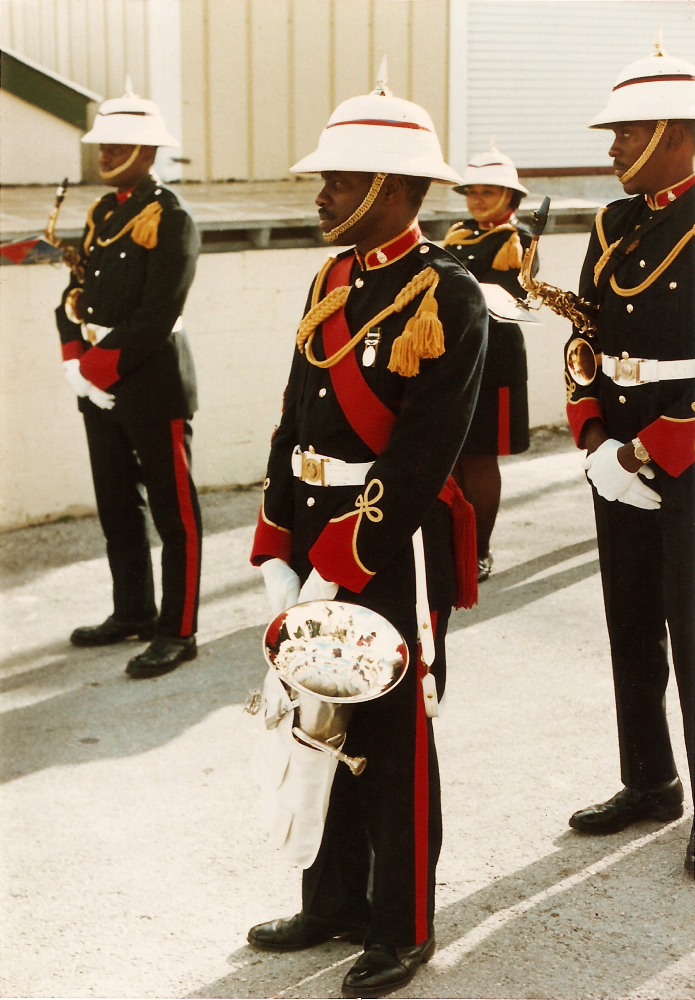
The Royal Bermuda Regiment Band

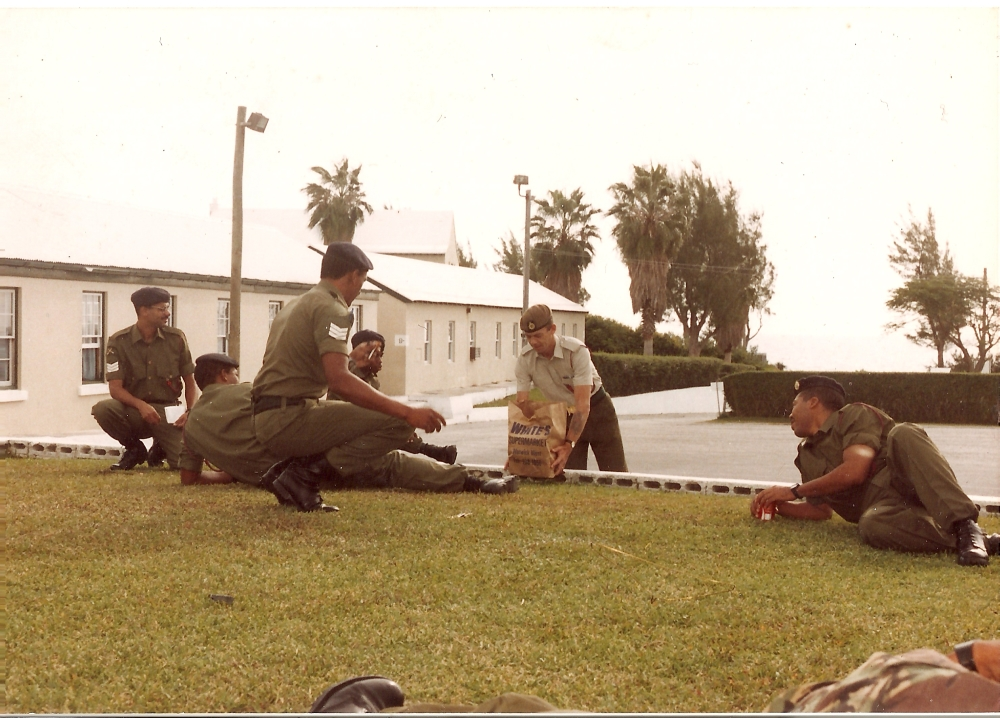
A Permanent Staff Instructor (PSI) with senior Non-Commissioned Officers of the Bermuda Regiment.

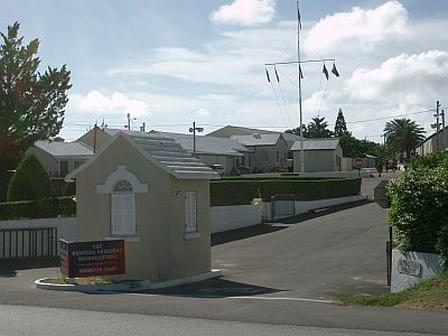
The main gate of Warwick Camp, as it appears today, from the South Shore Road (formerly The Military Road).

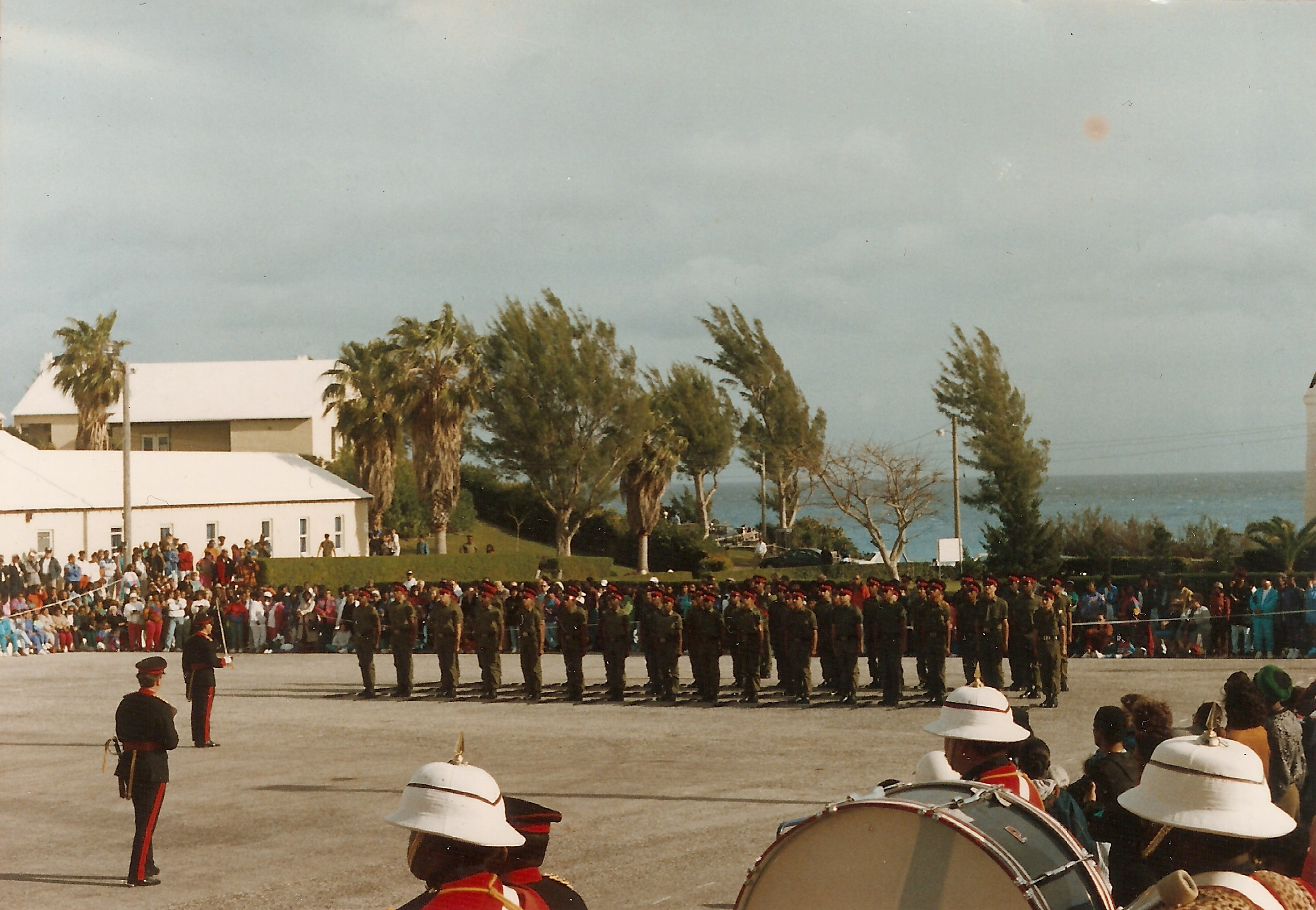
A platoon of the Training Company of the Bermuda Regiment, at Warwick Camp, during Recruit Camp 1993

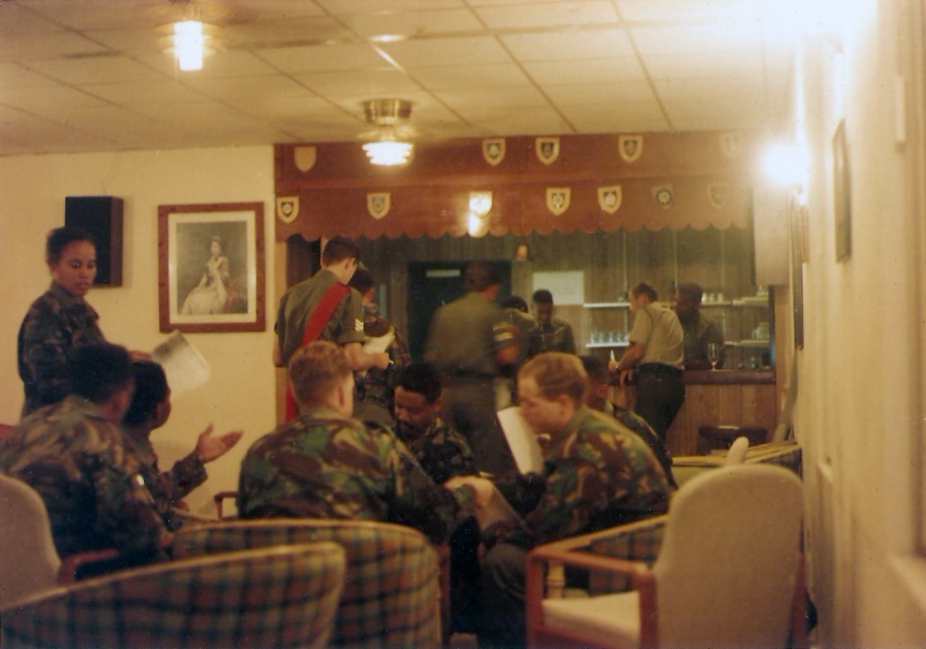
Bermuda Regiment Corporal's Mess at Warwick Camp.

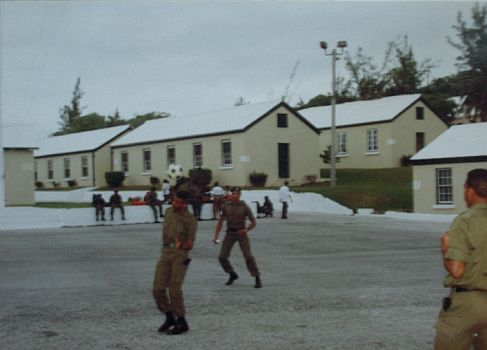
Bermuda Regiment soldiers play football on the parade ground of Warwick Camp.

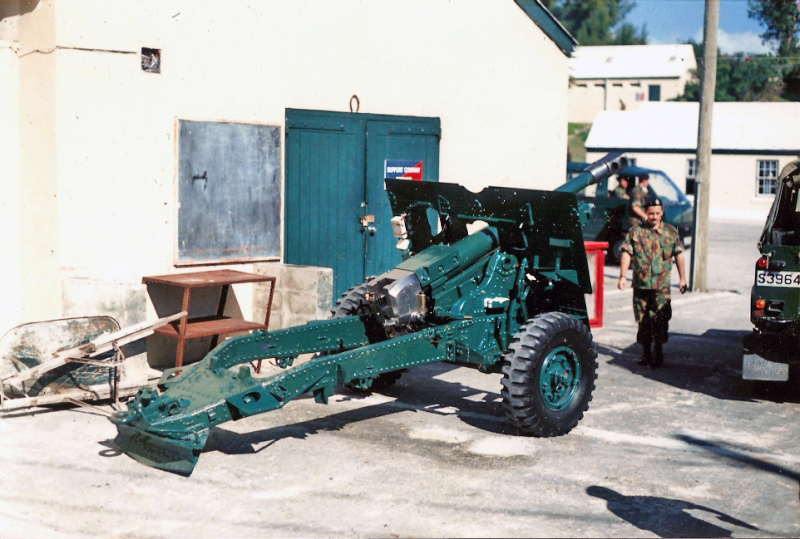
25-Pounder (88 mm) field gun of the Bermuda Regiment's ceremonial Gun Troop.

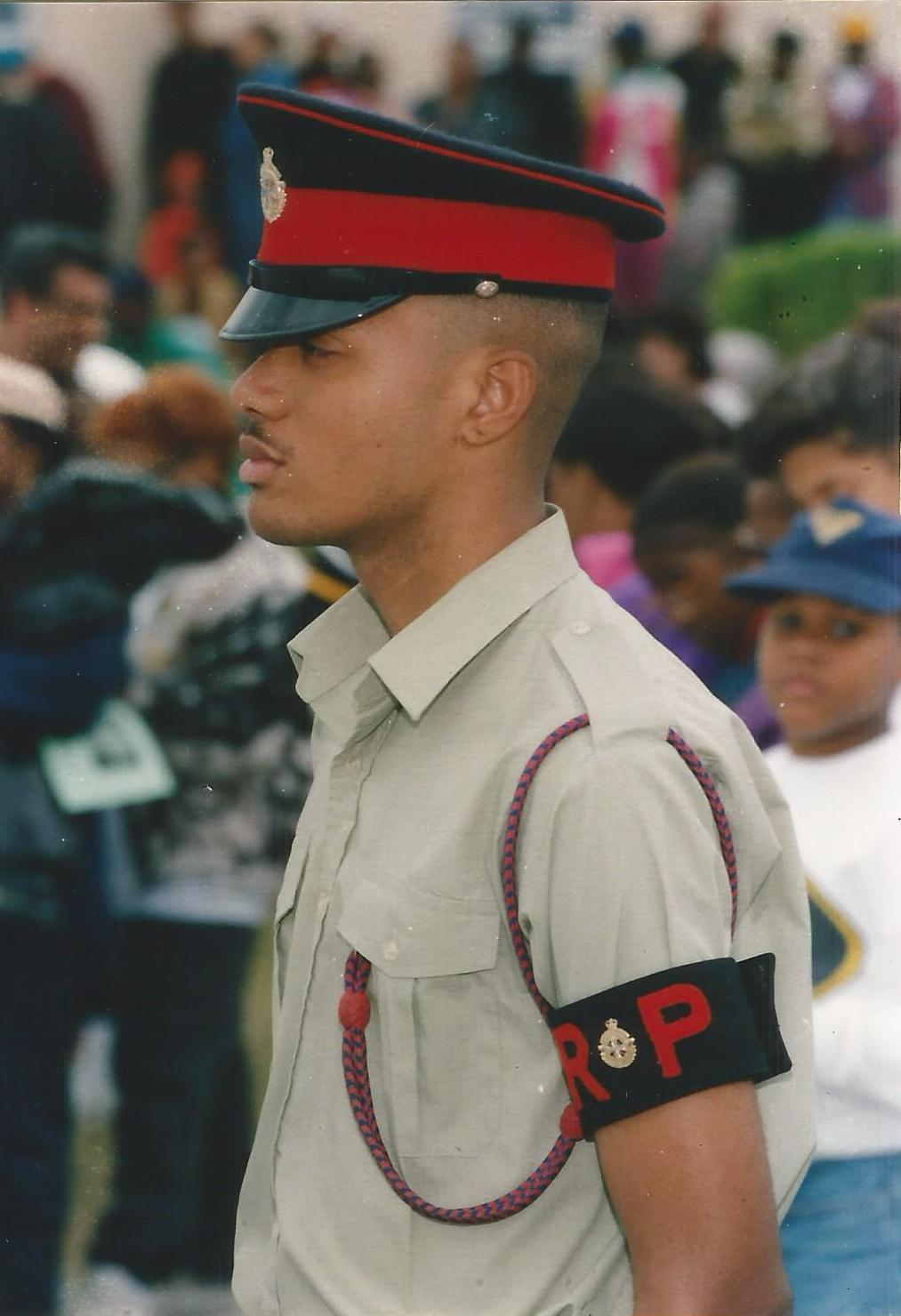
Bermuda Regiment Regimental Policeman in January, 1994

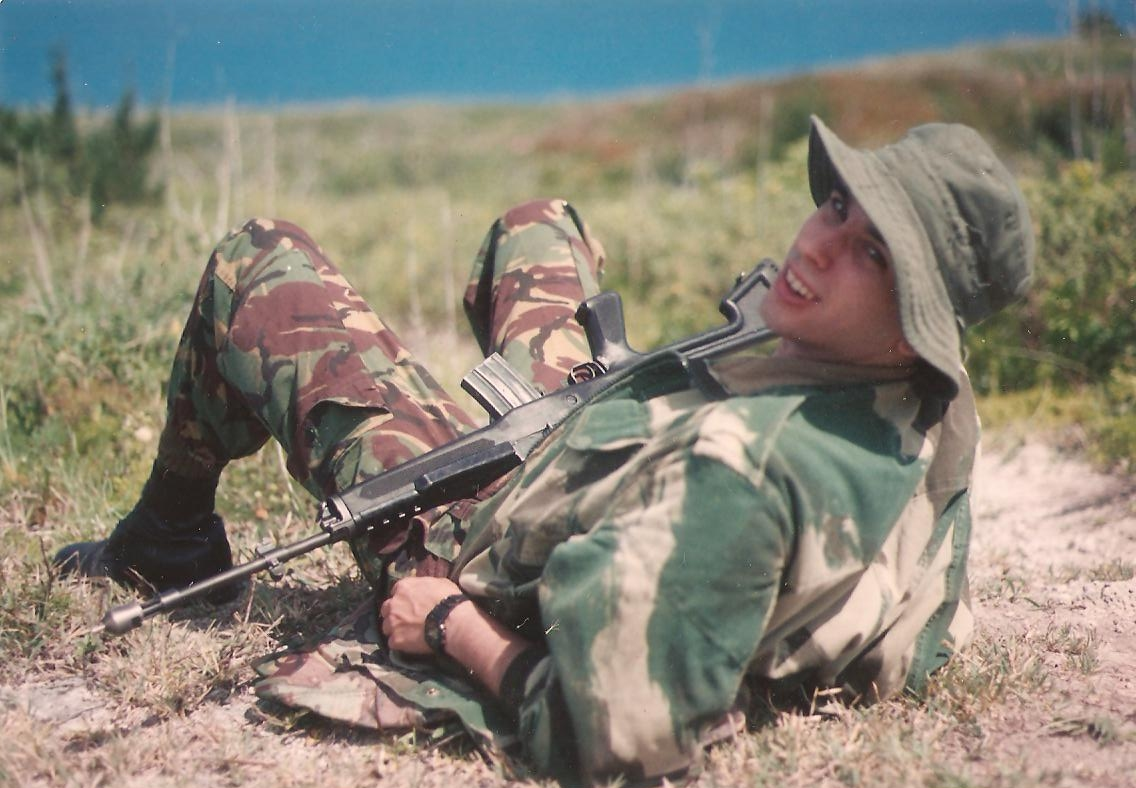
Royal Bermuda Regiment soldier with a Ruger Mini-14 at Ferry Reach in 1994

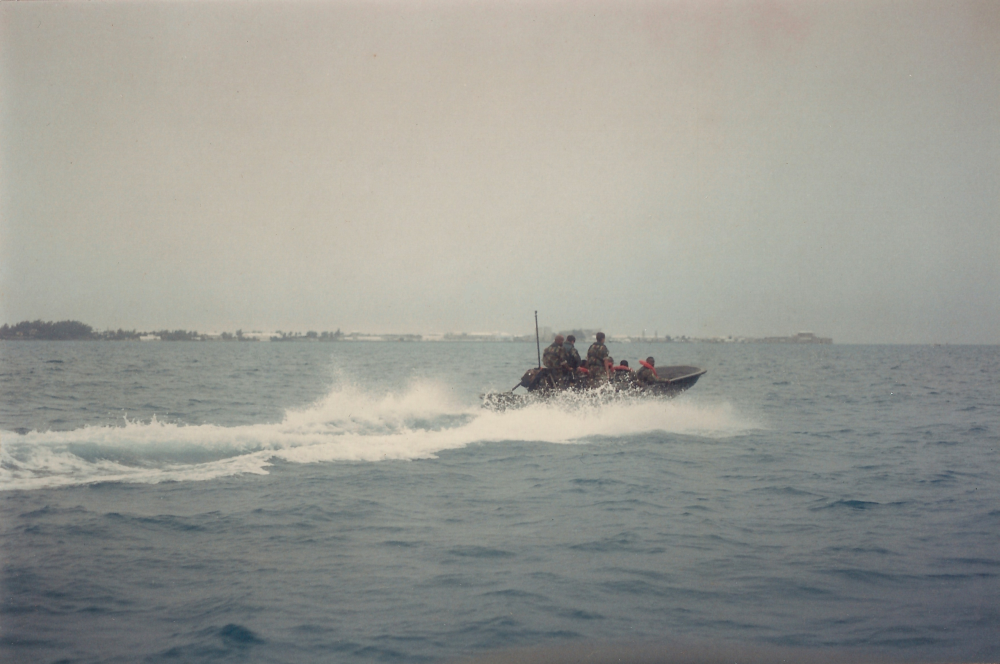
A motorboat of the Bermuda Regiment Boat Troop moves out of the Great Sound, past the HMD, Bermuda, on Ireland Island.

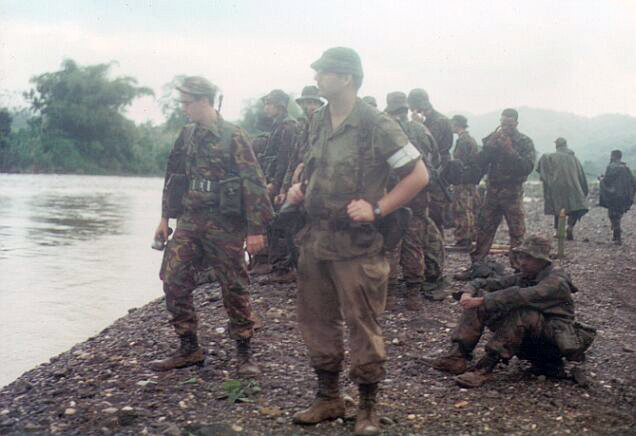
An NCO of The Lincoln and Welland Regiment attached to a rifle company of the affiliated Bermuda Regiment training in Jamaica, 1996.

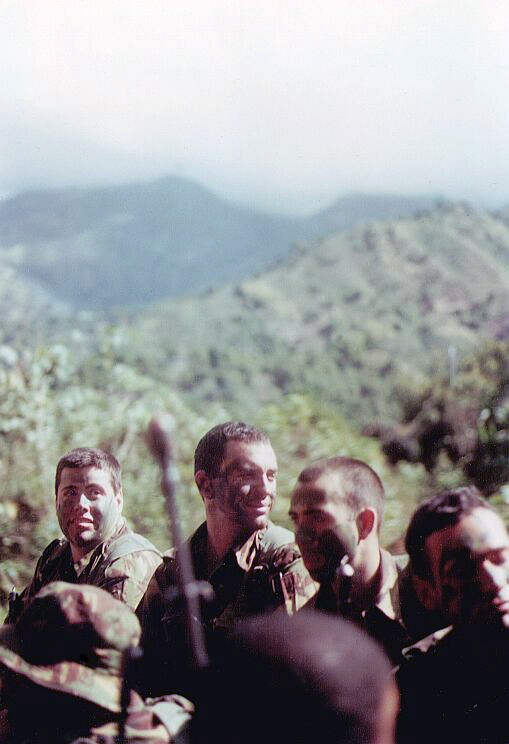
Lieutenant-Colonel (then-Lieutenant) William White in Jamaica, 1996.

Jamaica Defence Force soldier with a sergeant of the Bermuda Regiment in the Blue Mountains of Jamaica.

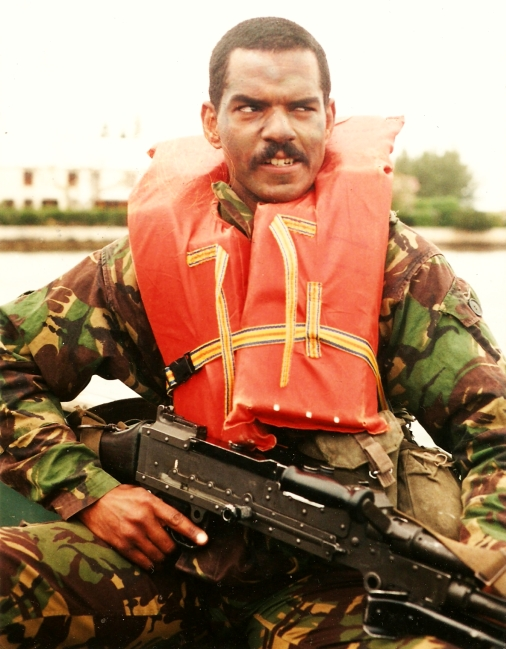
An NCO of the Bermuda Regiment armed with a General Purpose Machine Gun, aboard a Rigid Raider.

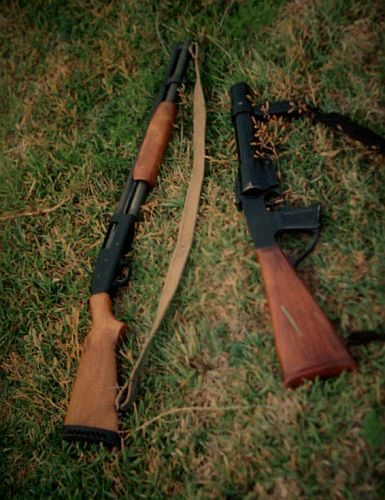
Mossberg 500 shotgun and Federal Riot Gun of the Bermuda Regiment

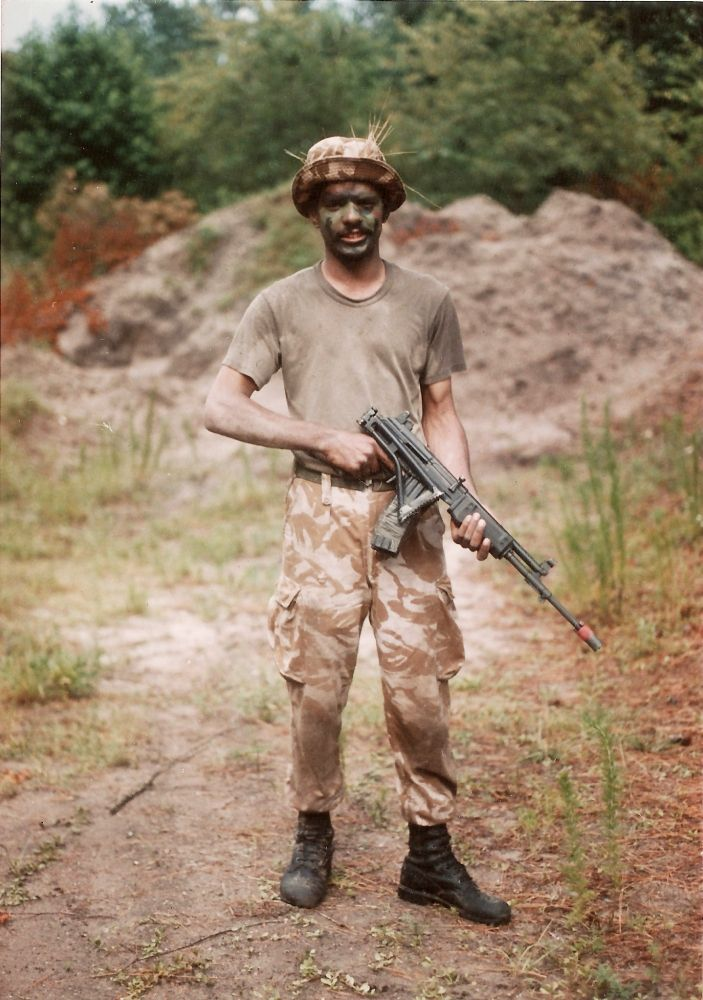
A Bermuda Regiment NCO in No. 5 (Desert Combat) Dress, armed with a Galil AR self-loading rifle at USMC Camp Lejeune in 1994.

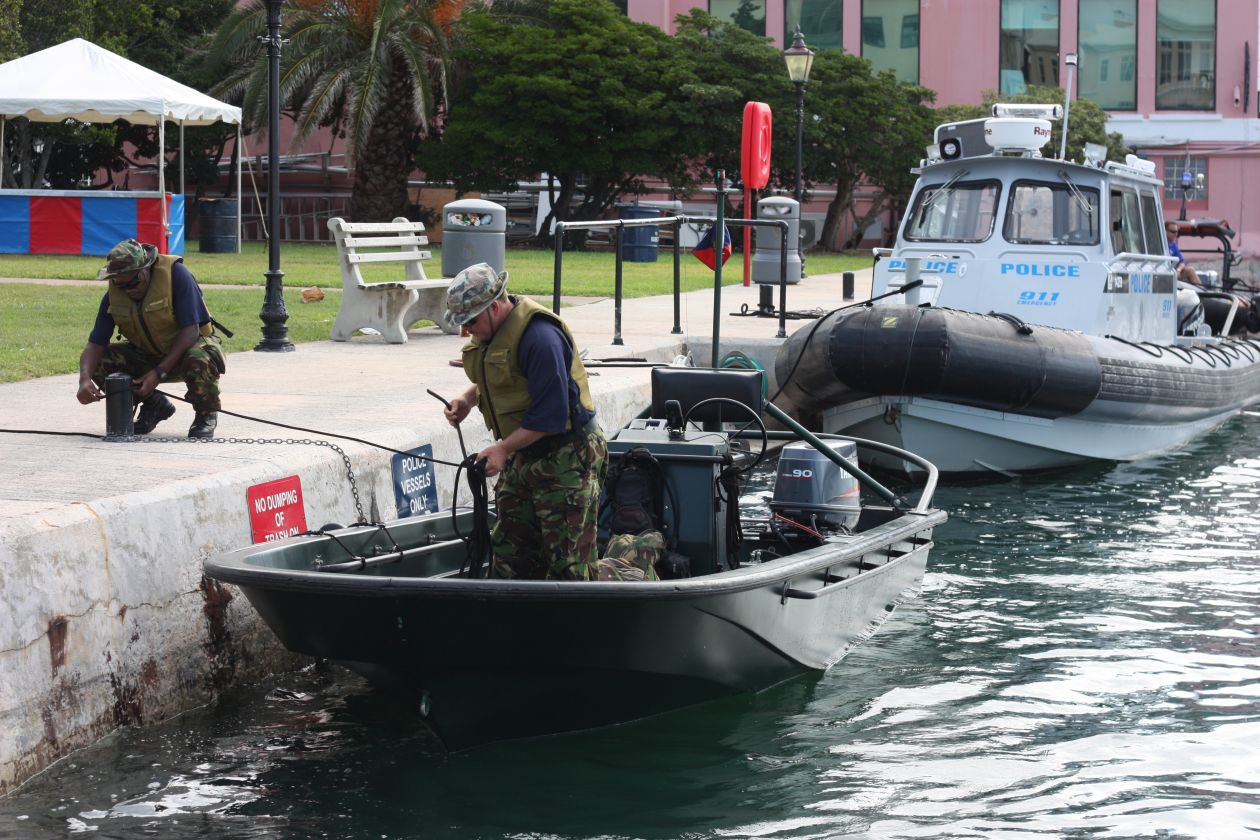
Bermuda Regiment & Bermuda Police Service boats in July 2011

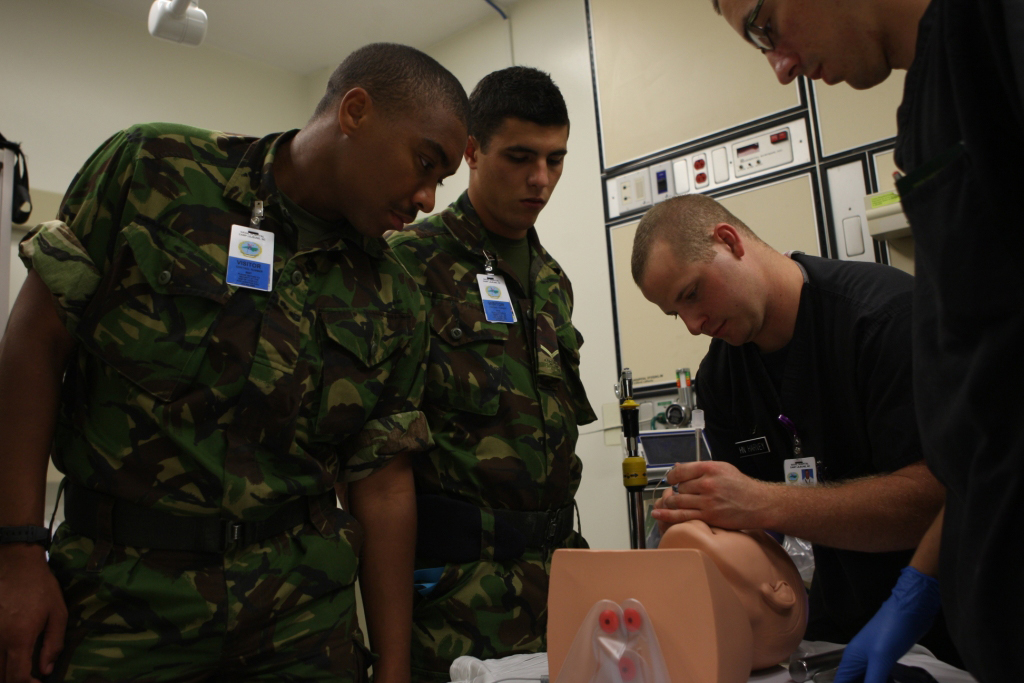
Bermuda Regiment Medics and US Navy Corspmen at USMCB Camp Lejeune in May 2011

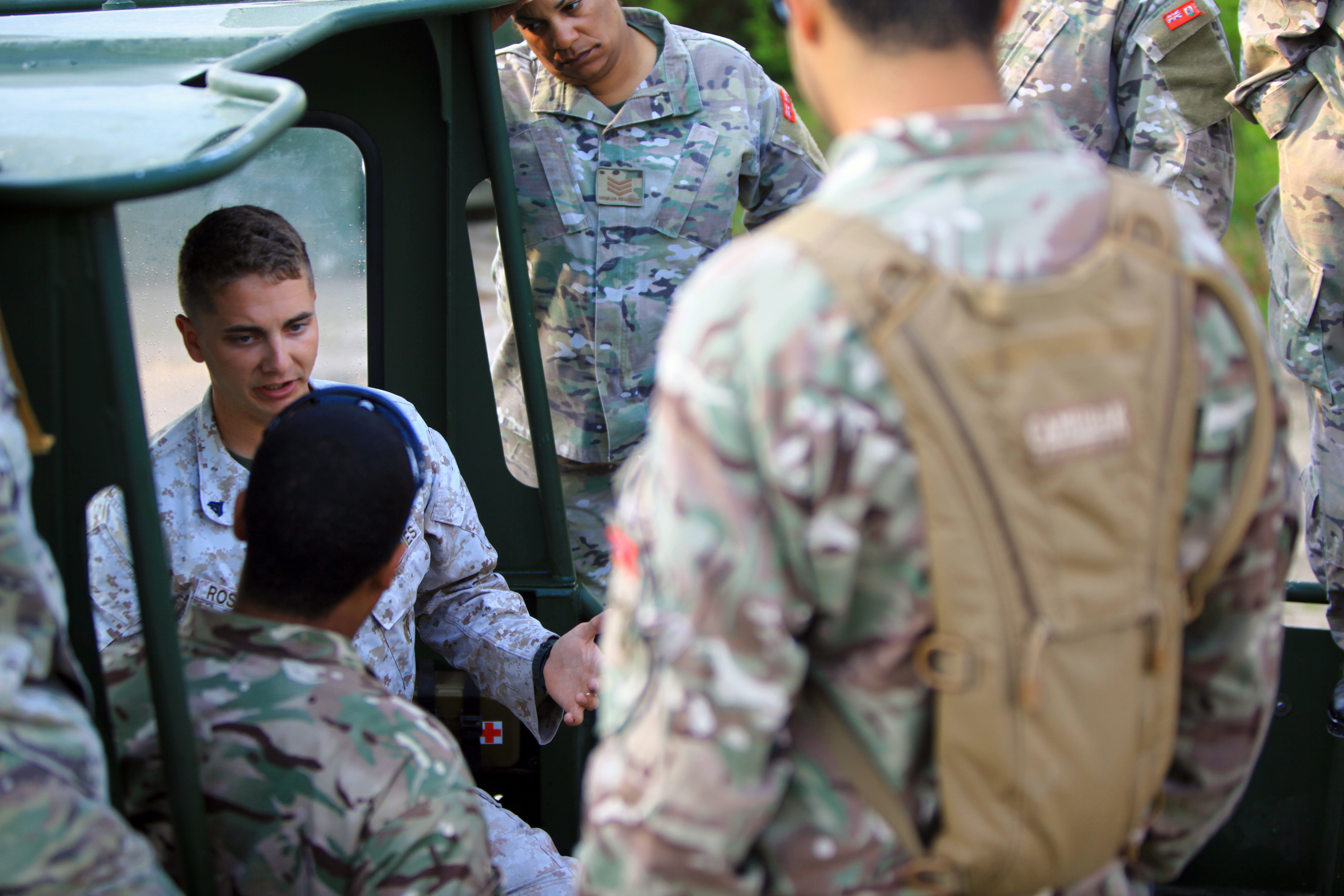
Cpl. Erikon C. Rosamond (left) of the US Marines and Royal Bermuda Regiment soldiers at Camp Lejeune in 2013

Royal Bermuda Regiment Guns and Assault Pioneers Platoon soldiers and a US Marine discuss training at Camp Lejeune in 2013.

Guns and Assault Pioneers Platoon train with a US Marine at US Marine Corps Base Camp Lejeune in 2013

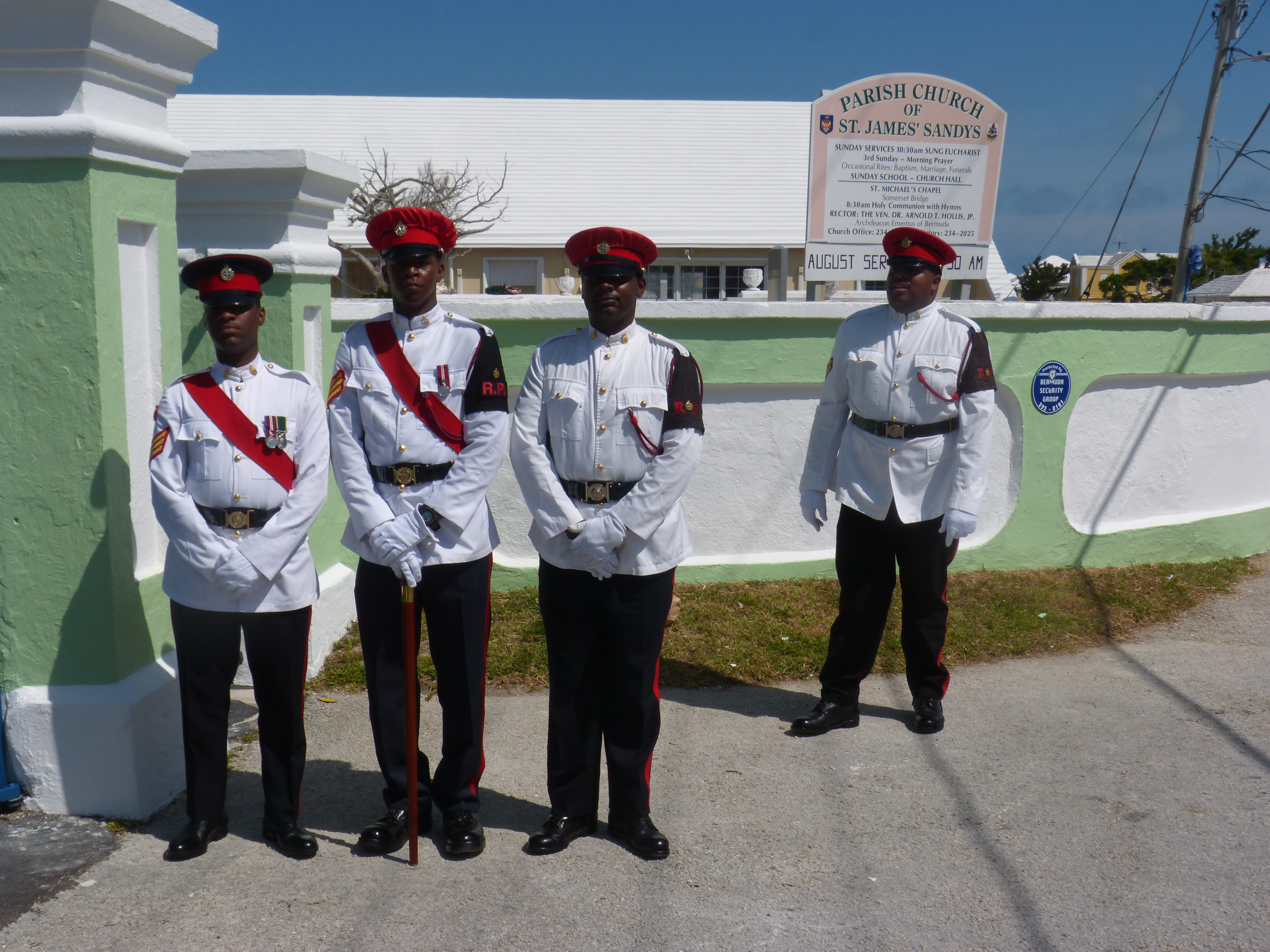
Royal Bermuda Regiment soldiers attend a funeral at St. James' Church in Somerset in August, 2016

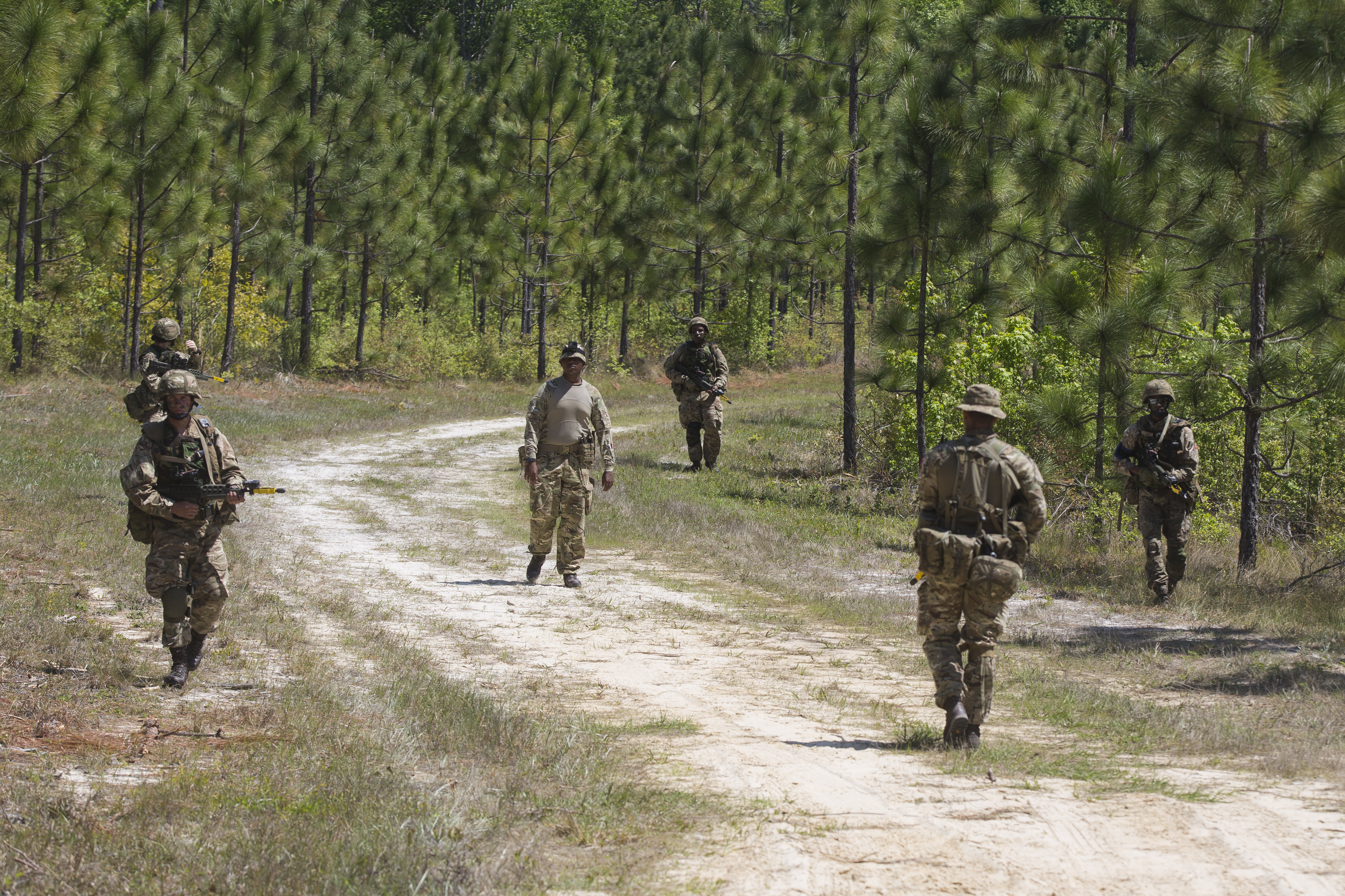
Royal Bermuda Regiment soldiers undergoing Junior Non-Commissioned Officer training at USMC Camp Lejeune in May 2018

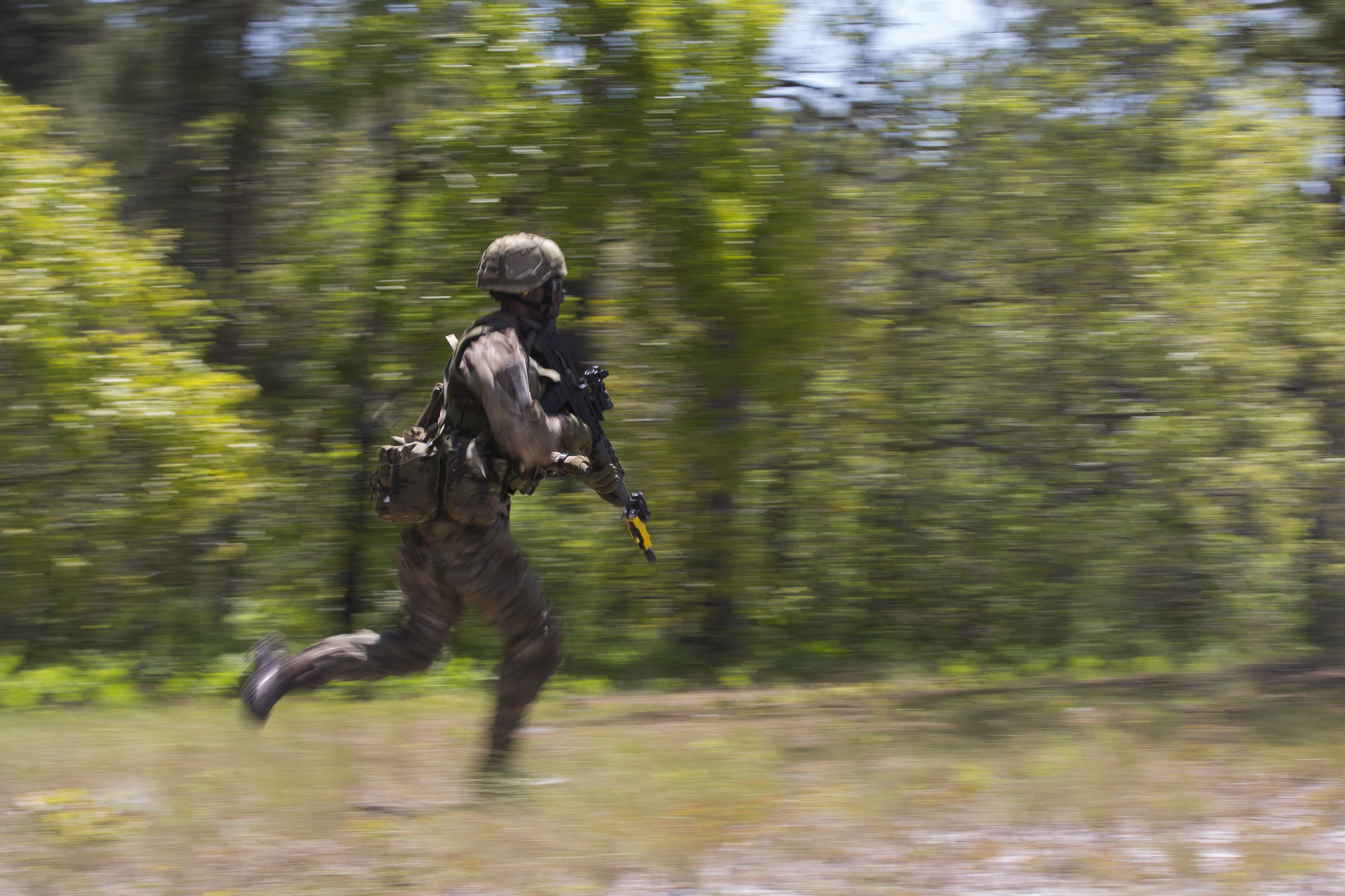
Junior Non-Commissioned Officers Cadre train at Camp Lejeune in 2018

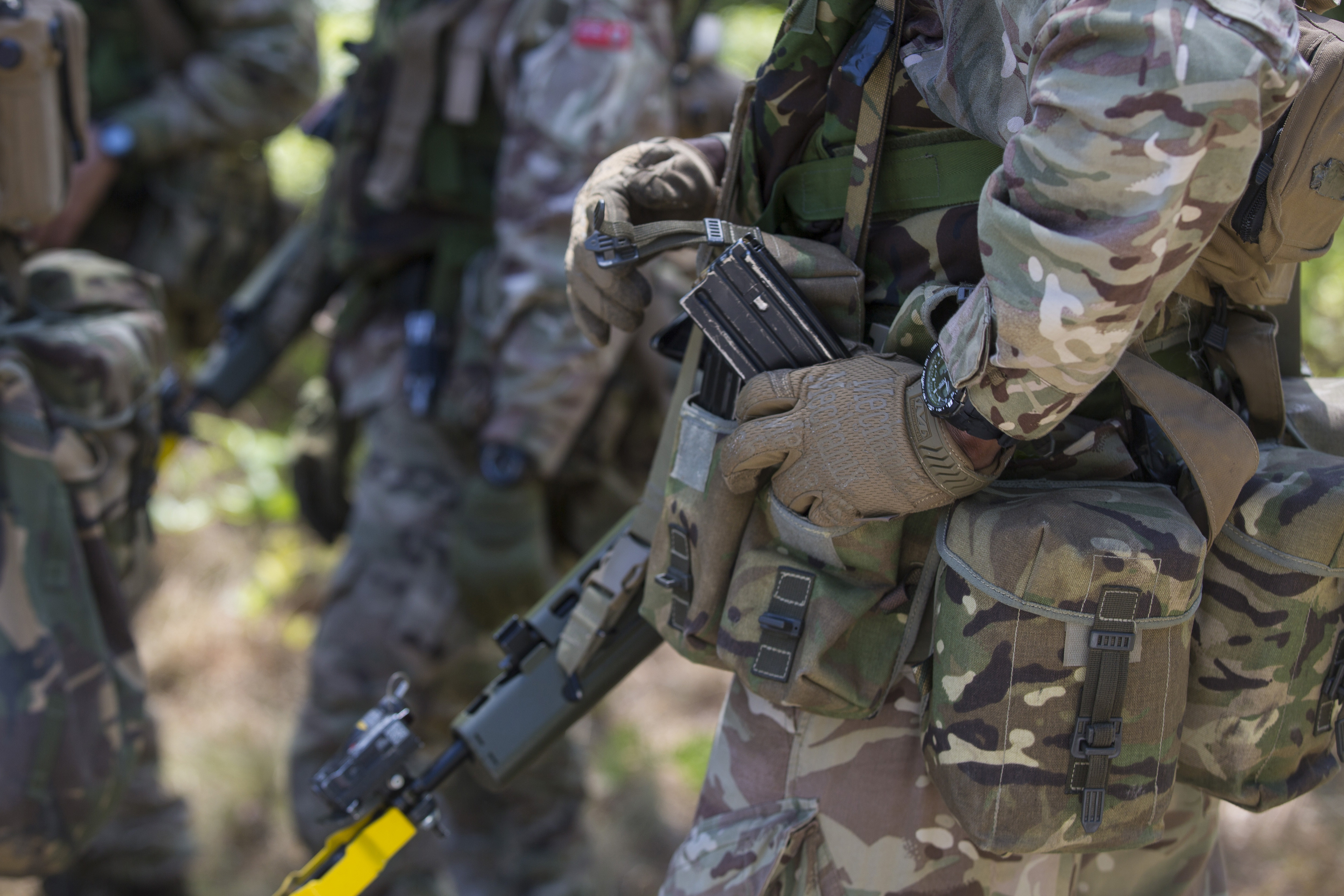
Junior Non-Commissioned Officers Cadre soldiers train at Camp Lejeune in 2018

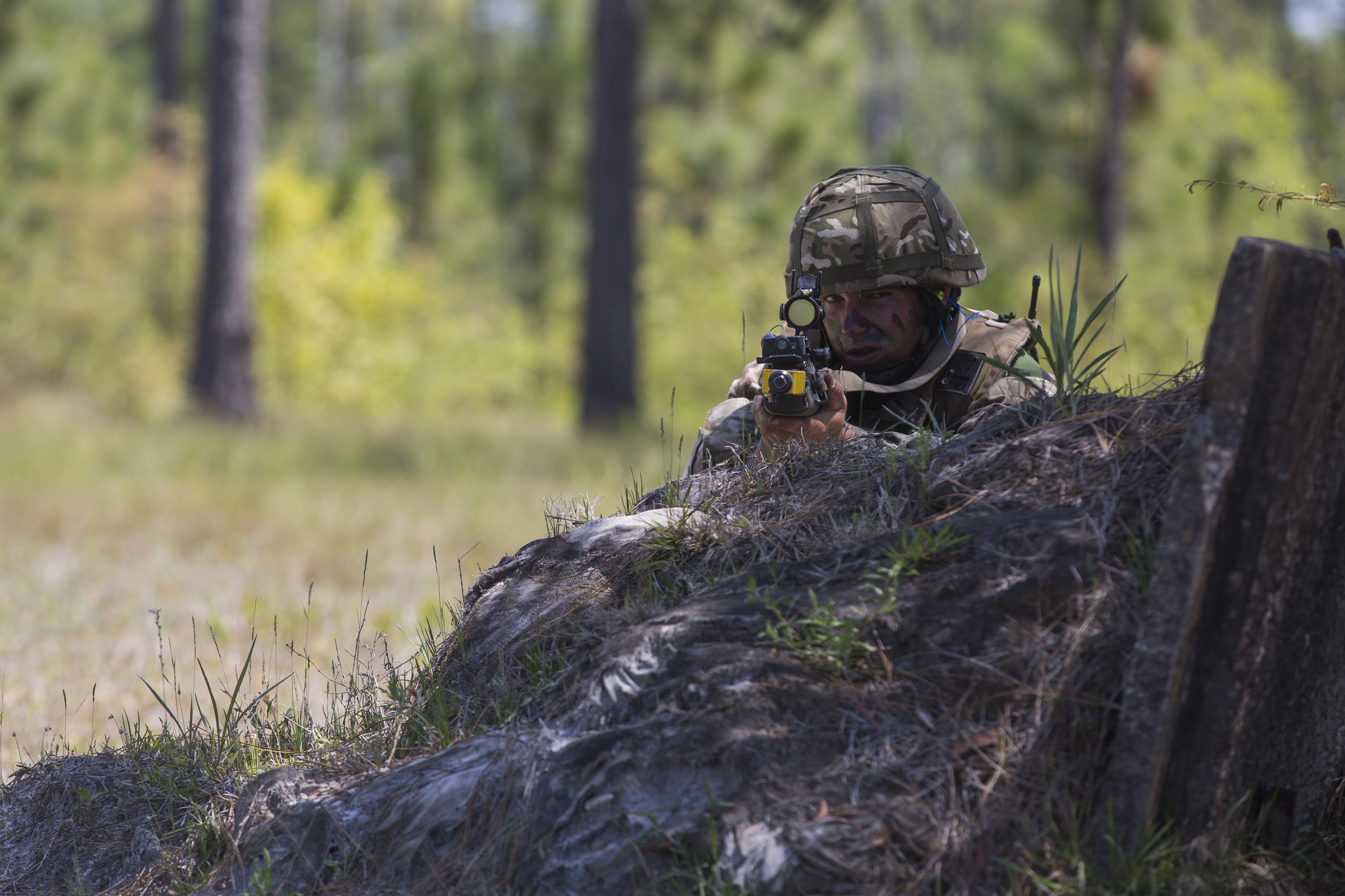
Junior Non-Commissioned Officers Cadre soldier training at Camp Lejeune in 2018

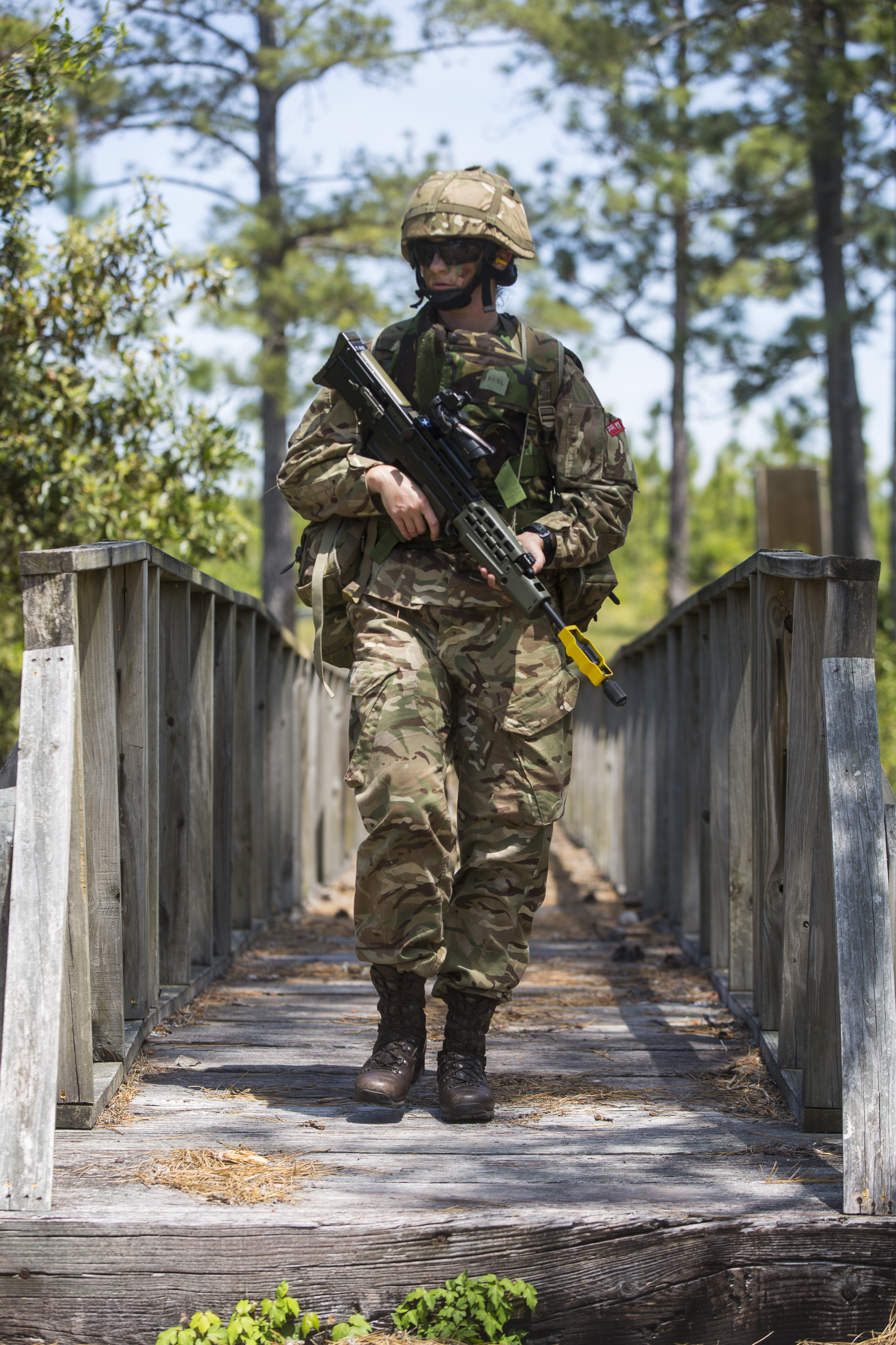
Royal Bermuda Regiment soldier with an L85A2 at USMC Camp Lejeune in 2018

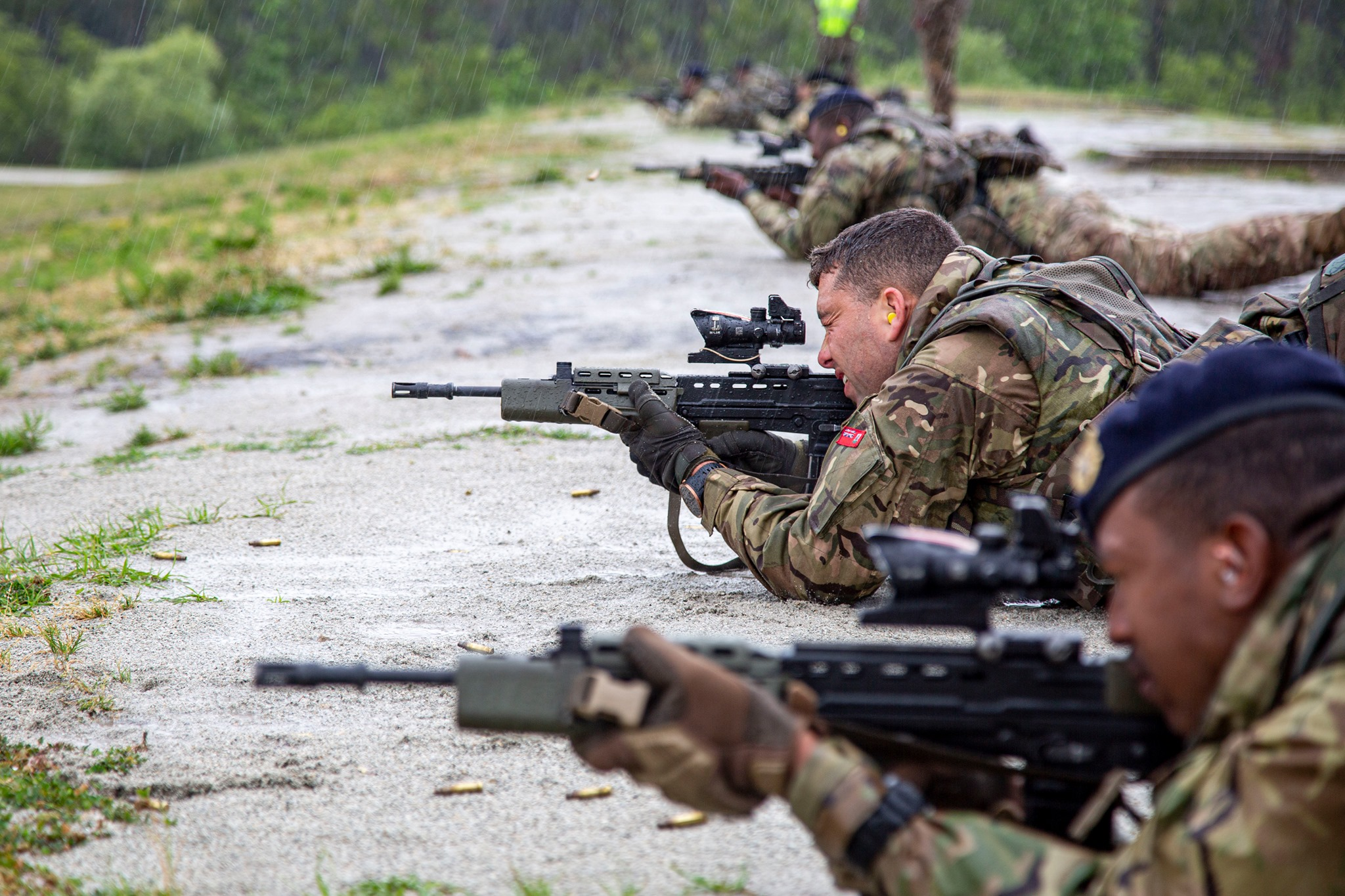
Royal Bermuda Regiment shoot at Stonebay Rifle Range, USMCB Camp Lejeune on 12 May, 2021.

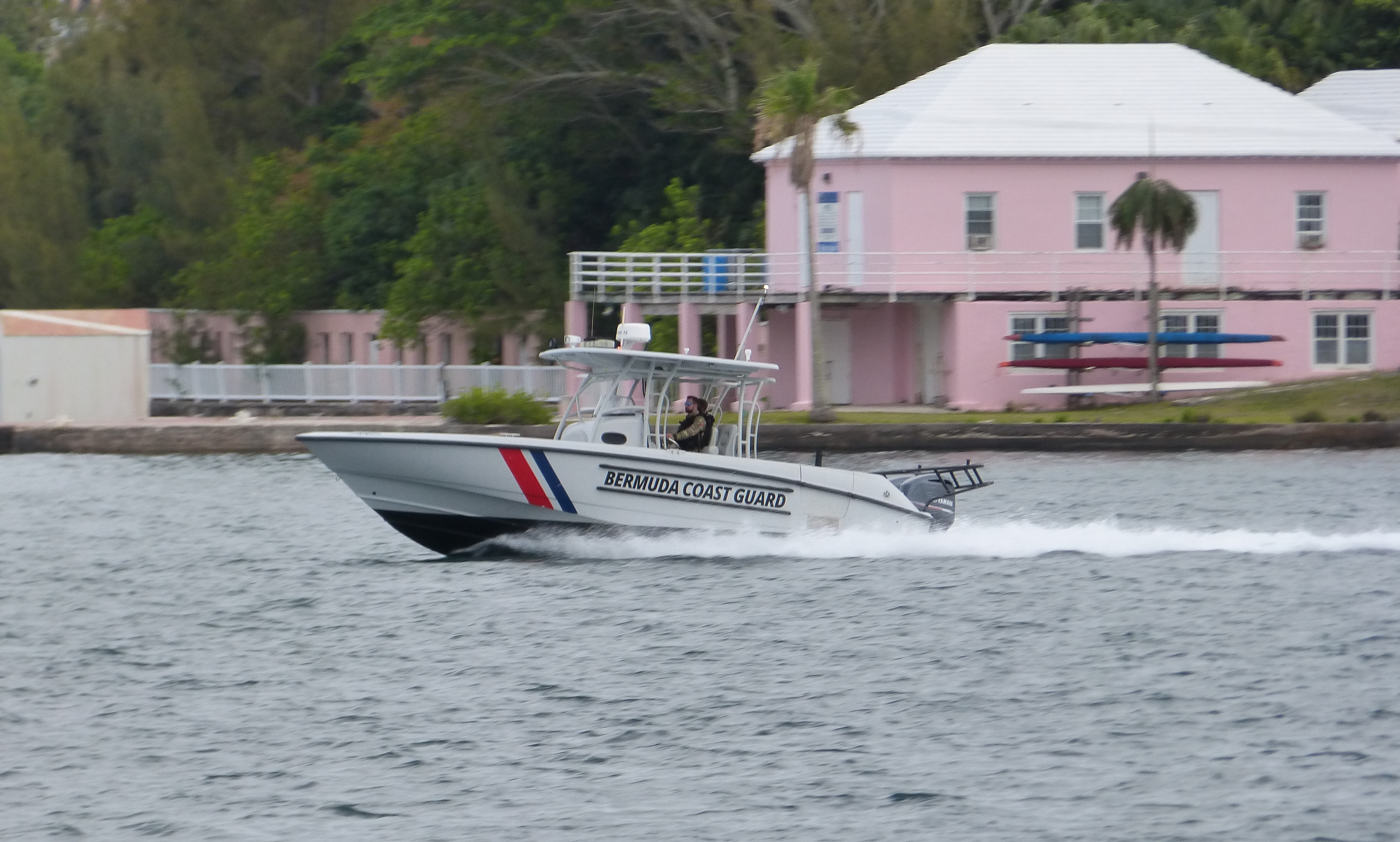
Royal Bermuda Regiment Coast Guard powerboat on Hamilton Harbour in 2026

== See also ==
- Cayman Islands Regiment
- Turks and Caicos Islands Regiment
- Royal Gibraltar Regiment
- Falkland Islands Defence Force
- Royal Montserrat Defence Force
- British Army Training and Support Unit Belize
- Overseas military bases of the United Kingdom

== Order of precedence ==
Preceded by Royal Gibraltar Regiment	Order of Precedence	Succeeded by
