= Operational Service Medal (Bermuda) =

- Type: Service medal
- Awarded for: Operational service
- Description: Silver disk, 36 mm diameter.
- Presented by: Bermuda
- Eligibility: Members of the Royal Bermuda Regiment
- Campaign: Multiple
- Clasps: Bermuda
- Established: 2025
- Service ribbon of the medal

The Operational Service Medal is a service medal awarded by the Government of Bermuda, a British Overseas Territory located in the Atlantic Ocean. The medal was initially announced in November 2024 for members of the Royal Bermuda Regiment, the territory's primary military force, to recognise its service in various operational environments. The award of the medal was to date from the foundation of the Royal Bermuda Regiment, which was formed in September 1965 through the amalgamation of the Bermuda Militia Artillery and the Bermuda Rifles.

A number of qualifying criteria were established for award of the medal, with an established list of operations also published that were eligible for recognition - eligible operations were required to be ones where the regiment was officially mobilised through an order endorsed by the Governor of Bermuda.

== Medal ==
The Operational Service Medal is silver and circular in shape.

- Obverse: the crowned effigy of King Charles III, the Bermudan monarch, with the inscription CHARLES III DEI GRATIA REX FID. DEF.
- Reverse: the cap badge of the Royal Bermuda Regiment, surrounded by the inscription FOR OPERATIONAL SERVICE
- Ribbon: a thin sky blue central stripe, flanked by wider stripes of red and navy blue.
- Clasp: Bermuda clasp awarded to all recipients.

== Qualifying criteria ==
The Operational Service Medal is awarded to anyone serving in the Royal Bermuda Regiment that meets the following criteria:

- Have seen service in the regiment since 15 September 1965
- Minimum 30 days accumulated service in one or more specific types of operation:
  - Disaster relief operations, either in Bermuda or overseas
  - Humanitarian assistance operations, either in Bermuda or overseas
  - Security operations, either in Bermuda or overseas
  - Any other operations, meeting requirements for risk and rigour, that have been recognised as qualifying by the Governor of Bermuda

An initial set of events and operations that were identified as being eligible for award of the medal was published in November 2025:

- 1965 – BELCO Strike
- 1968 – Civil Disturbances
- 1973 – Assassination of the Governor of Bermuda
- 1977 – Riots following execution of Erskine Durrant "Buck" Burrows and Larry Tacklyn
- 1981 – General Strike
- 1987 – Hurricane Emily
- 1988 – Hurricane Gilbert
- 1989 – Hurricane Hugo
- 1990 – Summit meeting between Margaret Thatcher and George H.W. Bush
- 1991 – Summit meeting between John Major and George H.W. Bush
- 1992 – Tornado
- 1995 – Hurricane Felix
- 1996 – Xing Da incident
- 1999 – Hurricane Gert
- 2001 – Hurricane Erin
- 2001 – September 11 attacks
- 2003 – Hurricane Fabian
- 2004 – Hurricane Ivan
- 2005 – Operation SPICE RELIEF
- 2006 – Hurricane Florence
- 2007 – Operation WICKET KEEPER
- 2008 – Hurricane Ike
- 2008 – Tropical Storm Fay
- 2010 – Hurricane Igor
- 2014 – Hurricane Gonzalo
- 2015 – Hurricane Joaquin
- 2016 – Tropical Storm Karl
- 2016 – Hurricane Nicole
- 2017 – Operation RUMAN
- 2019 – Hurricane Humberto
- 2019 – Hurricane Jerry
- 2020 – Operation SOTER
- 2020 – Hurricane Paulette
- 2020 – Hurricane Teddy
- 2021 – Operation SOTER 2
- 2021 – Operation TRANQUILLITAS
- 2022 – Hurricane Fiona
- 2024 – Hurricane Ernesto
- 2025 – Hurricane Imelda
