= List of British Army regiments and corps =

This is a current list of regiments and corps of the British Armed Forces.

== Household Cavalry and Royal Armoured Corps ==
=== Household Cavalry ===
- The Life Guards (Note: For operational purposes the two Household Cavalry regiments form a pair of joint units; the Household Cavalry Regiment and the Household Cavalry Mounted Regiment)
- The Blues and Royals (Royal Horse Guards and 1st Dragoons)

=== Light cavalry ===
- 1st The Queen's Dragoon Guards
- The Royal Scots Dragoon Guards (Carabiniers and Greys)
- The Royal Dragoon Guards
- The Queen's Royal Hussars (The Queen's Own and Royal Irish)
- The Royal Lancers (Queen Elizabeths' Own)
- The King's Royal Hussars
- The Light Dragoons

=== Royal Tank Regiment ===
- The Royal Tank Regiment

=== Yeomanry ===
- The Royal Yeomanry
- The Royal Wessex Yeomanry
- The Queen's Own Yeomanry
- The Scottish and North Irish Yeomanry

== Infantry ==
When a regiment is given as n + n battalions, the first number is regular army battalions, and the second is Army Reserve battalions.

=== Foot guards ===
- Grenadier Guards - 1 + 0 battalion (Note: The Grenadier Guards, Coldstream Guards, Scots Guards and Irish Guards each have incremental companies stationed in London on public duties that maintains the history and traditions of each regiment's 2nd Battalion, which are all in suspended animation. An additional incremental company stationed in Edinburgh forms part of the Royal Regiment of Scotland and maintains the traditions of that regiment's 5th Battalion) (Note: The Grenadier Guards, Coldstream Guards, Scots Guards and Irish Guards each have a reserve company. These companies formed the separate London Regiment until May 2022, when they were redsignated the London Guards, without being a regiment in their own right)
- Coldstream Guards - 1 + 0 battalion
- Scots Guards - 1 + 0 battalion
- Irish Guards - 1 + 0 battalion
- Welsh Guards - 1 + 0 battalion
- London Guards - 0 + 1 battalion

=== Line infantry and rifles ===
- The Royal Regiment of Scotland - 3 + 2 battalions
- The Princess of Wales's Royal Regiment - 1 + 2 battalions
- The Duke of Lancaster's Regiment - 1 + 1 battalions
- The Royal Regiment of Fusiliers - 1 + 1 battalions
- The Royal Anglian Regiment - 2 + 1 battalions
- The Royal Yorkshire Regiment - 2 + 1 battalions
- The Royal Welsh - 1 + 1 battalions
- The Mercian Regiment - 1 + 1 battalions
- The Royal Irish Regiment - 1 + 1 battalion
- The Royal Gurkha Rifles - 2 + 0 battalions (Note: The Royal Gurkha Rifles also has three additional reinforcement companies attached to battalions of the Ranger Regiment)
- The Rifles - 4 + 3 battalions

=== Airborne infantry ===
- The Parachute Regiment - 3 + 1 battalions (Note: One battalion of the Parachute Regiment is assigned as part of the Special Forces Support Group)

=== Special operations ===
- Ranger Regiment - 4 + 0 battalions

== Special forces ==
- Special Air Service - 1 + 2 regiments
- Special Reconnaissance Regiment - 1 regiment

== Combat support and Army Air Corps ==
- Royal Regiment of Artillery - 15 + 6 regiments (Note: The regular Royal Artillery includes four units cap badged as Royal Horse Artillery and one cap-badged as King's Gurkha Artillery)
- Corps of Royal Engineers - 15 + 7 regiments (Note: The Royal Engineers includes one unit cap badged as Queen's Gurkha Engineers)
- Royal Corps of Signals - 13 + 4 regiments (Note: The Royal Signals includes a number of individual squadrons cap badged as Queen's Gurkha Signals)
- Army Air Corps - 7 + 1 regiments
- Intelligence Corps - 3 + 4 battalions
- Royal Monmouthshire Royal Engineers (Militia) - 0 + 1 Regiment (Note: The Royal Monmouthshire Royal Engineers is operationally part of the Corps of Royal Engineers)
- Honourable Artillery Company - 0 + 1 Regiment (Note: The Honourable Artillery Company has four sub-units; one artillery battery providing reserves to 7 (Parachute) Regiment, Royal Horse Artillery; and three ISR squadrons attached to the Land Special Operations Force)

== Combat service support ==
- Royal Army Chaplains' Department - approx. 150
- Royal Logistic Corps - 13 + 11 regiments (Note: The Royal Logistic Corps includes one unit cap badged as Queen's Own Gurkha Logistic Regiment)
- Royal Army Medical Service - 9 + 15 units
- Corps of Royal Electrical and Mechanical Engineers - 8 + 3 battalions
- Adjutant General's Corps - 4 + 0 branches;
  - Staff and Personnel Support (SPS) (Note: The Staff and Personnel Support branch includes a company of specialist Gurkha clerks cap badged as the Gurkha Staff and Personnel Support)
  - Educational and Training Services (ETS)
  - Army Legal Services (ALS)
  - Provost Branch
    - Royal Military Police (RMP)
    - Military Provost Staff (MPS)
    - Military Provost Guard Service (MPGS)
- Royal Army Veterinary Corps - 2 + 0 regiments
- Small Arms School Corps
- Royal Army Physical Training Corps
- General Service Corps
- Royal Corps of Army Music - 14 + 20 bands

== British Overseas Territories regiments ==
- Royal Gibraltar Regiment - 1 + 0 battalion
- Royal Bermuda Regiment - 0 + 1 battalion
- Royal Montserrat Defence Force - 0 + 1 platoon
- Cayman Islands Regiment - 0 + 1 company
- Turks and Caicos Regiment - 0 + 1 platoon
- Falkland Islands Defence Force - 0 + 1 company
