= Army Act =

Army Act 1992 (Note: Section 6.)
- Act of Parliament
- Parliament of the United Kingdom
- Long title: An Act to provide for members of the Ulster Defence Regiment to cease to be members of that Regiment at the end of June 1992; to provide for the amendment of section 2 of the Armed Forces Act 1966 in relation to service in Northern Ireland; and for connected purposes.
- Citation: 1992 c. 39
- Territorial extent: United Kingdom

Dates
- Royal assent: 16 March 1992
- Commencement: 1 July 1992 (Note: Section 5.)
- Repealed: 31 October 2009 (Note: The Armed Forces Act 2006 (Commencement No. 5) Order 2009).
Other legislation
| Amends | Armed Forces Act 1966 |
| Repealed by | Armed Forces Act 2006 |

Status: Repealed

Text of statute as originally enacted

Revised text of statute as amended

Until 1689, mutiny was regulated in England by Articles of War instituted by the monarch and effective only in a period of war. This use of the crown's prerogative by Charles I in a contentious manner (the crown's right to make and enforce rules for the military) caused Parliament to pass the Petition of Right in 1628. This Act stated that neither civilians nor soldiers and officers who were in England during peace were subject to military courts or law. Only common-law courts and courts of equity could exercise authority over individuals in peacetime England. Because the articles of war did not fall under these court's jurisdiction, military law could not be applied to anyone in England, whether soldier or civilian.

In 1689, the first Mutiny Act was passed which passed the responsibility to enforce discipline within the military to Parliament. The Mutiny Act, altered in 1803, and the Articles of War defined the nature and punishment of mutiny until the latter were replaced by the Army Discipline and Regulation Act 1879. This, in turn, was replaced the Army Act 1881 (44 & 45 Vict. c. 58).

The Army Act 1881 applied to members of the regular British Army, whether during wartime or peace. Although the traditional reserve military forces (not to be confused with the newer British Army reserves made up of regular soldiers who remained liable for recall after completing their full-time engagements) of the Militia, Yeomanry, and Volunteer Force were increasingly integrated with the British Army during the latter decades of the nineteenth century, as with the previous Mutiny Acts, the members of these units were not subject to the Army Act unless embodied for active service or for training with the regular army. This remained the case with the Territorial Force (created by the amalgamation of the Yeomanry and the Volunteer Force under the Territorial and Reserve Forces Act 1907) and the Territorial Army as the Territorial Force was renamed by the Territorial Army and Militia Act 1921.

As specified in the Army Act 1955, in reference to the Act's application to reservists, pensioners, and members of the Territorial Army:

PART VI

APPLICATION OF ACT AND SUPPLEMENTAL PROVISIONS

205. (1) The following persons are subject to military law: ...

(e) every officer holding a commission in the Territorial Army who is on the active list (as defined by the regulations for the Territorial Army) or on the permanent staff of the Territorial Army, or, being in the Territorial Army reserve, is doing duty with any body of troops for the time being subject to military law or is ordered on any duty or service for which he is liable as an officer of that reserve;

(g) every warrant officer, non-commissioned officer and man of the army reserve when called out on permanent service or in aid of the civil power or when undergoing annual or other training (whether in pursuance of an obligation or not), or when otherwise employed in Her Majesty's service as mentioned in paragraph (c) of this subsection;

(h) every warrant officer, non-commissioned officer and man of the Territorial Army when embodied or called out for home defence service, when undergoing training or attending drills or parades (whether in pursuance of an obligation or not), or when serving on the permanent staff of the Territorial Army;

(i) every person in receipt of a pension in respect of service in the regular forces, or of such service and other service, who is employed in Her Majesty's service as mentioned in paragraph (c) of this subsection;

(j) every person not otherwise subject to military law who is serving in any force raised by order of Her Majesty outside the United Kingdom and is under the command of an officer holding a land forces commission or a commission in the Territorial Army;

(k) every member of the Home Guard when on duty (as defined in the Home Guard Act, 1951) or during any period (as so defined) during which the platoon or other part of the Home Guard to which he belongs is mustered (as so defined).

A number of regiments of the British Army, most of which are reserve units on Territorial Army lines, based and recruited in British Overseas Territories, although technically falling under the remit and control of the British Government (as national government, whereas the territorial government is strictly a local government to which most areas of internal government have been delegated) exist under acts of local legislatures, requiring clauses of those acts to also apply the Army Act to these units. These units, as of 2020, include the Royal Bermuda Regiment (RBR), the Royal Gibraltar Regiment, the Falkland Islands Defence Force (FIDF), the Royal Montserrat Defence Force, with the Cayman Islands Regiment and the Turks and Caicos Regiment being in the process of formation. With the exceptions of the Royal Bermuda Regiment and the Royal Gibraltar Regiment, these units have been defined by the British Government as auxiliary to the British Army, making them British military units, but not acknowledged as parts of the British Army.

The Parliament of Bermuda's Defence Act, 1965, which legislated the amalgamation of the Bermuda Militia Artillery and the Bermuda Rifles to form the Royal Bermuda Regiment (at the time, the Bermuda Regiment) in 1965, specifies when the Army Act applies to personnel of the regiment:

Defence Act 1965

Part II

33 Army Act applies when acting with regular forces

(1) Subject to section 32, every member of the regiment shall, while acting with a body of her Majesty’s regular forces during an embodiment, be subject to military law under the Army Act, and the Army Act shall apply to such member of the regiment as if he were a member of the regular forces.

(2) For the purposes of this section and section 34, a member of the regiment or of a sub-unit of the regiment shall be deemed to be "acting with a body of Her Majesty’s regular forces" when so ordered to act by the Governor.

34 General command when acting with regular forces

(1) The regiment, or any part thereof, shall while acting with a body of Her Majesty's regular forces be under the general command of the officer commanding that body of regular forces if that officer is of equal or senior equivalent rank to the officer commanding the regiment or that part thereof, as the case may be.

(2) When acting with a body of Her Majesty’s regular forces, an officer of the regiment will take rank and precedence below officers of the regular forces of the same or equivalent rank.

== Annual renewal ==
The Army Act 1881 was renewed by Parliament annually, unless both Houses of Parliament approved a draft Order in Council continuing its life, with amendments or consolidations as required. The UK Parliamentary website lists:

- Army Act 1881 (44 & 45 Vict. c. 58)
- Army Act 1882
- Army Act 1911
- Army Act 1914
- Army Act 1916
- Army Act 1926
- Army Act 1938
- Army Act 1953
- Army Act 1955
- Army Act 1957
- Army Act 1958
- Army Act 1992 (c. 39)
