= Hurricane Grace =

Category 3 Atlantic hurricane in 2021

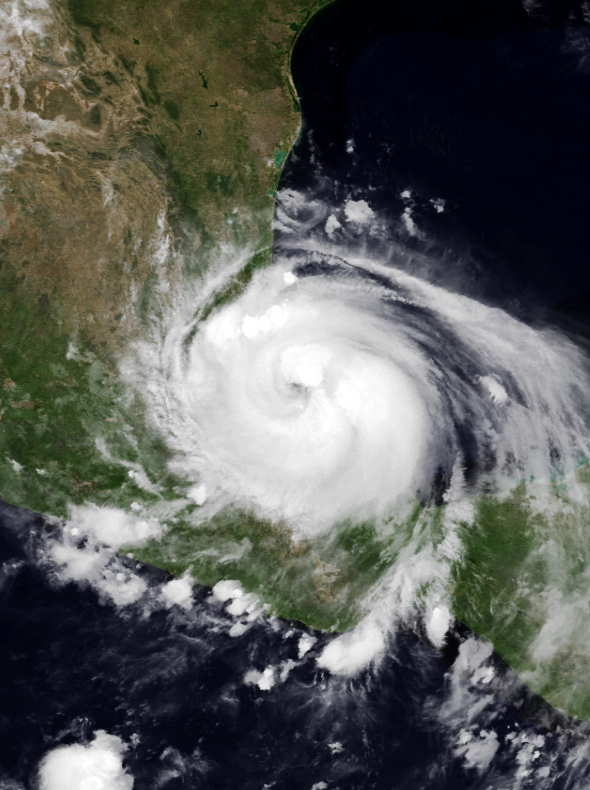
- Grace shortly after peak intensity making landfall in Veracruz on August 21.

Meteorological history
- Formed: August 13, 2021
- Dissipated: August 21, 2021

Category 3 major hurricane
- 1-minute sustained (SSHWS/NWS)
- Highest winds: 120 mph (195 km/h)
- Lowest pressure: 967 mbar (hPa); 28.56 inHg

Overall effects
- Fatalities: 16
- Damage: $513 million (2021 USD)
- Areas affected: Lesser Antilles, Greater Antilles, Yucatan Peninsula, Central Mexico
- IBTrACS
- Part of the 2021 Atlantic hurricane season

Hurricane Grace was the strongest tropical cyclone to make landfall in the Mexican state of Veracruz. Grace impacted much of the Leeward Islands and Greater Antilles as a tropical storm, before causing more substantial impacts in the Yucatán Peninsula and Veracruz at hurricane status. The seventh named storm, second hurricane, and first major hurricane of the 2021 Atlantic hurricane season, it originated from a tropical wave in the main development region. The primitive system tracked west-northwest across the Atlantic Ocean towards the Antilles, becoming a tropical depression on August 14. It strengthened into Tropical Storm Grace later the same day, but weakened back to a depression due to an unfavorable environment. After moving near Haiti as a tropical depression, it strengthened back to a tropical storm and became a hurricane on August 18, reaching an initial peak intensity with maximum sustained winds of 85 mph (135 km/h) and a pressure of 978 mbar (28.88 inHg). Grace weakened back to a tropical storm again after its landfall in the Yucatán Peninsula and emerged into the Bay of Campeche, entering a very favorable environment for intensification hours later. Grace then rapidly intensified into a Category 3 hurricane with winds of 120 mph (190 km/h) in about 24 hours. The storm made its final landfall in the state of Veracruz at peak intensity and quickly degenerated into a remnant low over mainland Mexico on August 21; however, its remnants later regenerated into Tropical Storm Marty in the Eastern Pacific on August 23.

In Haiti, Grace exacerbated effects from an earthquake three days prior to the passage of the storm. Streets were flooded and power outages were reported in Jamaica. In Mexico, the storm caused landslides and destroyed buildings. In total, Grace killed 16 people: 4 in Haiti and 12 in Mexico. The storm caused an estimated $513 million (2021 USD) in damages.

== Meteorological history ==
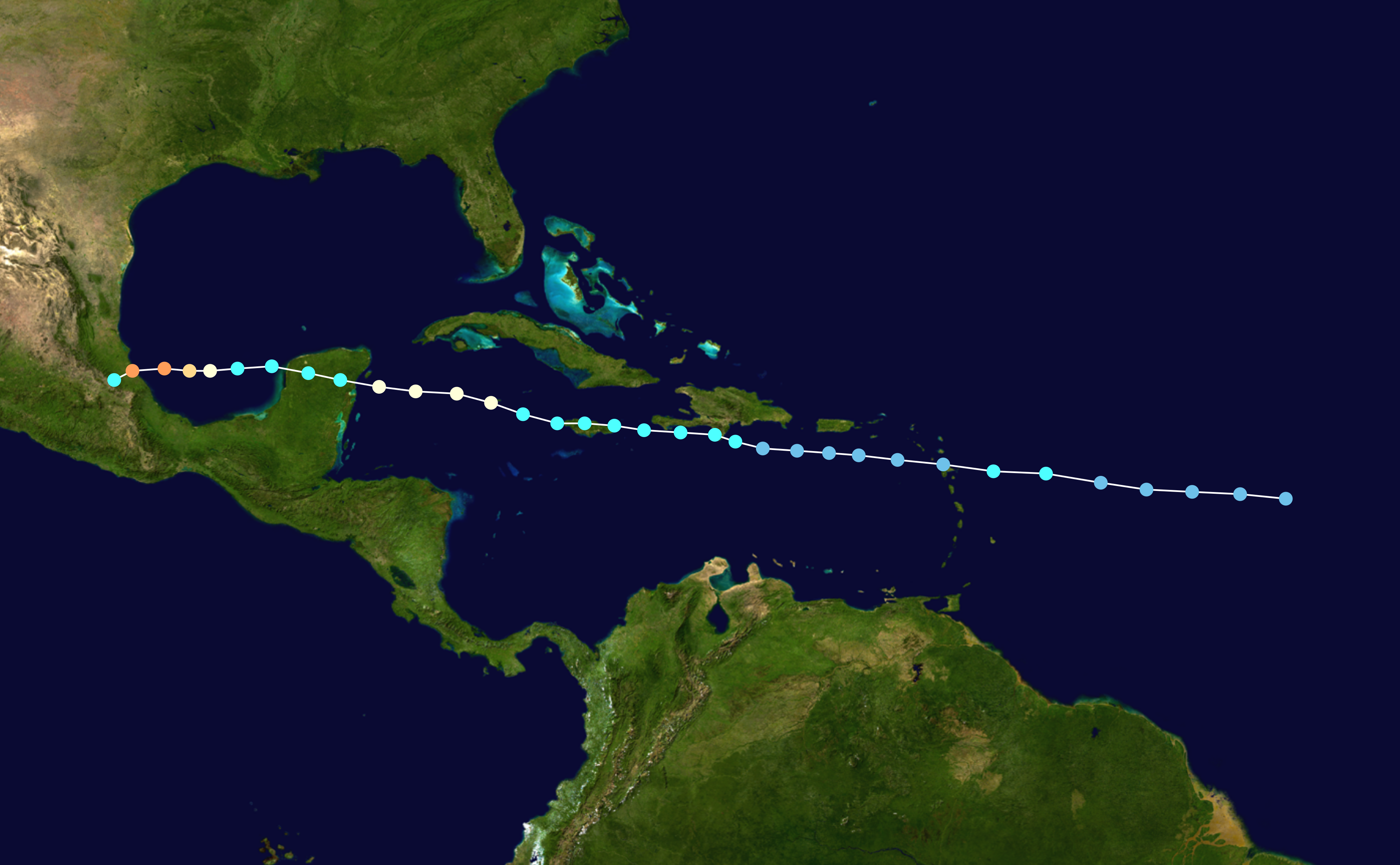
Map plotting the storm's track and intensity, according to the Saffir–Simpson scale Map key Saffir–Simpson scale Tropical depression (≤38 mph, ≤62 km/h) Tropical storm (39–73 mph, 63–118 km/h) Category 1 (74–95 mph, 119–153 km/h) Category 2 (96–110 mph, 154–177 km/h) Category 3 (111–129 mph, 178–208 km/h) Category 4 (130–156 mph, 209–251 km/h) Category 5 (≥157 mph, ≥252 km/h) Unknown Storm type Tropical cyclone Subtropical cyclone Extratropical cyclone, remnant low, tropical disturbance, or monsoon depression

Grace originated from a tropical wave that moved off the western coast of Africa on August 9. On August 10, the National Hurricane Center (NHC) began monitoring a tropical disturbance near the Cabo Verde Islands. A Tropical Weather Outlook on the following day noted that the system was producing disorganized showers and thunderstorms. However, environmental conditions were becoming more conductive for development, and by August 13, the system was designated as Potential Tropical Cyclone Seven while located about 840 miles (1,350 km) east of the Leeward Islands. By 06:00 UTC the next day, the NHC initiated advisories on Tropical Depression Seven approximately 480 miles (770 km) east of the Leeward Islands. After the cyclone was found to have tropical storm-force winds on August 14 at 09:00 UTC, the NHC upgraded the depression to a tropical storm, naming it Grace. However, strong wind shear caused Grace to weaken back to a tropical depression on August 15. It made landfall as a tropical depression in the Barahona Peninsula at 15:00 UTC on August 16. Continuing west-northwestward, Grace brushed the south coast of Haiti early on August 17. At 06:00 UTC on August 17, Grace was upgraded to a tropical storm southwest of Haiti, after a reconnaissance flight observed tropical storm-force winds. Approximately 11 hours later, Grace made landfall in Jamaica near Annotto Bay, Saint Mary Parish, with winds of 50 mph (80 km/h). After re-emerging into the Caribbean late on August 17, Grace continued to intensify due to favorable conditions and rapidly organized as it passed south of the Cayman Islands. By 15:00 UTC on August 18, a Hurricane Hunters flight found that Grace had intensified into a Category 1 hurricane. The storm reached an initial peak intensity with winds of 85 mph (137 km/h) and a barometric pressure of 978 mbar (28.9 inHg) early on August 19. At 09:45 UTC on that day, Grace made its first landfall at that intensity near Tulum, Quintana Roo. Shortly after, the storm weakened to a strong tropical storm.

After nearly 12 hours over land, Grace emerged into the Bay of Campeche. The storm then began reintensifying, becoming a hurricane again by 12:00 UTC on August 20. Thereafter, Grace underwent rapid intensification, becoming a Category 2 hurricane by 00:00 UTC on August 21. Within the next three hours, the storm became a Category 3 hurricane. Around 05:30 UTC on August 21, Grace made another landfall in Mexico near Tecolutla, Veracruz, at peak intensity, with winds of 120 mph (190 km/h) and a pressure of 967 mbar (28.6 inHg); this was the strongest landfall in the state's history. Operationally, Grace was assessed to have been even stronger at landfall, with winds of 125 mph (201 km/h) and a pressure of 962 mbar (28.4 inHg), which would have tied it with Hurricane Karl of 2010 as the most powerful hurricane ever recorded in the Bay of Campeche by maximum sustained winds; however, it was downgraded slightly in post-season reanalysis. After landfall, it rapidly weakened to a Category 1 hurricane over the mountainous terrain of Mexico. The storm continued to rapidly weaken over the rough terrain and was downgraded to a tropical storm three hours later. At 21:00 UTC, Grace degenerated into a tropical disturbance over Mexico, and its low-level circulation dissipated. The mid-level center and remnants of Grace would later redevelop into Tropical Storm Marty in the Eastern Pacific on August 23. Marty was short-lived, as it degenerated into a remnant low on August 24.

== Preparations ==
=== Leeward Islands ===
Satellite loop of Tropical Storm Grace approaching and passing over the Leeward Islands on August 14.

At 15:00 UTC on August 13, when Potential Tropical Cyclone Seven was designated, tropical storm watches were issued for the islands of Antigua and Barbuda, Saint Kitts and Nevis, Montserrat, Saba, and Sint Eustatius. The Government of France issued a tropical storm watch for Saint Martin and Saint Barthelemy. Afterward, more watches and warnings were issued in the U.S Virgin Islands and Puerto Rico. The Government of Antigua and Barbuda issued a tropical storm watch on Anguilla and the British Virgin Islands.

Later that day, tropical storm warnings were issued for the islands of Antigua and Barbuda, Saint Kitts and Nevis, Montserrat, and Anguilla. Saba and Sint Eustatius would also be under tropical storm warnings issued by the Government of France.

=== Hispaniola ===
On the south coast of the Dominican Republic, a tropical storm watch was issued by the government as the storm was approaching the Lesser Antilles. As the storm came closer, the government issued a tropical storm warning from Cabo Caucedo to Samaná, while the rest of the country was under a tropical storm watch. At 5 AM AST (0900 UTC) a tropical storm warning was issued from the southern Haitian Border to Cabo Caucedo. At 18:00 UTC on August 16, after Grace exited the Dominican Republic, all tropical storm watches were lifted.

On August 14, when Grace entered the Caribbean, a tropical storm watch was issued for the entire coast of Haiti. The NHC predicted 4 to 7 inches of rain to fall in the country. Grace's impacts to Haiti were likely more extreme than typical for this kind of storm, due to the magnitude 7.2 earthquake that had occurred in the country just days earlier.

=== Jamaica ===
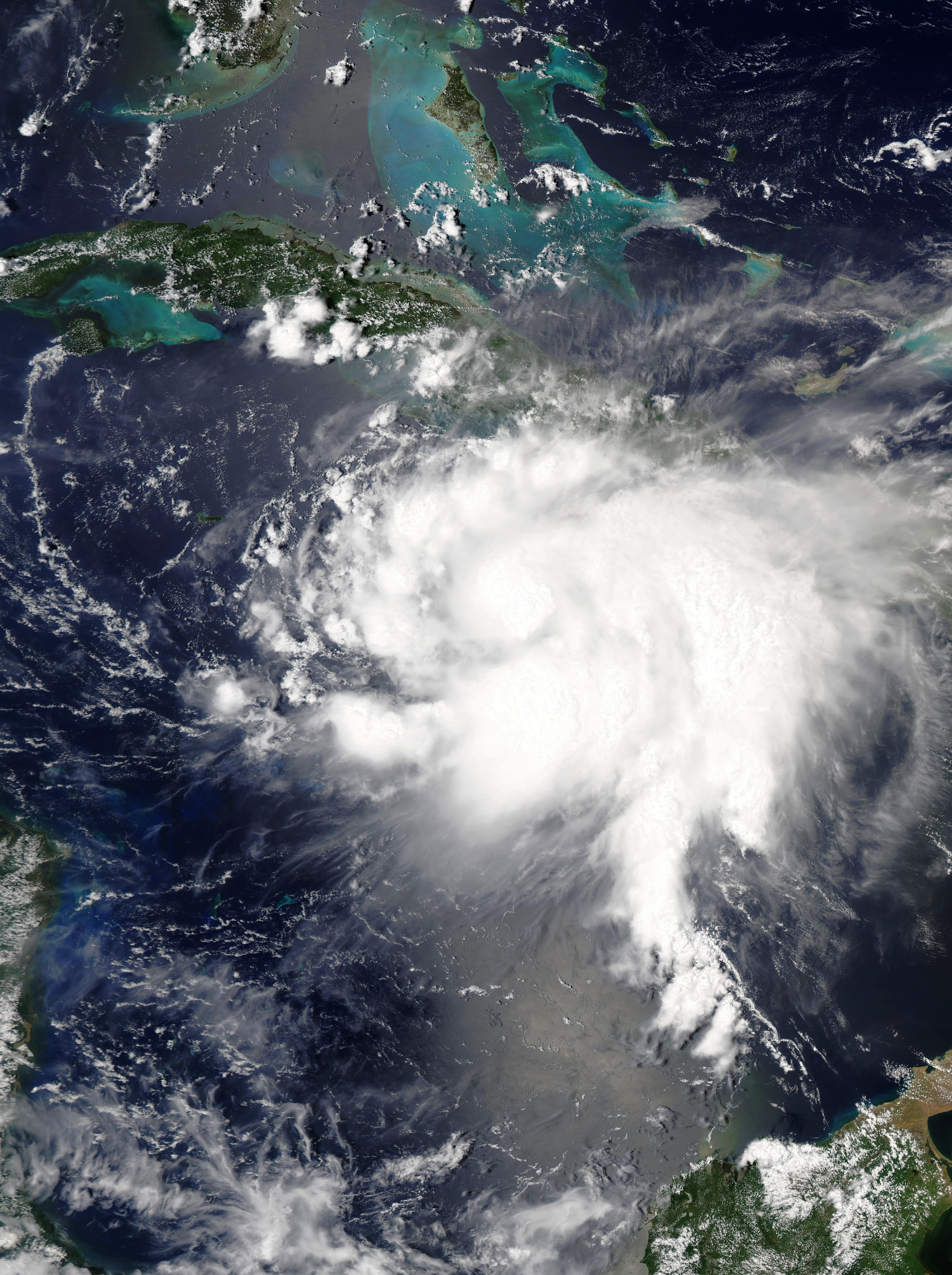
Tropical Storm Grace within Jamaica's vicinity on August 17

When Grace was still a depression off the coast of Dominican Republic, a tropical storm watch was in effect for the entire island, as issued by the Government. Jamaica would be under a tropical storm watch up until Grace neared landfall. At 500 PM EDT (2100 UTC) the Government of Jamaica issued a tropical storm warning for the island as Grace was expected to make landfall on the island in August 17. After leaving the island, a tropical storm warning remained in effect until 09:00 UTC on August 18, when the Jamaican Government discontinued it. Two shelters were opened across the country.

=== Cayman Islands ===
The Cayman Islands were put under a tropical storm warning at 15:00 UTC on August 16 when Grace was 575 mi (925 km) east-southeast of Grand Cayman and heading towards the Cayman Islands. The Cayman Islands were put under a hurricane watch at 21:00 UTC on August 17 when Grace was nearing Grand Cayman. The NEOC was activated along with the Government Emergency Services. The Cayman Islands Regiment and the Cayman Islands Coast Guard were deployed on the Humanitarian Aid & Disaster Response (HADR) mission, The Cayman Islands Cadet Corps were deployed to NEOC to handle the phones and dispatch. Schools were closed and shelters on all three Islands were opened. The National Roads Authority worked on the storm water drainage on roadways. Cayman Airways postponed and canceled flights.

=== Cuba ===
In Cuba, most of the damage has been done to the southern and eastern coasts. The hurricane passed on 17 August. Santiago de Cuba, Bayamo, Las Tunas and Camaguey were the most affected. In the southern provinces, a tropical storm watch was issued. It is also stated that earthquakes occurred, along with the earthquake in Haiti.

=== Mexico ===
Satellite loop of Hurricane Grace rapidly intensifying in the Bay of Campeche on August 20

On August 17, Mexico's government issued a hurricane watch for the Yucatan Peninsula as the National Hurricane Center anticipated a hurricane landfall there. Later that same day, the Government of Mexico issued a hurricane warning on the east coast of Yucatan Peninsula. At 03:00 UTC on August 18, a tropical storm watch was put in effect for the west coast of the Yucatan, which was later upgraded to a tropical storm warning. Soon after, A hurricane watch was put in effect from Puerto Veracruz to Cabo Rojo on the Gulf coast of Mexico, as Grace was nearing landfall in the Yucatan Peninsula. The National Hurricane Center projected widespread areas of 6–12 in (150–300 mm) of rainfall, with up to 18 in (460 mm) in some localized areas. After landfall, the hurricane warning from the east coast of the Yucatan was replaced with a tropical storm warning, and a hurricane warning was put in effect in for Puerto Veracruz to Cabo Rojo. A few hours after exiting the Yucatan, the Meteorological Service of Mexico lifted the Tropical Storm Warning east of Progreso. Soon the watch for the west coast of Yucatan Peninsula was discontinued as Grace continued to move further away. A hurricane warning for Puerto Veracruz to Cabo Rojo continued to stay in effect after the storm made landfall until 15:00 UTC on August 19, when Grace was downgraded into a tropical storm, at which point the hurricane warnings were replaced with tropical storm warnings. A tropical storm warning would still be in effect up until 21:00 UTC on August 21, when Grace weakened to a disturbance.

== Impact ==
=== Caribbean ===
Grace's passage through the Caribbean resulted in a total of $30 million in damages.

==== Dominican Republic ====
As a tropical depression, Grace brought heavy rains throughout the country, which resulted in flooding. 500 homes were damaged, and displaced more than 2,400 people.

==== Haiti ====
Grace brought heavy rainfall to Haiti, reaching around 10 in (250 mm); this caused flooding in areas affected by a magnitude-7.2 earthquake in the country that previously killed thousands. Strong winds destroyed homes previously damaged by the earthquake. Grace's passage disrupted recovery and relief efforts. The storm forced an overcrowded hospital in Les Cayes to relocate patients. Shelters were destroyed by the storm, resulting in earthquake victims losing the little food that they had. Rescue operations were temporarily ceased on August 17 due to Grace's passage. The Directorate of Civil Protection confirmed one death in nan Bambou. Grace killed a total of four people in the country.

==== Jamaica ====
On August 18, Grace made landfall in Jamaica, affecting the country exactly 70 years after a deadly strike by Hurricane Charlie in 1951. The storm brought gusty winds up to 53 mph (85 km/h), and very heavy rainfall reaching 9.8 in (248 mm), both recorded in Kingston. Power outages were reported in all parishes, with the entirety of Portland Parish losing power. A total of 100,000 customers lost power. Damage to power lines and poles was reported. In Saint Andrew Parish, the saturated ground brought down a power pole and power lines. Numerous parishes were affected by flooding. In Clarendon, drivers were rerouted detour after a road was inundated. The Rio Cobre flooded the Bog Walk Gorge, but some motorists ignored warnings, forcing the fire department to rescue them. Strong winds caused losses to plantain and banana farmers in Portland and Saint Mary parishes. In Annotto Bay, the roof of the fire station was blown away. Initial loss on agriculture were calculated at J$700 million (US$4.53 million).

==== Cayman Islands ====
Grace brought minor impacts to Cayman Brac and Little Cayman. However, with it tracking very close to land, it had a much stronger impact on Grand Cayman which experienced winds gusting up to hurricane intensity. Large trees were toppled and there was damage to many roofs. A few poorly constructed buildings received major damage. Several utility poles were toppled and damage to the electrical infrastructure caused Grand Cayman to lose power. Heavy rains caused of flooding throughout the island. Storm surge caused some beach erosion and some coastal roads to be blocked. Several boats broke loose from their moorings and sank. A Cayman Airways Boeing 737-300 got loose, rolled down the apron and crashed into the airport fence. The Cayman Islands Regiment and Cayman Islands Coast Guard had to be deployed to parts of the island, especially to West Bay where they rescued persons from their damaged buildings and flooded areas.

=== Mexico ===
Overall damage in the Yucatán Peninsula and mainland Mexico amounted to US$300 million.

==== Yucatán Peninsula ====
Hurricane Grace caused relatively minor damage across the Yucatán Peninsula, with the most significant effects being power outages with more than 180,000 people losing service. In Tulum, where the storm made landfall, damage was mostly limited to infrastructure, wire lines, trees, and some flooding; normal operations resumed the morning after Grace's passage. The Federal Electrical Commission deployed 1,224 personnel, 339 vehicles, 239 cranes, and 69 aircraft to quickly restore electricity. Emergency services received 78 calls during the storm, with 48 coming from Benito Juárez. A total of 337 people were rescued or evacuated from affected areas, and no injuries were reported. Twenty schools across Quintana Roo suffered minor damage at a cost of 1.7 million pesos (US$83,500).

==== Elsewhere ====
Striking Veracruz as a powerful Category 3 hurricane (despite all the predictions stating it would be nothing more than Category 1), Grace caused significant damage in 58 of the state's 212 municipalities. Severe flooding was reported in Xalapa and other areas within the state of Veracruz upon the storm's second Mexican landfall. Grace blew off windows, uprooted trees, toppled power cables and telegraph poles, leaving debris strewn around Tecolutla. The governor of the state of Veracruz, Cuitláhuac García Jiménez, stated that eight people died from Hurricane Grace in the state. Six of the deaths were from the same family in Xalapa when a landslide buried their home. Another died from airborne debris in Poza Rica while an eighth fatality occurred due to a landslide in the state capitol. Approximately 3,000 schools in the state suffered damage, delaying the planned resumption of in-person classes.

Five people died in the state of Puebla: two from landslides, one from flying debris, one from a fallen tree, and one from a heart attack. An estimated 20,000 homes were damaged or destroyed across Puebla while power outages affected more than 315,000 people. Heavy rains from the remnants of Grace triggered a rockslide near Mazatlán, Sinaloa, killing one person. Localized street flooding occurred in the city itself.

== See also ==
- Timeline of the 2021 Atlantic hurricane season
- List of Category 3 Atlantic hurricanes
- Tropical cyclones in 2021
- Hurricane Hilda (1955) – impacted the Yucatán Peninsula and Veracruz as a Category 3 hurricane
- Hurricane Diana (1990) – Category 2 hurricane that made landfall in similar parts of Mexico
- Hurricane Emily (2005) – Category 5 hurricane that directly impacted the Yucatán Peninsula as a Category 4 hurricane
- Hurricane Dean (2007) – took a very similar track to Grace and made landfall in the Yucatán Peninsula as a Category 5 hurricane
- Hurricane Franklin (2017) – Category 1 hurricane that struck Veracruz and the Yucatán Peninsula
- Hurricane Katia (2017) – struck Veracruz one month after Franklin as a Category 1 hurricane
