= Multi-Terrain Pattern =

Camouflage pattern of the British Armed Forces

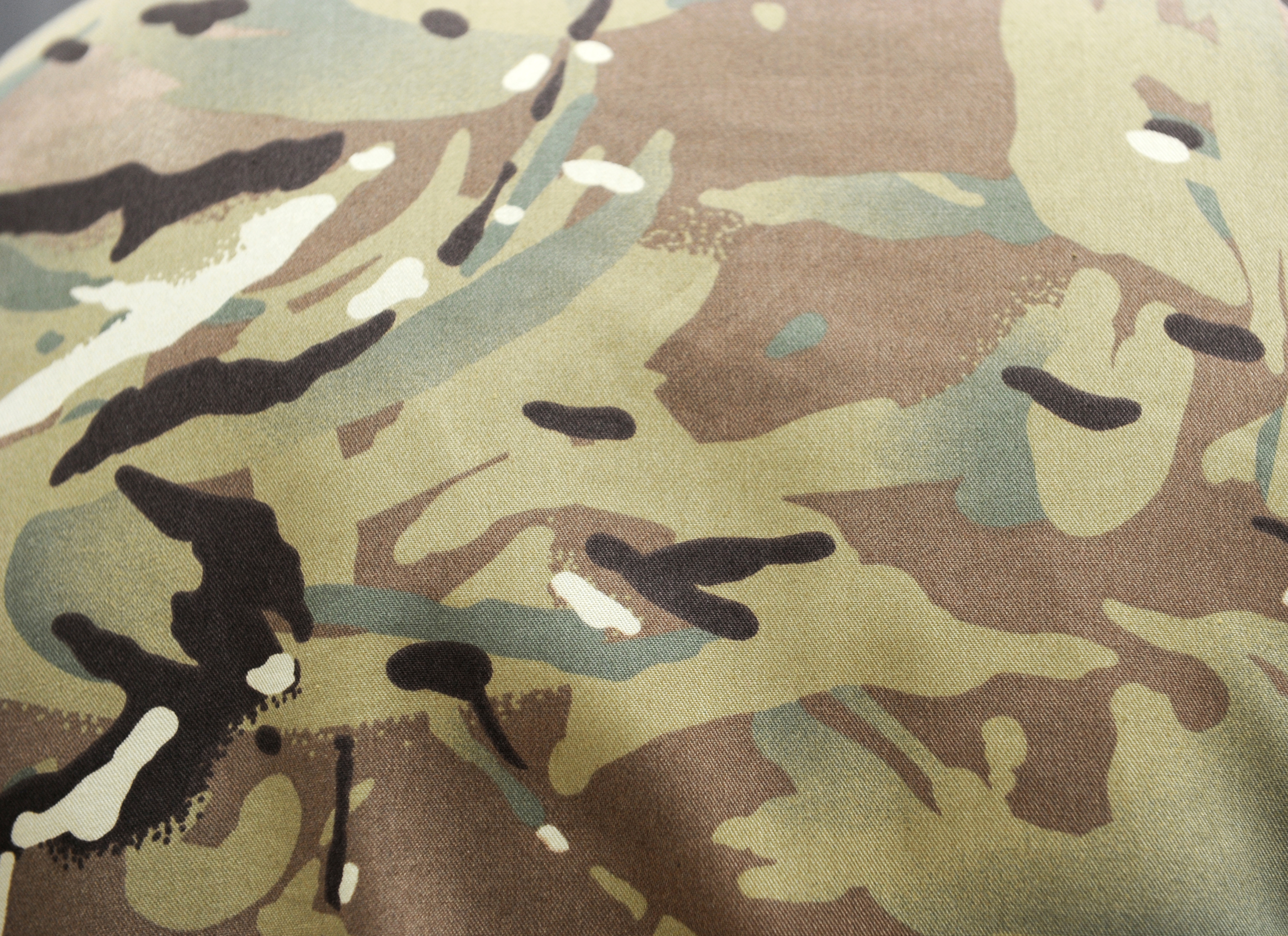
- Multi-Terrain Pattern fabric
- Type: Military camouflage pattern
- Place of origin: United Kingdom

Service history
- In service: March 2010 – present
- Used by: See Users
- Wars: War in Afghanistan; Iraq War; Russo-Ukrainian War

Production history
- Designer: Defence Science and Technology Laboratory
- Designed: 2002
- Produced: 2010–present

Multi-Terrain Pattern (MTP) is the standard camouflage pattern of the British Armed Forces. It is a modified version of Crye's Multicam pattern using the same colour palette but with shapes that resemble the UK's previous DPM pattern.

As part of the British Ministry of Defence's (MOD) Personal Equipment and Common Operational Clothing (PECOC) programme, three new camouflage patterns were considered for issue to British forces. These were a revised temperate Disruptive Pattern Material (DPM) using lighter colours, a new three-colour desert pattern with enhanced utility for night-time operations, and a hybrid four colour scheme using two colours from each of the previous patterns for use on webbing in all terrains.

== History ==
Following an Urgent Operational Requirement for a camouflage uniform for the Afghan theatre of operations, and the success of a commercially available pattern (Crye's MultiCam) when tested in trials, a decision was made to use MultiCam as the basis of a new Multi-Terrain Pattern for British armed forces, replacing the previous temperate DPM uniforms. Desert DPM uniforms were to be retained but later entirely replaced alongside Woodland DPM.

In 2009, the United Kingdom's Ministry of Defence announced that HM Forces would be issued with the new British Army uniform for operations in Afghanistan with personnel serving under the 4th Mechanised Brigade. It was initially issued to personnel deployed on Operation Herrick from March 2010, then issued more widely to HM Forces from 2011 onwards. By 2013, it replaced all DPM camouflage, including Woodland and Desert variants of the Combat Soldier 95 uniform, along with the introduction of the new Personal Clothing System.

== Development ==
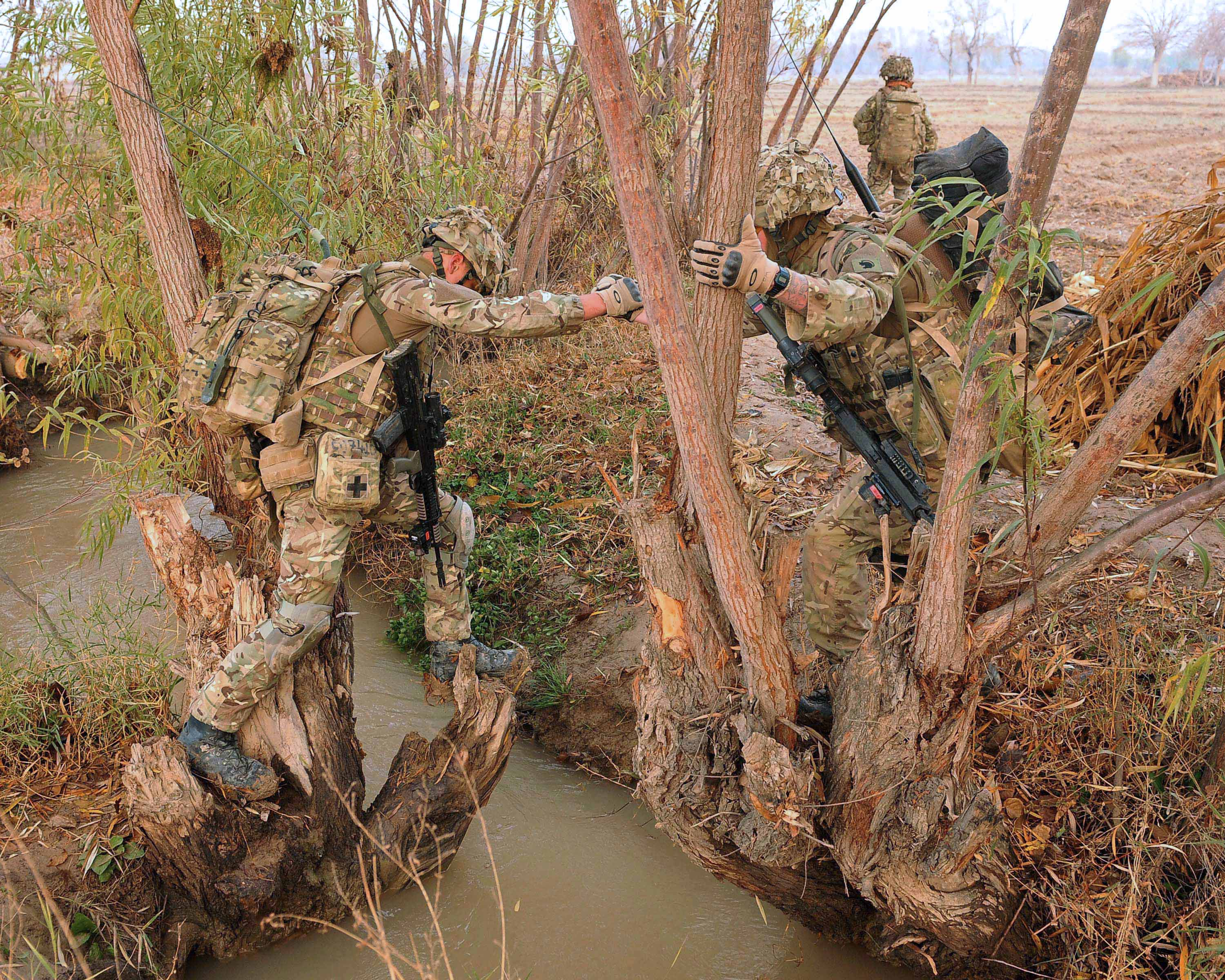
The MTP in the Afghanistan environment

The MTP camouflage design was intended to perform consistently across a wide range of environments encountered, particularly for operations that the military deployed in during 2009. Initial concept was made with the environment of Helmand Province in mind.

British Troops in Afghanistan operate in a mixed landscape, including desert, woodland, mountains and urban. The development team at the Defence Science and Technology Laboratory tested camouflage variations against the standard army disruptive pattern material and the desert DPM, to determine the best balance of colours. The current HM Armed Forces camouflage were then tested alongside off-the-shelf multi-terrain camouflage. The tests were against terrain that soldiers are likely to encounter across the landscape in Afghanistan.

A wide range of camouflage colours were tried in Britain, Cyprus, Kenya and Afghanistan. Camouflage patterns were compared with in-service and commercially available patterns—including those from Crye Precision in the United States. The trials included visual comparisons, objective assessments of the time to detect the different camouflage patterns against different backgrounds, and subjective user opinions on the efficacy of the performance.

Crye's Multicam pattern was determined to be the best performing, across the widest range of environments, by a significant margin, and was selected as the basis for the new British MTP camouflage, and modified with shapes that were closer to those of the existing British DPM pattern. Crye designed the new pattern for the UK's MOD, with the MOD holding the licence to print the pattern. The MTP pattern itself was not tried against other patterns and its adoption was based solely on its similarity to the original Crye Multicam pattern.

In 2019, a variant of the MTP camouflage pattern was selected by the New Zealand Defence Force to replace the MCU camouflage across all services by 2023. Designated NZMTP, the new camouflage has a modified colour palette better suited to New Zealand's landscape.

In June 2020, the UK's Royal Marines announced that they would be procuring new uniforms specifically for the Marines, taking them away from the standard PCS uniforms of the UK forces. The camouflage pattern would be in Crye's Multicam, not the UK's MTP. The uniform is the off-the-shelf G4 system not sold in MTP, as Crye had sold the sole production rights for MTP to the UK.

== Users ==
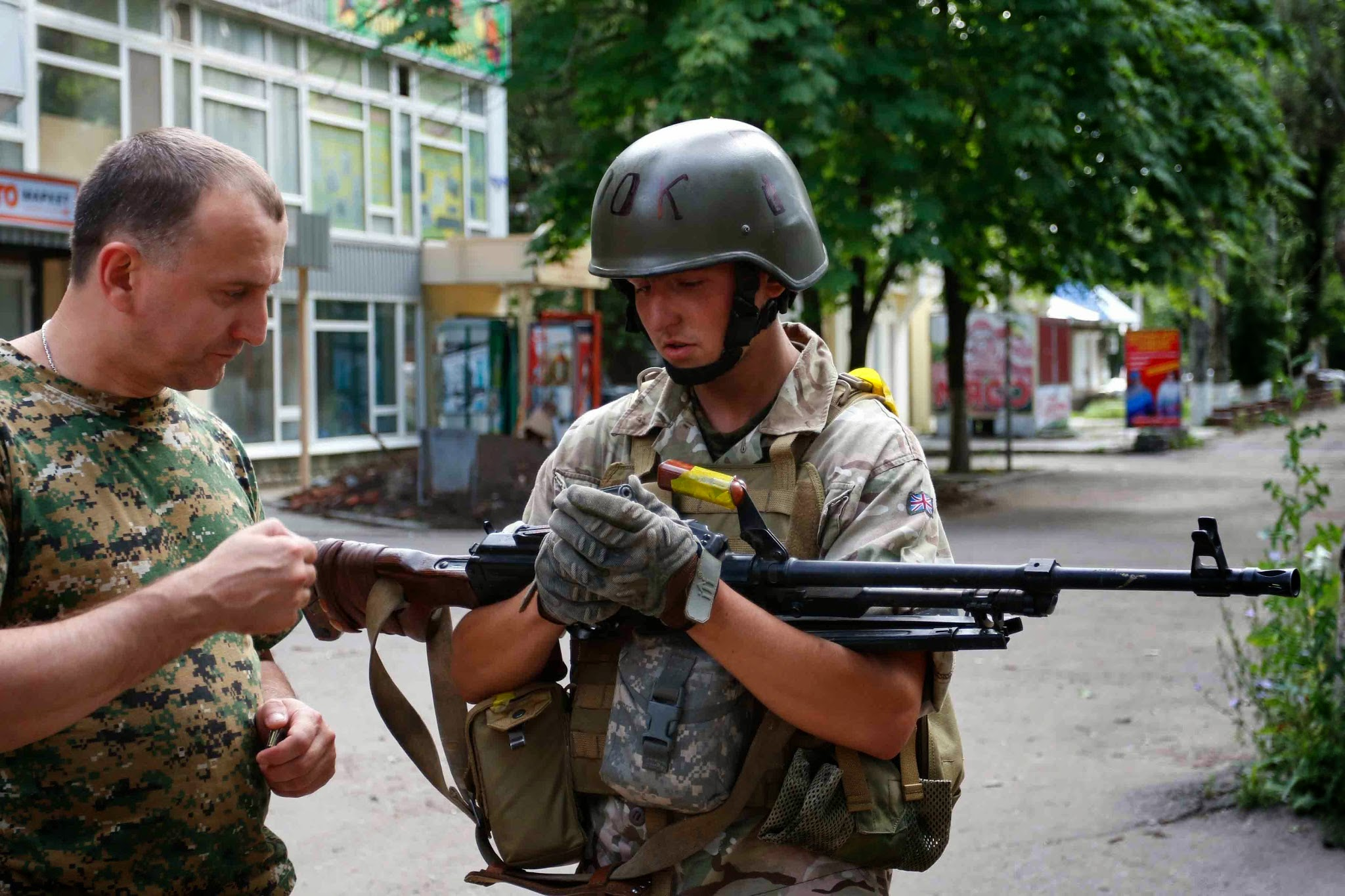
- A Ukrainian soldier wearing British-donated surplus MTP fatigues during the Donbas war. The stitched British flag can still be seen on the shoulder sleeve
  Bahrain: Reported to be used by Bahraini special forces commandos.
- Denmark: Frogman Corps Is known for using MTP uniforms. And have been observed in TV documentaries.
- Malta: Standard uniform of the Armed Forces of Malta since 2014.
- New Zealand: New Zealand Defence Force: NZMTP to replace current service Multi Terrain Camouflage Pattern (MCU) by 2023
- Pakistan: Special Service Group new standard issue CCD.
- Tonga: His Majesty's Armed Forces (Tonga).
- United Kingdom: Standard issue battlefield dress of the British Armed Forces and the Cadet Forces.
  - Bermuda: Royal Bermuda Regiment, Royal Bermuda Regiment Junior Leaders.
  - Cayman Islands: Cayman Islands Regiment, Cayman Islands Cadet Corps.
  - Falkland Islands: Falkland Islands Defence Force.
  - Montserrat: Royal Montserrat Defence Force.
- Ukraine: Ukrainian troops reported to be using them.
