= Corps Warrant =

The Corps Warrant is the official list of those British military units (not to be confused with naval forces) that are considered part of the British Army (as not all British military units have been, or are, considered to be). The Corps Warrant is updated periodically to reflect changes in the make-up of the army.

Her Majesty the Queen of the United Kingdom and its Overseas Territories is empowered to declare by Royal Warrant, what bodies of the Military Forces are Corps for the purposes of the Army Act (enlistment, etc.) the Reserve Forces Act, 1882, and the Territorial and Reserve Forces Act, 1907. Corps and Regiments are not listed on the Corps Warrant according to their order in the British Army order-of-precedence.

- Corps Warrant, 1926
- Corps Warrant, 1951
