= Crime in the Cayman Islands =

Crime in the Cayman Islands has remained low since first being recorded. Murders are rare and gang activity is very uncommon. The British Overseas Territory is known for being one of the safest jurisdictions in the Caribbean and the world, with the island nation having lower crime rates than many US states.

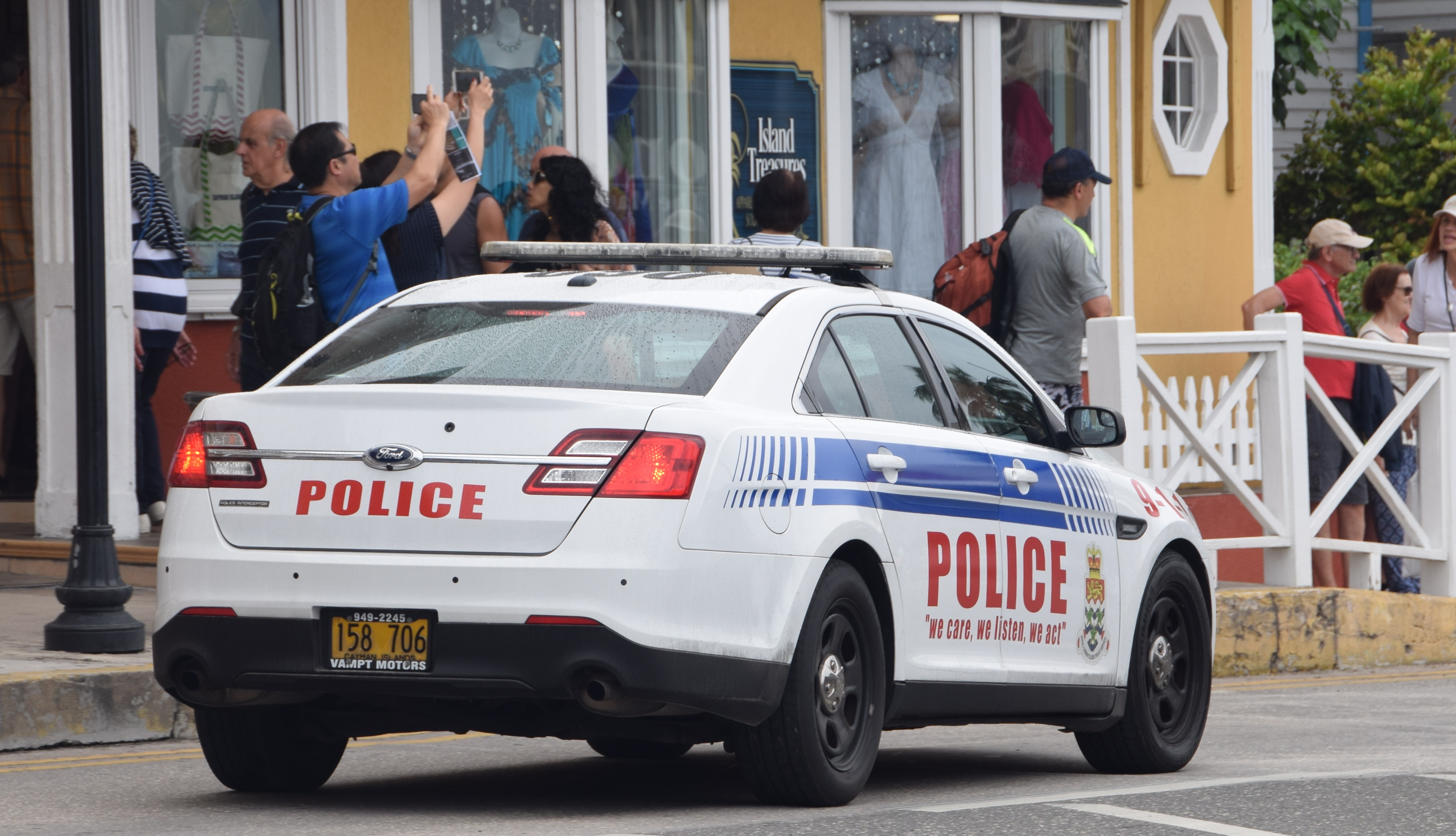
Police car in George Town

People are advised to take caution in areas where petty crime is known to occur, such as downtown George Town and parts of West Bay. It is rare to be the victim of a serious crime, but pickpocketing and muggings are possible but rare.

In 2010, the homicide rate in the Cayman Islands was 15.88 per 100,000 people. It decreased to 8.22 per 100,000 people in 2014. The homicide rate further decreased to 7.99 per 100,000 people in 2022, and to 5.6 per 100,000 people in 2023.

== Recent reports ==
In 2023, it was reported that the Cayman Islands had a homicide rate of 5.6 per 100,000 people. There were 4 murders that year, and because of the small population, crime rates appear inflated to the reality of the situation.

On the 25 February 2024, a mass shooting occurred during a football game at the Ed Bush Stadium in West Bay where upwards of 7 people were shot. This event shocked the Cayman Islands as an incident of this magnitude was almost unheard of as gang crime rarely spills over into the public domain. The Royal Cayman Islands Police Service said they assume this occurred due to heightened tensions between rival gangs in George Town and West Bay.

== See also ==
- Royal Cayman Islands Police Service
