= Royal Cayman Islands Police Service =

Agency overview
- Formed: 1907
- Employees: 407

Jurisdictional structure
- Operations jurisdiction: Cayman Islands
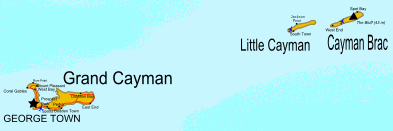
- Map of Royal Cayman Islands Police Service's jurisdiction
- Area: 102 square miles
- Population: 69,656
- General nature: Local civilian police

Operational structure
- Headquarters: George Town
- Constables: 343
- Agency executive: Kurt Walton, Commissioner

Facilities
- Stations: 7

Website
- www.rcips.ky

The Royal Cayman Islands Police Service (RCIPS) is the standing police force of the British Overseas Territory of the Cayman Islands.

== History ==
The police force was formed in 1907 and currently (2009) stands at 343 enlisted officers, tasked with tackling Crime in the Cayman Islands.

== Jurisdiction ==
The Royal Cayman Islands Police Service serves all three of the Cayman Islands, namely, Grand Cayman, Cayman Brac and Little Cayman.

Demographically, the 2021 census reported the population of the Cayman Islands to be 69,656, representing a mix of more than 100 nationalities.

The vast majority of people reside on Grand Cayman with Cayman Brac being the second most populated with about 2,000 residents, followed by Little Cayman with around 200 permanent residents.

Against this backdrop the RCIPS deals with more than 22,000 calls for assistance every year, as well as proactively patrolling the streets 24-hours a day, seven days a week.

It has a history of actively recruiting police officers from other nations with at least five years' experience.

== Structure and ranks ==
The RCIPS is headed by a Commissioner, assisted by up to two Deputy Commissioners. Other executive officers hold the ranks of Chief Superintendent and Superintendent.

Each of the four policing Districts is headed by a Chief Inspector, assisted by an Inspector (except in the smallest District, which covers the two smaller islands). Inspectors are responsible for neighbourhood teams consisting of Sergeants and Constables.

In addition to neighbourhood policing, officers are assigned to the Criminal Investigation Department (CID) with ranks (up to Chief Superintendent) prefixed with the word 'Detective'. There are also a number of specialist units.

The RCIPS engages Special Constables (“Specials”), who are unpaid volunteer police officers, to support the work of full-time officers. There are powers to appoint Auxiliary Constables to specialist roles. Special Constables may advance to the rank of Special Sergeant, and also have their own Commandant, with a Deputy and an Assistant.

The prefix “detective” is given to officers who are assigned to the CID, after completing the necessary selection and training process. Detective ranks run parallel to uniformed ranks, and range from Detective Constable to Detective Superintendent.

Ranks and Insignia of the Royal Cayman Islands Police Service
Rank	Commissioner	Deputy Commissioner	Assistant Commissioner	Chief Superintendent	Superintendent	Chief Inspector	Inspector	Sergeant	Constable
Epaulette insignia									

Other

- Auxiliary Constable
- Special Constable
- Recruit

== Police Districts ==
For purposes of criminal investigation, neighbourhood policing, and crime prevention, the RCIPS is divided into four Districts:

- West Bay, with one police station at West Bay.
- George Town, with one police station at George Town (Elgin Avenue).
- Eastern District, with three police stations at East End, Bodden Town, and North Side.
- Cayman Brac and Little Cayman, with two police stations, one on each island.

In addition to the Elgin Avenue police station in George Town, several other operational police bases exist in the town, including the national police headquarters in Shedden Road, the traffic policing unit in Lindhurst Avenue, and administrative offices on Walkers Road.

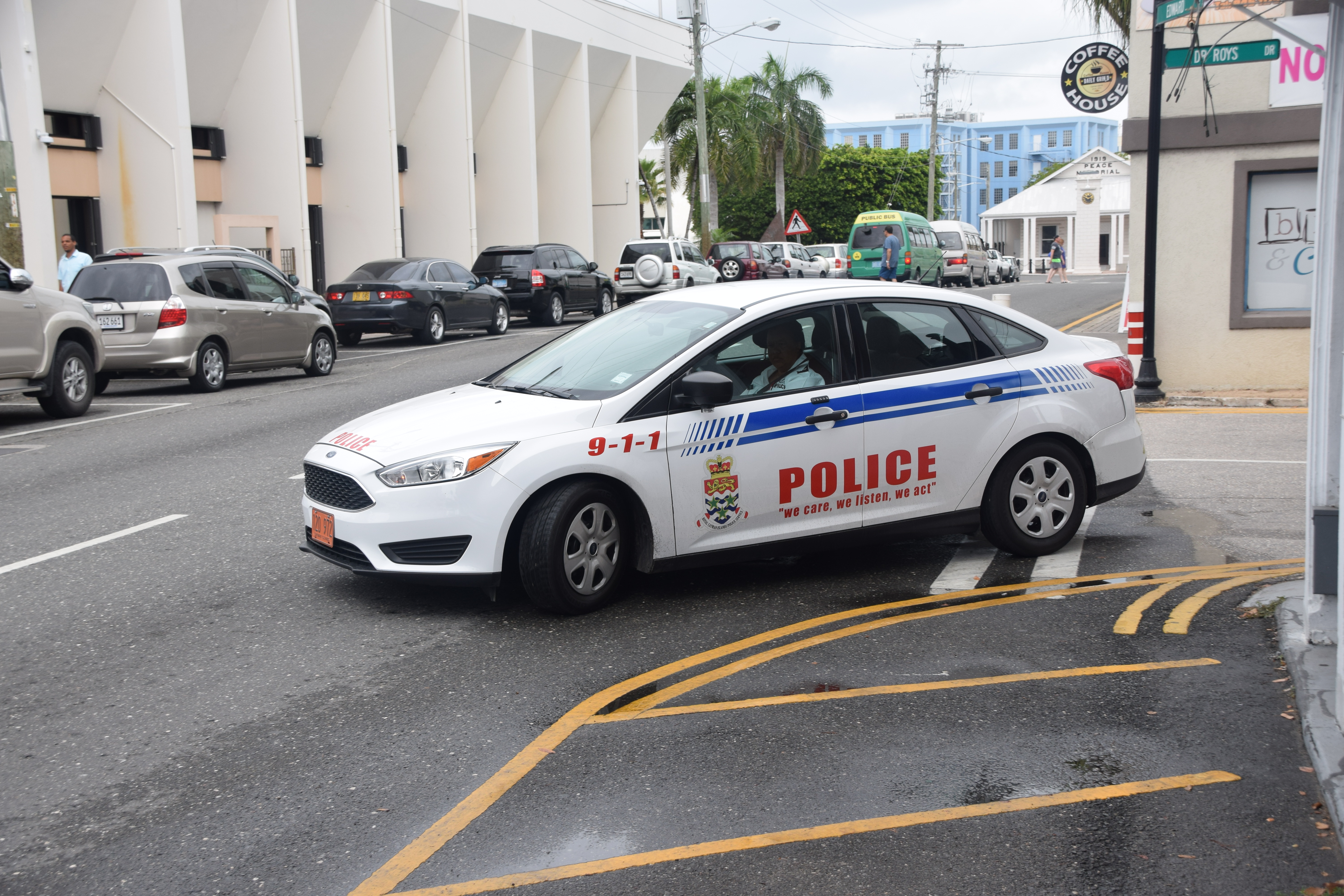
RCIPS Police car

== Specialist departments ==
The RCIPS has a number of specialist departments, beyond the CID and the neighbourhood policing teams. Of these, the most visible and sizeable are the following.

=== Air Operations Unit ===
The Air Operations Unit (AOU) provides aerial support for border security, search and rescue, medical evacuations, patient transport from the Sister Islands, police operations, and disaster response.

The AOU has one Inspector as Head Of Air Operations, along with a Sergeant as the Deputy Head Of Air Operations, and is staffed by professional pilots, engineers, as well as tactical flight officers in the form of (police officers), the AOU was founded in 2010.

The AOU started with a Eurocopter EC135 police helicopter. This original aircraft was withdrawn after a failure in service in February 2019. The AOU now operates two Airbus Helicopters, Inc. H145 helicopters.

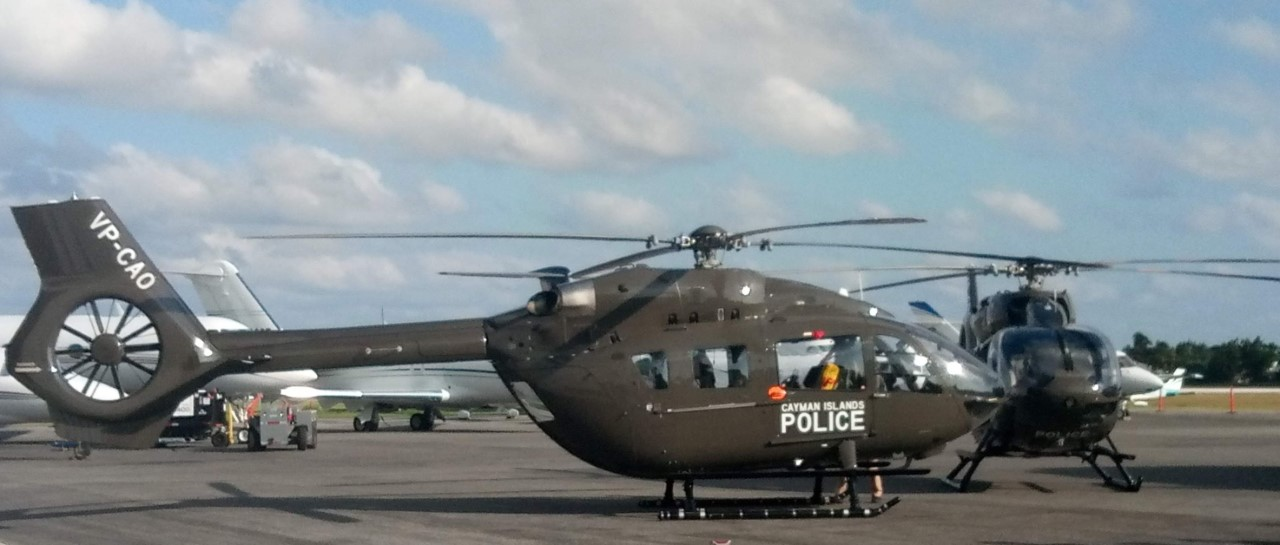
Two Cayman Islands Police Service H145 Helicopters Tail numbers VP-CAO and VP-CPS

The AOU now operates two Airbus H-145 helicopters (formerly the Eurocopter EC-145), acquired in a special deal with the United Kingdom in late March 2019, and early December 2019.

Type	Tail No.	Origin	Aircraft Manufacture	In service	Notes
Current Aircraft
H145	VP-CAO	United States	Airbus Helicopters, Inc.	2019-Current	
H145	VP-CPS	United States	Airbus Helicopters, Inc.	2019-Current	
Former Aircraft
EC135	VP-CPS	France	Eurocopter Airbus Helicopters	2010–2019	

=== Joint Marine Unit ===
The Joint Marine Unit played the role of the Coast Guard for the Caymand Islands.

This unit has been replaced by the CICG in 2020 which operate a fleet of fast motor boats to provide law enforcement, maritime customs control, maritime immigration control, and search and rescue operations.

=== K-9 unit ===
K-9 officers are equipped with tactical plate carriers and relevant equipment for their dogs along with the standard gear.

The K-9 Unit normally operate with Malinois or German Shepherds dogs.

=== Firearms Response Unit ===
The FRU is a paramilitary force within the RCIPS, whose officers are trained to high standards of fitness, and to an advanced level of firearms training to provide operational support as required.

== Equipment ==
=== Uniform ===
A regular uniformed police officer would carry a duty belt with handcuffs, pepper spray, and collapsible baton, and radio, at time wears a stab vest.

An Air Operations Unit Officer's uniform before would have normally consisted of Hi-Vis Yellow with black and reflective grey striped polo and dark blue tactical trousers and boots and a coyote tan flight suit.

In more recent years the AOU has been using dark blue polo shirts and tactical coyote tan trousers and boots, along with relevant gear for pilots and air crew.

In many cases officers in Criminal Investigations are plain clothed officers and would typically wear clothes that would be suited for professional business.

A K-9 Officer's uniform is the same tactical dark blue/black that the FRU had used prior to 2022.

As of June 2022, FRU updated their uniform from the tactical dark bue/black which resembles some of the uniforms of other unit in the service like K-9 as well as other agencies like the Cayman Islands Coast Guard and CBC, to a tactical grey uniform which would distinguish the FRU from any other unit or agency.

Along with the new uniform the FRU also updated to a newer type of plate carrier and ballistic helmet.

The tactical grey uniform is similar to others for specialist tactical units in other countries like Canada's Emergency Task Force and United Kingdom's Counter Terrorist Specialist Firearms Officer of the Metropolitan Police Specialist Firearms Command (SCO19).

=== Firearms ===
The Royal Cayman Islands Police Service in majority is an unarmed police service.

Model	Origin	Type
Taser X26	United States	Electroshock weapon
Springfield Armory XD	United States	Semi-automatic pistol
Heckler & Koch MP5	Germany	Submachine gun
H&K G36C	Germany	Assault rifle
SIG Sauer SIG516	United States	Assault rifle

=== Vehicles ===
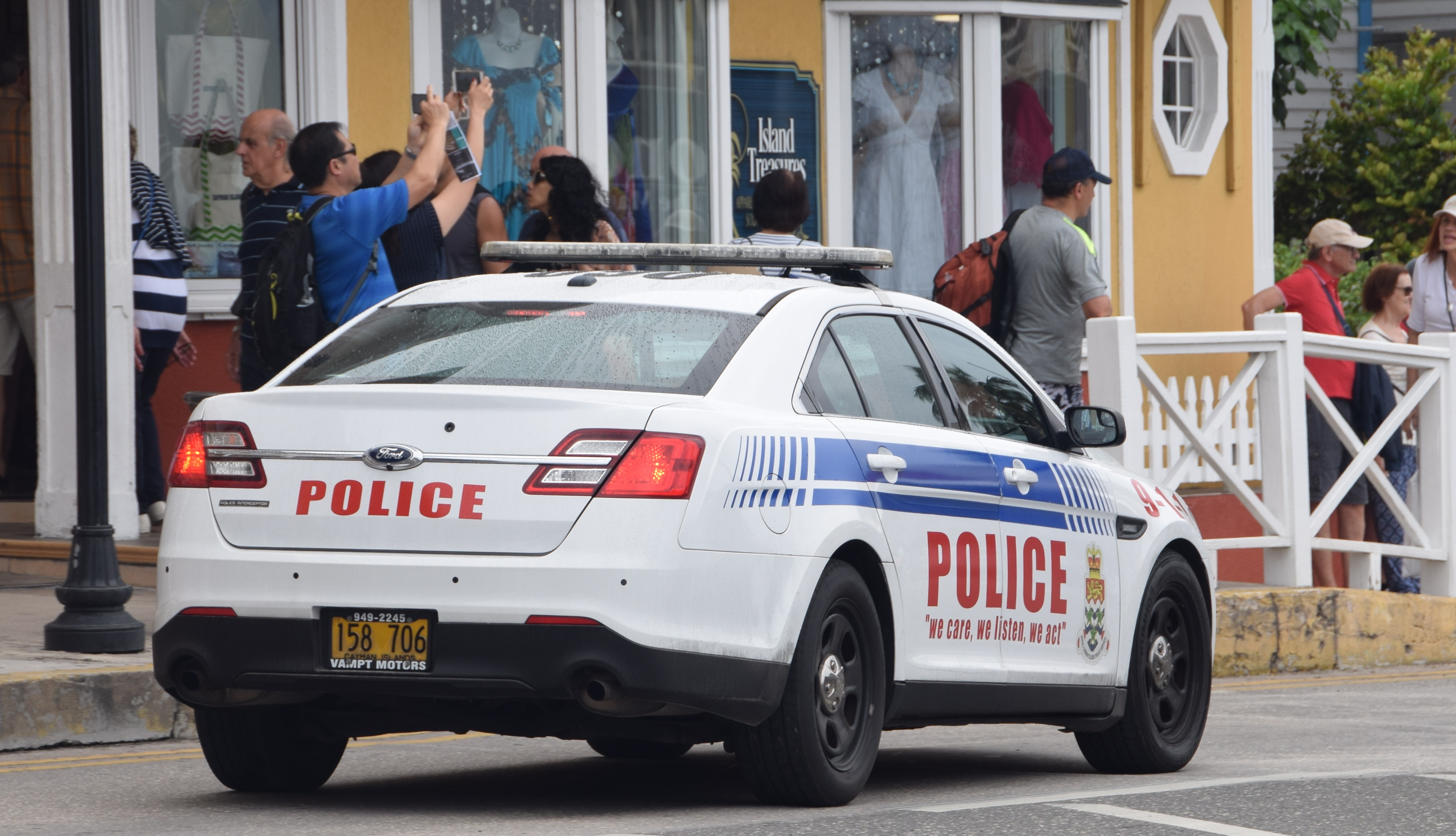
A Ford Taurus Police Interceptor in service of RCIPS

- Ford Police Interceptor Sedan Taurus
- Ford Crown Victoria Police Interceptor
- Chevrolet Impala
- Dodge Charger Pursuit
- Ford Police Interceptor Utility Explorer
- Chevrolet Tahoe
- Land Rover Discovery
- Mercedes-Benz Sprinter
- Ford F-Series
- Eco Charger E-ATV

=== Others ===
Crime Scene Investigation Unit (CSIU) personnel have the relevant forensic gear to carry out their work.
