= Overseas military bases of the United Kingdom =

British Overseas Bases

Overseas military bases of the United Kingdom enable the British Armed Forces to conduct expeditionary warfare and maintain a forward presence. Bases tend to be located in or near areas of strategic or diplomatic importance, often used for the build-up or resupply of military forces, as was seen during the 1982 Falklands War with the use of RAF Ascension Island as a staging post. Most of the bases are located on British Overseas Territories or former colonies which retain close diplomatic ties with the British government.

Apart from the main operating bases, the British military has personnel stationed at approximately 145 overseas military installations located across 42 countries. Most of these are small contingents. However, some sixty facilities are run directly by the British Armed Forces, including seventeen installations in Cyprus. Allied countries host British military personnel in some sixty-nine facilities, including in Oman, at sixteen locations.

A number of British military operations have relied heavily on the strategic island of Diego Garcia in the Chagos Islands. It has been used for major operations during the war on terror, Operation Granby (1991), Operation Herrick (2001–2014), Operation Telic (2003–2011), Operation Shader (2014–present), Operation Desert Storm (1991), Operation Desert Fox (1998), Operation Enduring Freedom (2001–14), Operation Iraqi Freedom (2003–11), and Operation Inherent Resolve (2014–present).

== Overview ==
Whilst the Ministry of Defence has publicly stated that the British Armed Forces only operates military bases in the UK, the United States, Cyprus, Gibraltar and the South Atlantic, a November 2020 report by Declassified UK journalist Phil Miller revealed that there were in fact a total of 145 military sites that spanned all seven continents. These figures were revealed in the wake of UK Prime Minister Boris Johnson announcing a £16.5 billion increase in the country's defence budget.

The 145 sites include 60 which the UK operates itself, as well as a further 85 run by British allies. According to Miller, these appear to fit the description of what Mark Carleton-Smith, the Chief of the General Staff, referred to as "lily pads", i.e. sites which the British Armed Forces have easy access to as and when they are required.

== Facilities by continent ==
=== Africa ===
In Africa, there are five bases/training facilities in Kenya, including the Kifaru Camp, which is part of the BATUK at the Kahawa Barracks in Nairobi.

In the Chagos Islands, the British and American military jointly operate the Naval Support Facility Diego Garcia. The command's mission is "[t]o provide logistic support to operational forces forward deployed to the Indian Ocean and Persian Gulf AORs in support of national policy objectives." The facility started construction in 1971 and was complete by 1976, becoming operational the very same year. Despite the fact that it is technically owned by the Ministry of Defence, the facility is primarily occupied by U.S. Navy and Royal Navy elements.

=== Asia ===
There are several sites in Asia where British military personnel have been reported to be present. Most of these are in the Arab states of the Persian Gulf, like in Oman, which has sixteen of them. There are two sites in the United Arab Emirates and one main base, the United Kingdom Naval Support Facility, in Bahrain.

In Sembawang of Singapore, there is British Defence Singapore Support Unit which is operated by Royal Navy and could be positioned as the logistic centre and supporting base of British Armed Forces in Southeast Asia, East Asia and Oceania. Brunei hosts one battalion of the Royal Gurkha Regiment and a supporting helicopter unit.

=== Oceania ===
Australia is host to four sites where British personnel are present: the Wyndham aerodrome in Western Australia, Williamtown in New South Wales, Woomera and Mawson Lakes, both in South Australia. According to a Declassified UK report, the British military also has around 60 personnel stationed across the country. Around 25 of these hold defence attaché roles in the British High Commission in Canberra and at Australian Defence Department sites near the capital, such as the Headquarters Joint Operations Command at Bungendore.

A further ten British military personnel are based at unspecified locations in New Zealand. Parliamentary data from 2014 showed their roles included working as navigators on a P-3K Orion aircraft, which is operated by the Royal New Zealand Air Force.

=== Europe ===
The British military operates seventeen military facilities in two 'sovereign base areas' on Cyprus, Akrotiri and Dhekelia, which are host to 2,290 British personnel. There are also four bases in Germany and one each in Gibraltar, Jersey, Lithuania, Estonia, Czech Republic and Norway, with the Norwegian base opening most recently, in 2023.

=== The Americas ===
The British military has personnel present in six U.S. states including California (Edwards Air Force Base), Nevada (Creech Air Force Base) and South Carolina (MCAS Beaufort).

As British Overseas Territories, the Turks and Caicos Islands, Montserrat, Bermuda and the Cayman Islands have all established locally-recruited units which are reserve components of the British Army. The most recently established of these is the Turks and Caicos Islands Regiment, which was officially raised in April 2020.

RAF Mount Pleasant is the largest of six sites in the Falkland Islands, which is the only territory in South America with British military personnel. Mount Pleasant is supplied from a dockyard at Mare Harbour. The islands are monitored by three radar sites at Mount Alice, Byron Heights and Mount Kent, respectively.

== Significant overseas military deployments ==
Map of current military installations

The British Armed Forces maintain a number of larger garrisons and military facilities around the world:

Location	Details	Ref.
Ascension Island	RAF Ascension: The RAF maintains an airbase on Ascension Island; notable for use as a staging post during the 1982 Falklands War. The territory is also the site of a joint UK-US signals intelligence facility.	
Bahrain	HMS Jufair: Britain's return East of Suez was marked with the establishment of a large Naval Support Facility. Officially opened in 2018, at the Bahraini port of Mina Salman, the base can support vessels up to the size of aircraft carriers. Bahrain is also home to the UK Maritime Component Command, which supports Royal Navy mine countermeasures vessels deployed in the Middle East.	
Belize	British Army Training and Support Unit Belize (BATSUB): Used primarily for jungle warfare training, with access to 5,000 square miles (13,000 km^{2}) of jungle terrain. Although British facilities were mothballed in the Strategic Defence and Security Review 2010, 12 personnel remain on station at BATSUB together with 100 locally-recruited civilian personnel.	
British Indian Ocean Territory	British Forces British Indian Ocean Territories (BFBIOT): A Permanent Joint Operating Base. Although the Naval Support Facility Diego Garcia and airbase facilities on Diego Garcia are leased to the United States, the UK retains ownership and continual access. The small but permanent British garrison, known as Naval Party 1002, forms the civil administration on this British Overseas Territory.	
Brunei	British Forces Brunei: A garrison made up of one battalion from the Royal Gurkha Rifles and No. 1563 Flight RAF. Established in 1959, it also hosts routine jungle warfare courses for the British Army and Royal Marines.	
Canada	British Army Training Unit Suffield (BATUS): Home to a large contingent of in-service British Army vehicles, such as the Challenger 2 and Warrior IFV. It is the British Army's largest armoured warfare training facility, training up-to five battlegroups, each consisting of 1,400 personnel, every year.	
Cyprus	British Forces Cyprus: A Permanent Joint Operating Base, with significant garrisons in Akrotiri and Dhekelia, including RAF Akrotiri, the joint signals intelligence stations RAF Troodos and Ayios Nikolaos, and facilities to support two resident infantry battalions and supporting British Army units.	
Falkland Islands	British Forces South Atlantic Islands (BFSAI): A Permanent Joint Operating Base. The British garrison is centred around RAF Mount Pleasant (the Mount Pleasant Complex) and includes commitments from all branches of the British Armed Forces, most notably; No. 1435 Flight RAF (4 x Typhoon FGR4), No. 1312 Flight RAF (one Voyager and one Airbus A400M Atlas), HMS Forth, and 1,000 British Army personnel. There are also early-warning and airspace-control radar stations at critical locations, and East Cove Military Port, a deep-water port operated by Naval Party 2010.	
NATO: Germany, Estonia and Poland	British Army Germany: Home of the 23 Amphibious Engineer Squadron and other supporting elements, as well as depots and the Alpine Training Centre Hubertushaus in Oberstdorf. NATO Enhanced Forward Presence: The UK contributes about 900 personnel (armour and armoured infantry) to a multi-national NATO battlegroup in Estonia, and an additional light armoured squadron group to NATO forces in Poland	
Gibraltar	British Forces Gibraltar: A Permanent Joint Operating Base. Britain has maintained a military presence in Gibraltar since its capture (1704) and the subsequent Treaty of Utrecht (1713). Facilities include (but are not limited to) the airbase RAF Gibraltar and the Port of Gibraltar.	
Kenya	British Army Training Unit Kenya (BATUK): Used primarily for the training of British infantry battalions in the arid and rugged terrain of the Great Rift Valley. Routine Royal Engineers and Royal Army Medical Corps exercises also carry out civil engineering projects and health care assistance to the local communities.	
Nepal	British Gurkhas Nepal: The British Army maintains a small outpost in Nepal for recruitment purposes to the Brigade of Gurkhas.	
Norway	Camp Viking: Approximately 1,000 personnel from the Royal Navy's Littoral Response Group (North) to respond to emerging crises in Europe.	
Oman	UK Joint Logistics Support Base: A military logistics centre and training facility in Duqm that will have a dry dock and be able to accommodate submarines and Queen Elizabeth-class aircraft carriers. It is hoped to be linked to other Persian Gulf countries by the Gulf Railway. Additionally, a permanent British Army presence is maintained at the Omani-British Joint Training Area which opened in 2019.	
Qatar	RAF Al Udeid: An outpost at Al Udeid Air Base serving as the headquarters for No. 83 Expeditionary Air Group and its operations across the Middle East.	
Singapore	British Defence Singapore Support Unit (BDSSU): A Royal Navy repair and logistics support facility at Sembawang wharf in support of the Five Power Defence Arrangements.	
United Arab Emirates	Donnelly Lines: An "expansive" facility opened in March 2024, located within Al Minhad Air Base.	

== Locally raised units of British Overseas Territories ==
Map of locally raised units

Six British Overseas Territories also maintain their own locally raised units for home defence and security:

Location	Details	Official website
Bermuda	The Royal Bermuda Regiment: Formed in 1965.	www.bermudaregiment.bm
Cayman Islands	Cayman Islands Regiment: Formed in 2019.	www.rcips.ky/cayman-islands-regiment-reservist
Falkland Islands	Falkland Islands Defence Force: Traces its origins back to 1847. The force consists of one light infantry company and trains once per week. It is manned entirely by the local population, following British Army doctrine, training and operations.	www.fig.gov.fk/fidf
Gibraltar	Royal Gibraltar Regiment: Raised in 1943. The regiment consists of one infantry battalion (1 × HQ company and 3 × infantry companies) and dispatches members to take part in British conflicts overseas.	royalgibraltarregiment.gi
Montserrat	Royal Montserrat Defence Force: Raised in 1899.	https://www.gov.ms/?s=Royal+Montserrat+Defence+Force
Turks and Caicos Islands	Turks and Caicos Islands Regiment: Raised in 2020.	https://www.gov.tc/government

== See also ==
- Power projection
- List of countries with overseas military bases
- List of Royal Navy shore establishments
- List of British Army installations
- List of Royal Air Force stations
- List of United States military bases
