= Cayman Islands Coast Guard =

Maritime rescue service covering the Cayman Islands

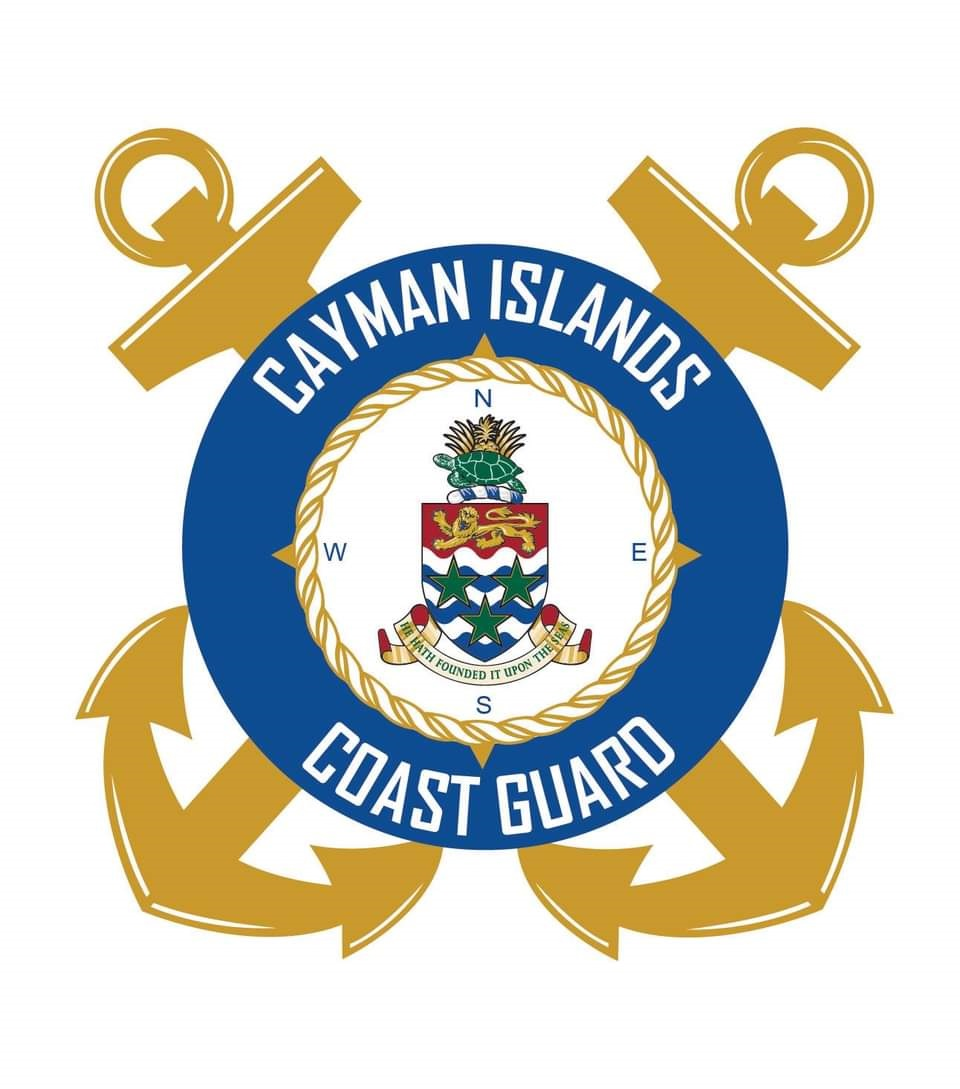
- Cayman Islands Coast Guard Crest
- Abbreviation: CICG
- Motto: To Save Lives & Protect Our Borders

Jurisdictional structure
- Operations jurisdiction: Cayman Islands
- Constituting instrument: Cayman Islands Coast Guard Bill, 2021
- Specialist jurisdiction: Coastal patrol, marine border protection, marine search and rescue

Operational structure
- Headquarters: 1101 Hirst Rd, Savannah, Grand Cayman, Cayman Islands
- Elected officers responsible: Jane Owen, Governor of the Cayman Islands; Burnie Bush, Minister of Home Affairs
- Agency executives: Robert Scotland, Commander; Leo Anglin, Lieutenant Commander

The Cayman Islands Coast Guard is the maritime security and search and rescue agency of the British Overseas Territory of the Cayman Islands. It was formed in late 2018 under the umbrella of the Royal Cayman Islands Police Service and was officially made as its own entity in 2021.

== History ==
In 2018, the People's Progressive Movement-led coalition government pledged to form a Coast Guard to protect the interests of the Islands, especially in terms of illegal immigration and illegal drug importation as well as Search and Rescue. In mid-2018, the commander and second-in-command of the Cayman Islands Coast Guard were appointed. The first commanding officer appointed was Commander Robert Scotland and the second-in-command appointed was Lieutenant Commander Leo Anglin. In mid-2019, the commander and second-in-command took part in Operation Riptide, an international joint operation with the United States Coast Guard and the Jamaica Defense Force Coast Guard. This was the first deployment of the Cayman Islands Coast Guard and the first counternarcotic deployment of a Cayman Islands representative on a foreign military ship in 10 years.

In late November 2019, it was announced that the Cayman Islands Coast Guard would become operational in January 2020, with initial total of 21 Coast Guardsman, half of which would come from the joint marine unit, with further recruitment in the new year.

The legislation to establish the Cayman Islands Coast Guard was gazetted in 2021, after which the Cayman Islands Coast Guard officially became its own entity separate from the Cayman Islands Police Service. Its first cohort of 16 recruits graduated in March 2021.

== Responsibilities ==
The Cayman Islands Coast Guard is responsible for maritime security, maritime enforcement of local laws and international laws in Cayman Islands waters, and compliance with conventions regarding safety at sea and pollution prevention.

== Structure ==
The Cayman Islands Coast Guard has two main operational departments:

- Coast Guard
- Coast Guard Reserve

Within these two department are four main detachments:

- Headquarters Detachment,
- Sea Detachment,
- Shore Detachment,
- Sister Islands Detachment.

== Commanding officers ==
As of September 2021, the commanding officer is Robert Scotland.

== Ranks ==
Ranks of the Cayman Islands Coast Guard are almost exactly the same as the ranks in the Royal Navy.

Commissioned Officers

NATO Code	OF-4	OF-3	OF-2	OF-1	OF-1
Cayman Islands Coast Guard Epaulette Rank Insignia
Rank Title:	Commander	Lieutenant commander	Lieutenant	Lieutenant (Junior Grade)	Sub-Lieutenant	Officer cadet
Abbreviation:	Cdr	Lt Cdr	Lt	Lt (JG)	Sub Lt / SLt	O/Cadet

Non-Commissioned Officers

NATO Code	OR-9	OR-7	OR-6	OR-5	OR-4	OR-2	OR-1	OR-0
Cayman Islands Coast Guard Rank Insignia							No Insignia
Rank Title:	Warrant Officer	Chief Petty Officer	Petty Officer		Leading seaman	Able seaman	Ordinary seaman	Coast Guard Recruit
Abbreviation:	WO	CPO	PO		LS	AB	OS	CGR

== Aviation ==
The Cayman Islands Coast Guard currently relies on the expertise of the Royal Cayman Islands Police Service Air Operations Unit, for aerial search capabilities.

Type	Tail No.	Origin	Aircraft Manufacture	In service	Notes
Aircraft
EC145	VP-CAO	United States	Airbus Helicopters, Inc.	2019-Current	
EC145	VP-CPS	United States	Airbus Helicopters, Inc.	2019-Current	

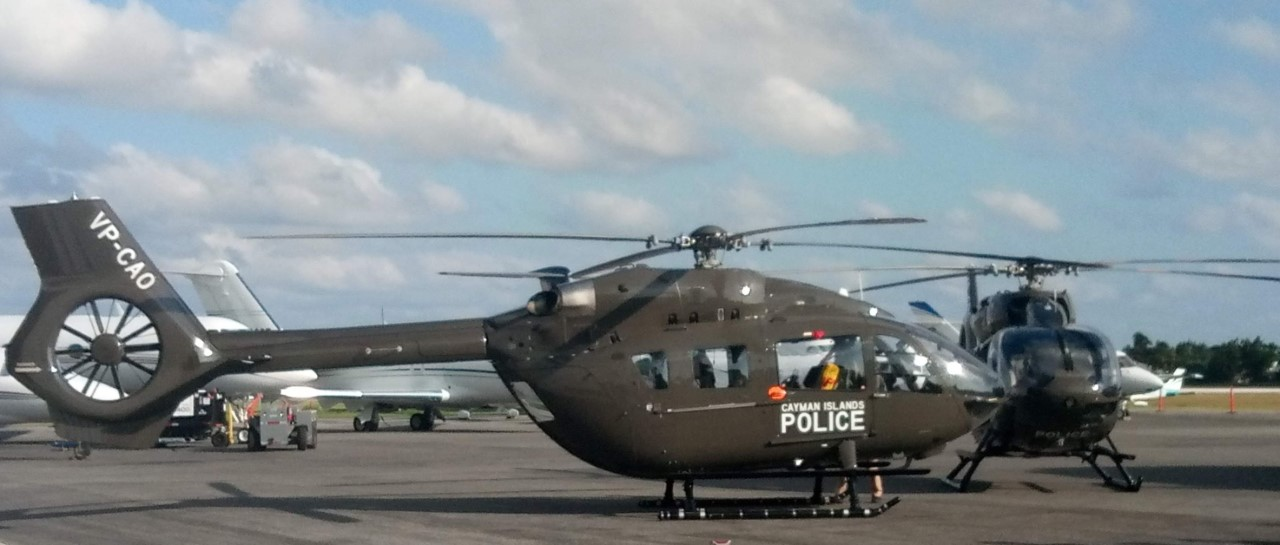
Two Cayman Islands Police Service H-145 Helicopters Tail numbers VP-CAO and VP-CPS

== Vehicles ==
The Cayman Islands Coast Guard has a few land based vehicles, including SUVs and trucks.

Name	Type	Origin	Manufacture	In service	Notes
Vehicles
Ford F550	Truck	United States	Ford Motor Company	2022-Current	2 in service

== See also ==
- Cayman Islands Regiment
- Royal Cayman Islands Police Service
- Her Majesty's Coastguard
- United States Coast Guard
- Jamaica Defence Force#JDF Coast Guard
