= Turks and Caicos Islands Regiment =

Home defence unit of the Turks and Caicos Islands

- Active: 2020–present
- Country: Turks and Caicos Islands; United Kingdom
- Branch: British Army
- Type: Line Infantry
- Role: Internal security, local and regional humanitarian operations, maritime security operations
- Size: Authorized strength: 6 officers and 40 part-time reserve personnel

Commanders
- Commanding officer: Lieutenant Colonel Ennis Grant
- Warrant Officer: WO2 Joel Richards
- Honorary Colonel: General Sir Patrick Sanders

Insignia
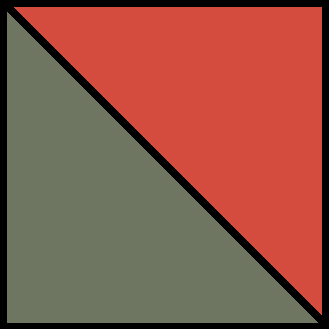
- Tactical Recognition Flash
- Abbreviation: TCIR

The Turks and Caicos Islands Regiment is the home defence unit of the British Overseas Territory of the Turks and Caicos Islands. It is a territorial infantry and engineer reserve unit of the British Armed Forces that was formed in 2020. The Regiment has an authorized strength level objective of 46 personnel, akin to that of a platoon-sized unit.

== Background ==
The Turks and Caicos Islands, as a British Overseas Territory, are defended by the United Kingdom.

== Structure ==
The TCI Regiment state that they are a Contingent Military Force and have three main functions:

1. Defence of the Islands
2. Disaster Relief and Humanitarian Assistance
3. Border Protection.

== History ==
Governor Nigel Dakin announced in early December 2019 that the Turks and Caicos was going to build its own defence regiment, the Turks and Caicos Regiment, with the assistance of the United Kingdom Ministry of Defence, similar to the Royal Bermuda Regiment, the Cayman Islands Regiment, the Royal Montserrat Defence Force, the Falkland Islands Defence Force, and the Royal Gibraltar Regiment. The Turks and Caicos Regiment, like the Royal Bermuda Regiment and the Cayman Islands Regiment, would focus on increasing the nation's security, and, in times of natural disasters, the regiment would be trained in engineering and communications. In mid-December 2019, a team from the United Kingdom Ministry of Defence was on Turks and Caicos to start building the regiment. It is projected that the Turk and Caicos Regiment will become operational sometime in the third quarter of 2020.

In spring 2020, a Security and Assistance Team from the United Kingdom Ministry of Defence arrived in Turks and Caicos to assist with the COVID-19 pandemic, the 2020 Atlantic hurricane season, and to help build the new Turks and Caicos Regiment.

In early June 2020, Lieutenant Colonel Ennis Grant was appointed as commanding officer of the new Turks and Caicos Regiment. An additional five permanent staff and forty reserve posts consisting of non-commissioned officers and marines will be recruited later in 2020.

Major John Galleymore was appointed as Second-in-Command of the Turks and Caicos Islands Regiment.

The first passing out parade occurred in summer 2021.

In late March 2023, General Sir Patrick Sanders, the British Army's Chief of the General Staff, visited the Caribbean on a number of meetings on British-Caribbean Defence. One of these stops was to the Turks & Caicos Islands, during his stop he met with the Governor, Premier, and the Turks & Caicos Islands Regiment. General Sir Patrick Sanders was made Honorary Colonel of the Turk & Caicos Islands Regiment. His visit was also joined by Brigadier The Rt. Hon. the Lord Lancaster of Kimbolton, the Honorary Colonel of the Cayman Islands Regiment.

== Commanding officers ==
As of January 2020, the commanding officer is Lieutenant Colonel Ennis Grant.

== Uniform ==
=== Cap Badge ===
The national challenges are represented in the Regiment's cap badge. Two symbols laid on top of one another. The Phoenix - a mythical bird that rises renewed and strengthened from the ashes of disaster, in Turks and Caicos Island’s case of natural disaster like Hurricanes, and the crossed Tridents representing the support the regiment will provide to the protection of maritime borders both on land and sea.

=== Clothing ===
Personnel wear standard British Army uniforms.

1. No. 1 Dress - similar in cut & style to The Rifles
2. No. 8 Combat Uniform - standard MTP uniform.

=== Ranks ===
Ranks of the Turks and Caicos Islands Regiment are exactly the same as the rest of the Royal Marines and British Army:

Commissioned officers

Rank group	General / flag officers	Senior officers		Junior officers
Turks and Caicos Islands Regiment
Turks and Caicos Islands Regiment		*Honorary Colonel	Lieutenant-colonel	Major	Captain	Lieutenant	Second lieutenant	Officer cadet

Non-commissioned officers

Rank group	Senior NCOs				Junior NCOs		Enlisted
Turks and Caicos Islands Regiment							No insignia
Turks and Caicos Islands Regiment	Warrant officer class 1	Warrant officer class 2	Colour sergeant	Sergeant	Corporal	Lance corporal	Marine

== Equipment ==
=== Rifles ===
Name	Origin	Type	Cartridge	Image	Details
Colt's M5 carbine	United States	Assault Rifle	5.56×45mm NATO		Adopted as the Standard issue assault rifle for Regiment Personnel.

=== Pistols ===
Name	Origin	Type	Cartridge	Image	Details
Glock 19 (L137A1)	Austria	Semi-automatic pistol	9×19mm Parabellum		Adopted as the new standard-issue sidearm pistol for Regiment Personnel.

=== Vehicles ===
Turks and Caicos Islands Regiment used the following vehicles as of 2025:

Name	Origin	Type	Number	Image	Details
Operational field Vehicles
Chevrolet Silverado Operations Truck	United States	Field Operation Vehicle	4		The modified Chevrolet Silverado trucks with the Z71 Off-Road Package has been obtained for the Turks and Caicos Islands Regiment.

== See also ==
- British Army Training and Support Unit Belize
- Overseas military bases of the United Kingdom
- British Armed Forces
- Royal Turks and Caicos Islands Police Force
