= Falkland Islands Defence Force =

Home defence unit of the Falkland Islands

- Badge of the Falkland Islands Defence Force
- Active: 1892–1920 (as the Falkland Islands Volunteer Corps); 1920–1982; 1983–present
- Country: Falkland Islands; United Kingdom
- Type: Local reserve defence force
- Role: Light Infantry to support and reinforce British Forces South Atlantic Islands and additional roles
- Size: Platoon to company-strength; 2 permanent staff; 40–100 primary reservists (Note: The force had around 70 members in 2010. It was reported to be 40 personnel in 2022.); ~100 secondary reservists
- Garrison/HQ: Port Stanley
- Motto: Faithful In Defence
- Anniversaries: 13 December
- Engagements: Falklands War
- Website: falklands.gov.fk/defenceforce

Commanders
- Commanding officer: Maj Daniel Biggs

The Falkland Islands Defence Force (FIDF) is the locally maintained volunteer defence force in the Falkland Islands, a British Overseas Territory. The FIDF works alongside the military units supplied by the United Kingdom to ensure the security of the islands.

The FIDF is not a part of the British Armed Forces, it is independently funded and controlled by the Falkland Islands Government.

== History ==
=== Origin ===
In 1847, Lieutenant Richard Clement Moody, Governor of the Falkland Islands, formed the Falklands' militia force, consisting of two infantry platoons, and a combined mounted and artillery unit. A volunteer unit was reformed in 1854, during the Crimean War, to guard against possible aggression by the Russian Empire.

In 1892, a steamer owned by one of the belligerents involved in the Chilean Civil War docked at Port Stanley. Ostensibly there to carry out repairs to its engines, the presence onboard of 200 armed soldiers was considered a security threat, and Governor Sir Roger Goldsworthy therefore ordered that an armed volunteer force be formed. The first draft of men of the Falkland Islands Volunteer Corps were sworn in at a ceremony at the Falkland Government House, in June 1892.

=== World War I ===
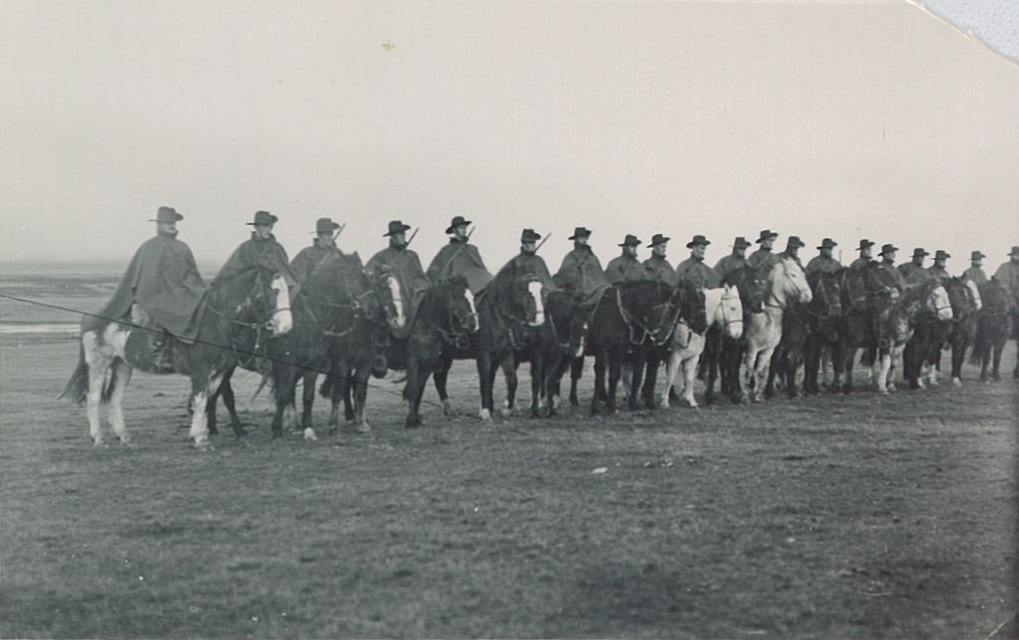
Members of the force on horseback in 1914.

During the First World War, members of the Volunteer Corps were mobilised to man military outposts around the Islands, while 36 Falklanders enlisted in the British armed forces, 10 of whom subsequently lost their lives during the war. In 1919 the Falkland Island Volunteer Corps were stood down and were subsequently renamed as the Falkland Islands Defence Force on 13 December 1920.

During the First World War the Volunteers were issued the General Service Corps cap badge. This was used into the 1930s on dress uniforms.

=== Inter-war ===
In 1931 on the recommendation of Captain C.E.C Ransome Royal Marines visiting the island on HMS Danae the Defence Force adopted Royal Marine Blue Dress Uniforms for ceremonial duties. This style of uniform is still in use today.

=== World War II ===
The FIDF was mobilised again during the Second World War, manning defensive outposts around the Islands. At this time, a mounted rifles unit was raised.

On 27 September 1939, thirty-three men arrived from Argentina in a group called the "Tabaris Highlanders." Gathered from the Anglo-Argentine community, they were supposed to defend the islands from a German attack. Six of these volunteers were rejected on medical and other grounds and returned to Buenos Aires almost immediately. The "commanding officer," a Major Morrough, was one of those rejected. The remainder were enrolled in the Falkland Islands Defence Force, with Ronald Campbell made sergeant as commander and Thomas Dawson Sanderson made corporal. Many were rugby players, including Sanderson, who was president of a rugby club.

The men left the Islands on 8 December 1939, once the immediate danger of attack from German raiders was judged to have receded. During this time the Highlanders dug out gun pits, embankments, and other protection from a possible German naval attack. Twenty-two of them applied from Stanley to join the British Forces.

During the war, around 150 islanders joined the British armed forces, of which 26 were killed in action. In June 1946 a section of the FIDF took part in the Victory Parade in London.

=== Post-war ===
After the end of the war, the presence of Royal Marines as part of the Islands' defence led to the FIDF adopting their drill styles. On 28 September 1966, 19 members of an Argentine extremist group staged a symbolic invasion of the Islands by landing a DC-4 on Stanley Racecourse, in one of the first significant hijacking incidents; the extremist group called this action Operation Condor. There, they took four islanders hostage. The FIDF, alongside the Royal Marines, contained the situation and the group surrendered without casualties. Following this, the FIDF was on heightened alert until February 1967.

=== Falklands War ===
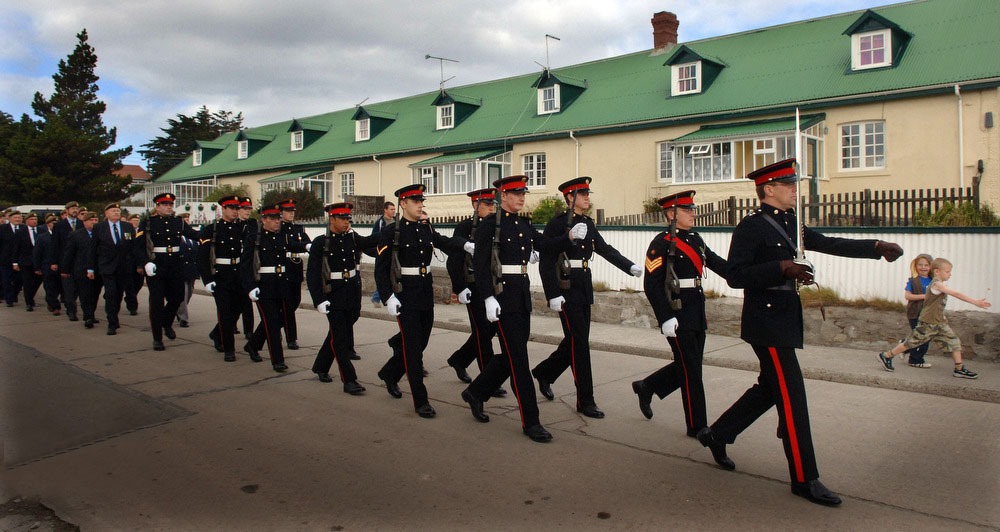
A parade led by a detachment of the Falkland Islands Defence Force in 2007.

On 1 April 1982, alongside the Royal Marines party, the FIDF was mobilised to defend the Islands from the Argentine invasion. Many of its members lived in remote settlements so given the limited notice of its approximately 120 men some 32 turned out. A number of weapons from the FIDF armoury were supplied to the Royal Marines, as the recently arrived replacement party had travelled unarmed; as a result of this, several FIDF men had to be equipped with obsolete Lee Enfield rifles and Sten guns. Initially the FIDF was tasked with defending key points in Stanley; the radio station, telephone exchange and power station. However, fearing subsequent reprisals against civilians, the Governor, Sir Rex Hunt ordered them not to engage the Argentinian forces and to withdraw to the Drill Hall; this was only reluctantly complied with and one detachment sent a runner to query the order, but the Governor had surrendered all forces before it could be confirmed. The Argentines confiscated all of the FIDF's equipment and declared them to be an illegal organisation. For the duration of the war, some members of the FIDF were kept under house arrest at Fox Bay until the Argentine surrender. The FIDF was reformed in 1983.

Terry Peck, a former member of the Defence Force, spied on Argentine forces in Stanley, then escaped to become a scout for the 3rd Battalion, Parachute Regiment, with which he fought at the Battle of Mount Longdon.

On 28 April 2021, a new motto "Faithful in Defence" was awarded to the FIDF following approval by the Queen.

== Personnel ==
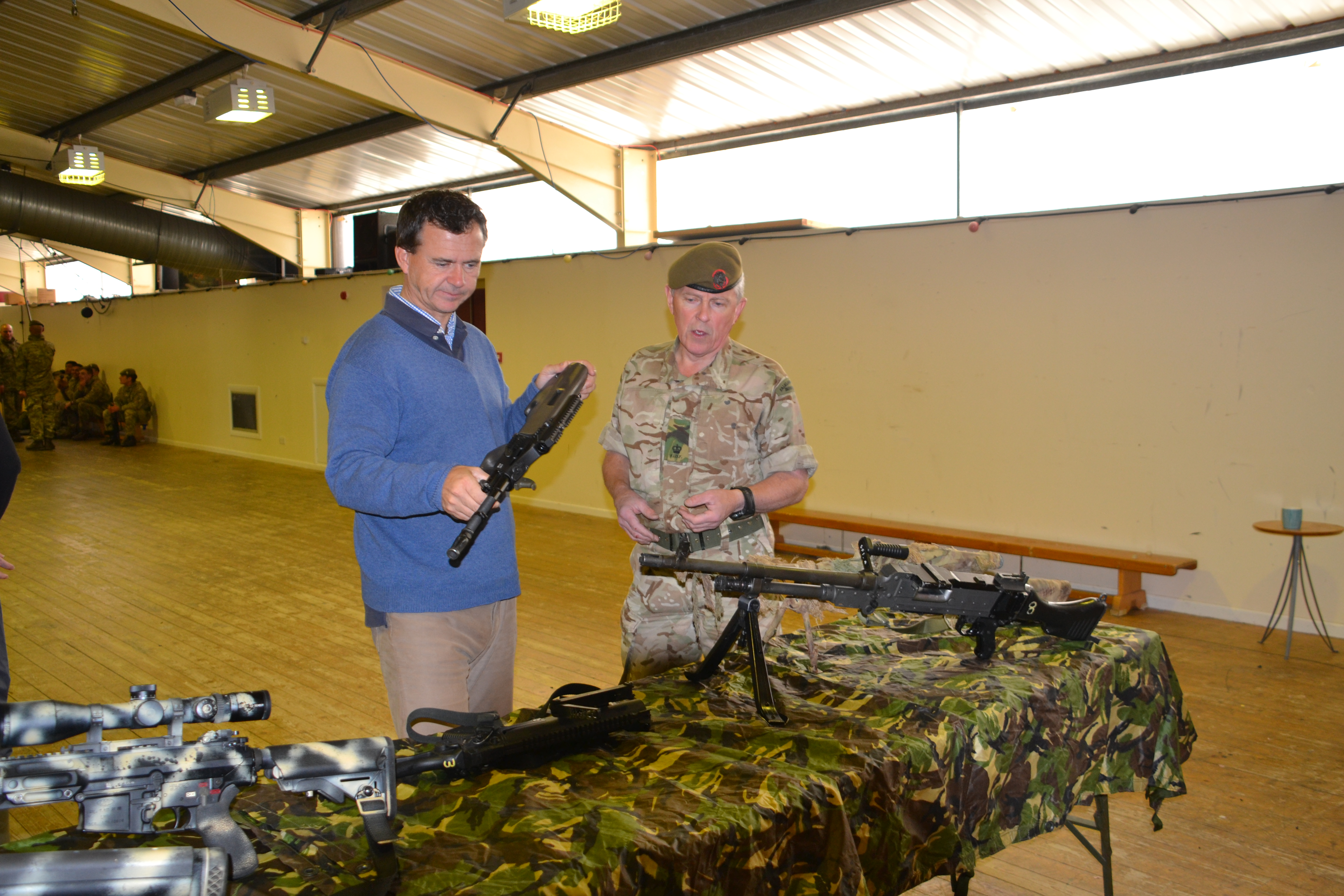
Parliamentary Under-Secretary for Defence Veterans, Reserves and Personnel Mark Lancaster with Major Peter Biggs in 2016.

The Falkland Islands Defence Force meet once a week for training, with various extended training weekends throughout the year. Soldiers of the Falkland Islands Defence Force conduct training patrols with soldiers from the British garrison on the islands as well as acting as "enemy" forces against British soldiers in training exercises.

FIDF soldiers provide search and rescue and mountain rescue services across the islands and can deploy aboard the Falklands Government patrol vessel for sovereignty protection duties if the vessel requires an armed presence.

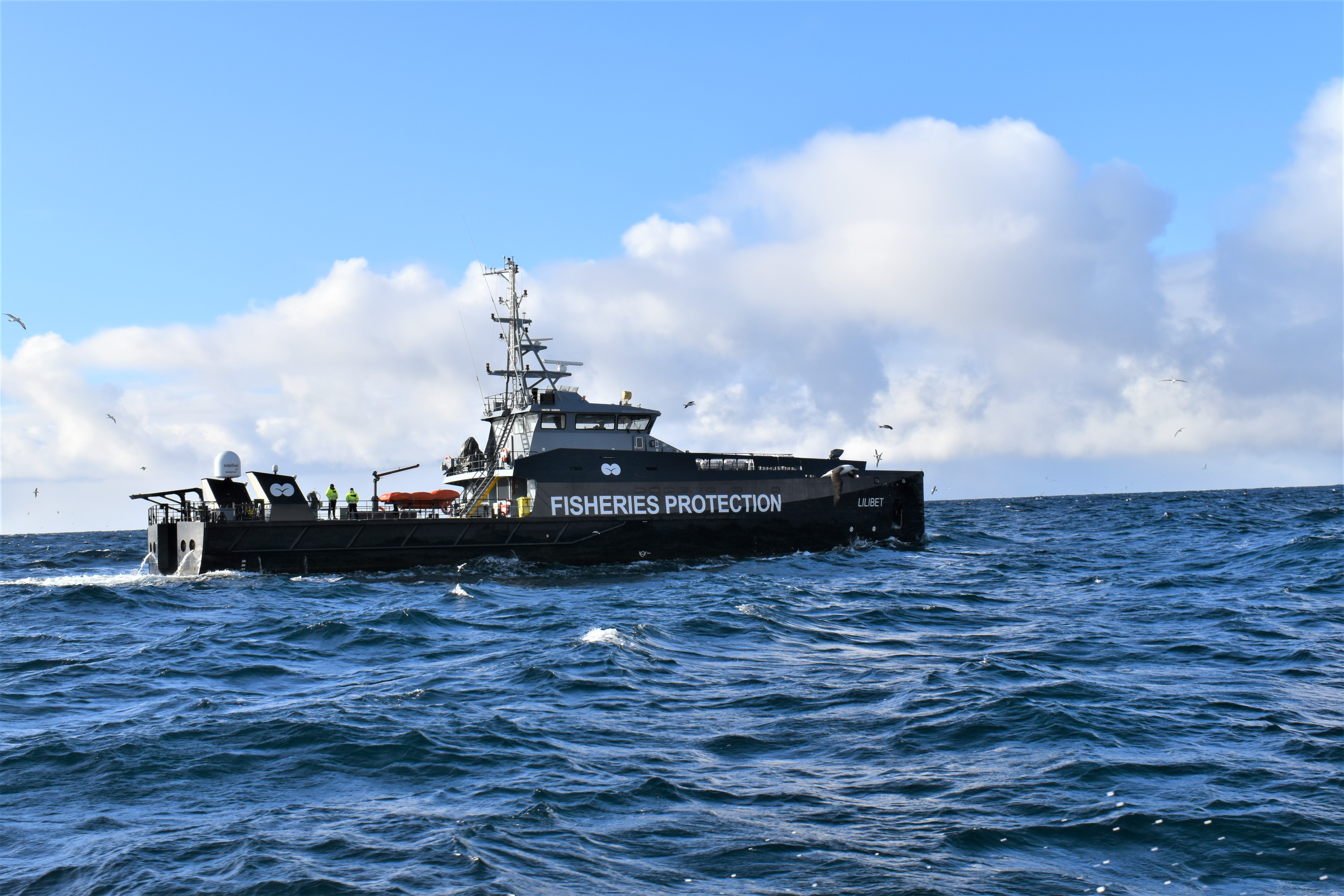
FPV Lilibet on patrol in the South Atlantic, July 2023

As of 2023, the Falklands Government sovereignty and fisheries patrol vessel is the FPV Lilibet, which arrived in the islands in April and is tasked with policing the exclusive economic zone around the islands. The ship is named in honour of the late Queen Elizabeth II, and has been leased to the Falklands Government by Seagull Maritime Limited for fifteen years starting in 2022. Civilian-crewed, the vessel is a Damen Stan 5009 patrol ship with a maximum speed of up to 29.5 knots (54.6 km/h; 33.9 mph) and a crew of up to 28 persons. She has an endurance of 30 days, though sixty days of provisions can be carried. If patrolling at 10 knots she can reportedly operate for 42 days with a range of up to 10,000 nautical miles (19,000 km; 12,000 mi). She is fitted with two Browning .50 caliber heavy machine gun mounts though she routinely deploys unarmed.

Major Peter Biggs served with the FIDF for 35 years and was the Commanding Officer from 2002 to 2018. Justin McPhee was selected as the next commanding officer of the FIDF in 2018. In 2019, Major Justin McPhee became the first FIDF Officer to complete the Intermediate Command & Staff Course (Land Reserves) at the UK Defence Academy alongside UK regular and reserve soldiers and international students.

Daniel Biggs was appointed commanding officer in September 2023.

== Equipment ==
Equipment includes:

- L85A2
- Steyr M9
- L129A1 Sharpshooter Rifle, a semi-automatic designated marksman's rifle also in use with the British Army.
- Browning Hi-Power pistol
- L7 general purpose machine gun
- Manroy M2HB .50 inch machine gun
- Armed Land Rovers
- Quad Bikes

Former equipment

- Steyr AUG assault rifle – uniquely used by the FIDF among British forces, this was replaced by the L85A2 in 2019. Around 160 AUGs were acquired.
- Steyr AUG HBAR (Heavy-Barreled Automatic Rifle) light support weapon, this was replaced by the L86 in 2019.

== Funding ==
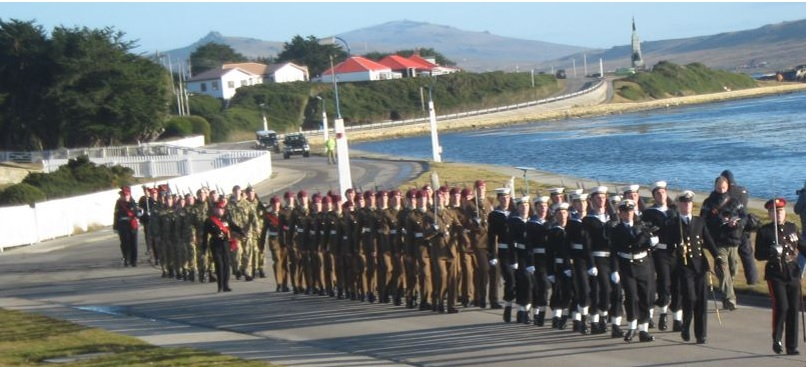
A parade by detachments from (right to left) the Royal Navy, the Parachute Regiment, and the Falkland Islands Defence Force, on 14 June 2013

The Falkland Islands Defence Force today is funded entirely by the Falkland Islands government and has an annual budget of £400,000.

== Organisation ==
The FIDF is organised as a light infantry company with additional roles, though, as of 2022, it was reported to be closer to platoon-strength with 40 personnel. It is composed entirely of volunteers from the local population, based on British Army doctrine, training and operations. New recruits go through a 12-week training programme. In an agreement with the British Ministry of Defence, a Royal Marines Warrant Officer Class 2 is seconded to the Force as a Permanent Staff Instructor. In an emergency, the size of the force can be almost doubled by calling out the "Secondary Reserve Personnel" who are former active members.

Members of the FIDF swear allegiance to the Monarch of the United Kingdom, Presently King Charles III, and the Governor of the Island acts as the Commander-in-Chief of the force, however in practice the Governor is obliged by law to consult with the Commander of British Forces on the island on decisions involving the FIDF and act on the advice of the Commander of British Forces.

== Insignia ==
=== Cap badge ===
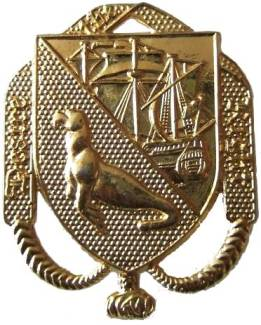
FIDF cap badge

The cap badge is the badge of the FIDF cast in metal. It shows the escutcheon party per bend, with a Sea Lion in the lower half, and the rear end of an old sail ship in the upper half, surrounded by the slogan "Desire the Right". This badge was formerly the Coat of arms of the Falkland Islands from 1925 to 1948.

=== Ranks ===
The ranks of the FIDF are the same as those used in the British Army/Royal Marines. Rank slides have the badge of Rank and wording on bottom of 'FALKLAND ISLANDS'

Rank group	General / flag officers	Senior officers	Junior officers
Falkland Islands Defence Force
Falkland Islands Defence Force		Major	Captain	Lieutenant	Second lieutenant

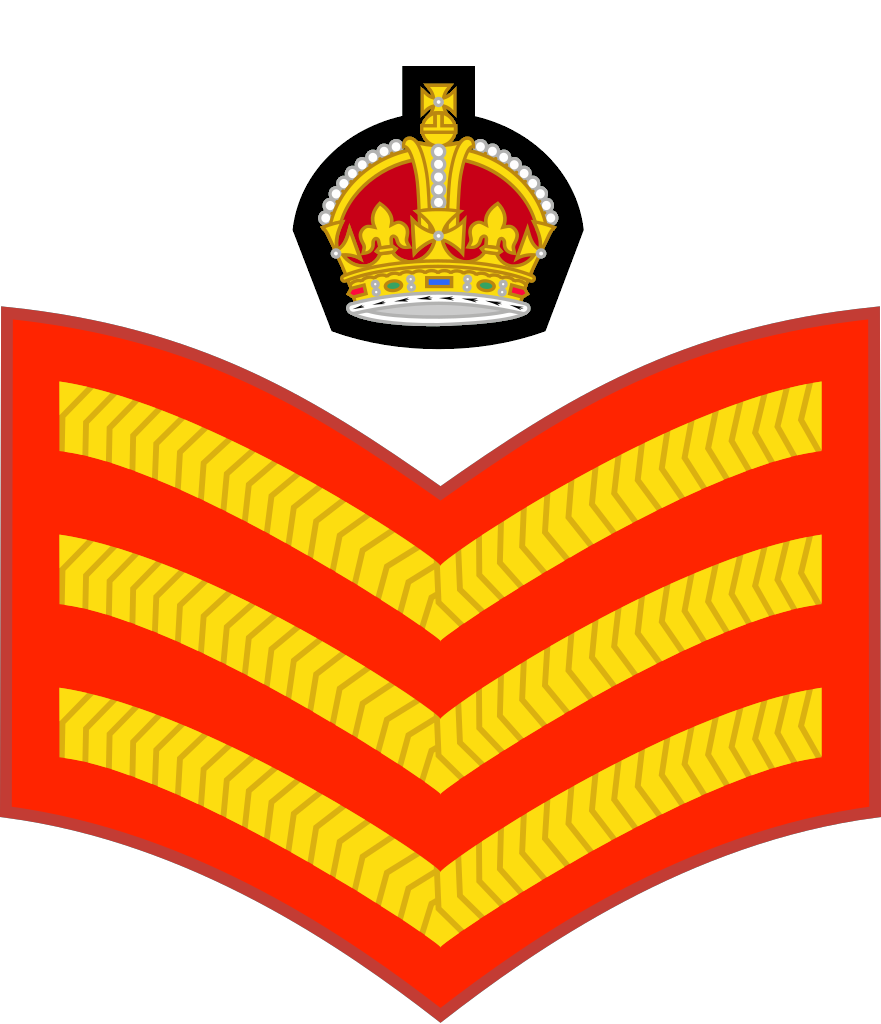
Rank group	Senior NCOs			Junior NCOs		Enlisted
Falkland Islands Defence Force						No insignia
Falkland Islands Defence Force	Warrant officer class 2 (Permanent staff instructor)	Colour sergeant	Sergeant	Corporal	Lance corporal	Private

== Alliances ==
- United Kingdom – The Yorkshire Regiment (14th/15th, 19th and 33rd/76th Foot)
- United Kingdom – Royal Marines

== See also ==
- Military of the Falkland Islands
- Overseas military bases of the United Kingdom
- Royal Bermuda Regiment
- Cayman Islands Regiment
- Turks and Caicos Islands Regiment
- Royal Gibraltar Regiment
- Royal Montserrat Defence Force
- Royal Hong Kong Regiment (defunct)
- British Army Training and Support Unit Belize
