= Royal Montserrat Defence Force =

Home defence unit of Montserrat

Royal Monserrat Defence Force
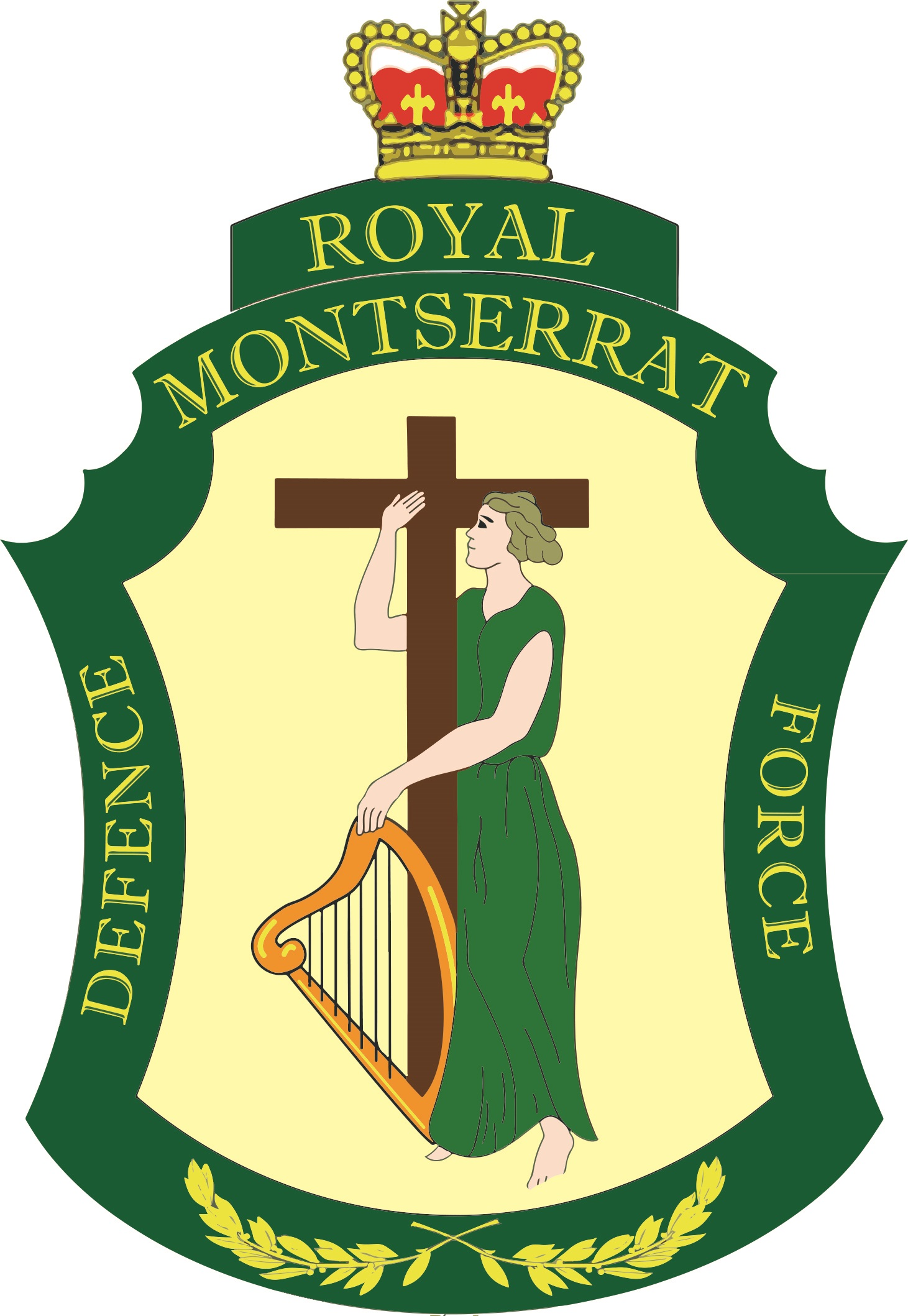
- Badge of the Royal Monserrat Defence Force
- Active: 1898-present
- Country: Montserrat; United Kingdom
- Branch: British Army
- Type: Military reserve force
- Role: Civil Defence, local and regional humanitarian operations, Ceremonial Duties
- Size: 40 Reserve personnel as of 2018-19; Objective for 2021-22: 50 personnel
- Garrison/HQ: Brades

Commanders
- Commanding officer: Lt Col Alvin E. Ryan, ED CCM BEM
- Regimental Sergeant Major: WO1 Barry Carlisle Williams
- Commander-In-Chief: King Charles III

Insignia
- Abbreviation: RMDF

The Royal Montserrat Defence Force is the home defence unit of the British Overseas Territory of Montserrat. The force has an authorized strength level objective of 50 reserve personnel as of 2021-22, akin in size to that of a platoon-sized unit.

== History ==
=== Foundation ===
The Royal Montserrat Defence Force was raised in 1898. The unit has a historical association with the Irish Guards.

=== The World Wars ===
At the outbreak of World War 1 in 1914 very quickly many in the Caribbean including in Montserrat mobilised.

=== 1995-1999 Soufrière Hills Volcanic Eruption ===
During the Soufrière Hill Eruption the RMDF along with support from mainland UK Military forces was a vital asset the response in the evacuations and Humanitarian Aid and Disaster Relief (HADR) Operations.

=== King Charles III Coronation ===
In 2023, the Royal Montserrat Defence Force was one of four Caribbean British Overseas Military forces that took part in King Charles III Coronation Parade. The RMDF was joined by Royal Bermuda Regiment, Cayman Islands Regiment, and Turks and Caicos Islands Regiment from the Caribbean.

=== Current Day ===
The Defence Force is today a reduced force of about forty to fifty volunteer soldiers, primarily concerned with civil Defence and ceremonial duties. The current Commanding Officer is Lieutenant-Colonel Alvin Ryan, who was first appointed the force commanding officer in 2014, and who assumed command from the late Captain Horatio Tuitt. The appointment of a unit commander at the Lieutenant-Colonel level in 2022 was a first-time event for the force. As a British Overseas Territory (BOT), defence of Montserrat remains the responsibility of the United Kingdom. On 5 September 2024 Governor of Montserrat announced Major General Alex turner as Honorary Colonel of RMDF.

== Uniform ==
=== Ranks ===
Ranks are as follows:(The RMDF use the Star of St Patrick as a 'pip' like Irish Guards)

Rank group	General / flag officers	Senior officers		Junior officers
Royal Montserrat Defence Force
Royal Montserrat Defence Force		Lieutenant Colonel	Major	Captain	Lieutenant	Second lieutenant	Officer cadet

Rank group	Senior NCOs				Junior NCOs		Enlisted
Royal Montserrat Defence Force							No insignia
Royal Montserrat Defence Force	Warrant officer class 1	Warrant officer class 2	Staff	Sergeant	Corporal	Lance corporal	Private

== See also ==
- Royal Bermuda Regiment
- Cayman Islands Regiment
- Turks and Caicos Islands Regiment
- Royal Gibraltar Regiment
- Falkland Islands Defence Force
- British Army Training and Support Unit Belize
- Overseas military bases of the United Kingdom
