= Cayman Islands Regiment =

Infantry regiment of the British Army

- Active: 2020–present
- Country: Cayman Islands; United Kingdom
- Branch: British Army
- Type: Line Infantry; Engineer
- Role: Internal Security, Local & Regional Humanitarian Operations
- Size: Company-strength level (91 personnel as of March 2022; authorized strength objective: 175 personnel)
- Garrison/HQ: George Town
- Motto: In Arduis Paratus (Prepared in Adversity)

Commanders
- Commanding officer: Lieutenant Colonel Graham Muir
- Regimental Sergeant Major: WO1 Marc Jefferies
- Honorary Colonel: Major General The Lord Lancaster of Kimbolton

Insignia
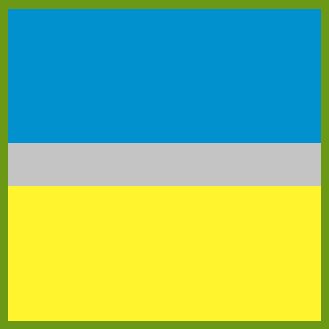
- Tactical Recognition Flash
- Abbreviation: CIR

The Cayman Islands Regiment is the home defence unit of the British Overseas Territory of the Cayman Islands. It is a territorial infantry and engineer reserve unit of the British Armed Forces that was formed in 2020. The regiment has an authorized strength level objective of 175 personnel, akin to that of a company-sized unit.

== History ==
=== 2019 ===
On 12 October 2019, the government announced the formation of the Cayman Islands Regiment, a new British Armed Forces unit. The Cayman Islands Regiment was planned to become operational in 2020, with an initial 35–50 personnel of mostly reservists that are locally recruited and initially trained as assault pioneers. The regiment is expected to see an increase of personnel to several hundred. The main remit of the regiment is humanitarian aid and internal security. However, the regiment is to be assisted by the UK Ministry of Defence and Foreign and Commonwealth Office in the form of logistical advice, support and future operational training and equipment. It was said to be in ways similar to the Royal Bermuda Regiment, the Royal Gibraltar Regiment, the Falkland Islands Defence Force and Royal Montserrat Defence Force and is to be linked with the British Army Corps of Royal Engineers. A team of experts from the United Kingdom Ministry of Defence and the Foreign and Commonwealth Office will deploy to the Cayman Islands before end of year for operational needs assessment, to begin the advisory and support roles and to determine a suitable location to base the regiment.

On 15 October 2019, Government of Bermuda issued a statement that the Royal Bermuda Regiment is ready to assist the Cayman Islands Regiment and to share their experiences, as the Cayman Islands Regiment builds.

In mid-November 2019, the team from the United Kingdom Ministry of Defence from 131 Commando Squadron Royal Engineers, 40 Commando Royal Marines, and Royal Navy arrived in Grand Cayman to begin work on setting up the Cayman Islands Regiment.

In mid-December 2019, recruitment for junior and commanding officers began, with the commanding officers expected to begin work in January 2020 and the junior officers to begin work in February 2020.

In December 2019, Turks and Caicos Islands Governor Nigel Dakin had announced that they will also follow the Cayman Islands in the formation of the Turks and Caicos Islands Regiment. The Turks and Caicos Regiment will operate similarly to the Cayman Islands Regiment and the Royal Bermuda Regiment and the roles of the regiment will also be the same as their British Overseas Territories counterparts. The Turks and Caicos Regiment also will be assisted by the UK Ministry of Defence and Foreign and Commonwealth Office.

=== 2020 ===
In late January 2020, the first set of senior officers and junior officers were chosen. The Commanding Officer was announced to be Lieutenant Colonel Simon Watson, who was formerly an Officer for the Royal Dragoon Guards. The Second in Command is Lieutenant Colonel Simon Spiers. The Staff Judge Advocate and Regimental Legal Advisor is Major Andre Mon Desir, who was the Supreme Court Judge in Trinidad and Tobago and also a member of the Trinidad and Tobago Defence Force. The first six junior officers were chosen, these six will be sent for training in mid-February 2020 to Bermuda with the Royal Bermuda Regiment, and thereafter onwards to the United Kingdom for additional officer training at Royal Military Academy Sandhurst. An additional 50-60 personnel will be recruited and will also be sent for training in Bermuda with the Royal Bermuda Regiment in early Summer 2020. The regimental sergeant major is Warrant Officer 1 David Shelton, who has had 13 years of non-commissioned officer experience in the British Army with operational tours of duty, training, and recruitment.

In early June 2020, five of the junior officer cadets began their officer training at Royal Military Academy Sandhurst and the recruitment of the 50 additional personnel began.

=== 2021 ===
In late 2020 into early 2021 saw the recruitment of Cohort 1 of 2021. A short-term training team was deployed to Grand Cayman to assist the regiment with the training of the recruits as well as to deliver kit. In the summer of 2021, saw the recruitment of Cohort 2 of 2021 which also saw another short-term training team also deployed from the UK to assist. Also during the summer of 2021 saw the regiment acquire logistical vehicular equipment by way of three HX-60 MANS Trucks, two Unimog ambulances, one Volvo front loader, and one Kratcher tactical field kitchen trailer. In 2021 the Cayman Islands Regiment also saw the official publication of the Defence Bill in the Cayman Islands Parliament.

== Organisation ==
=== Structure ===
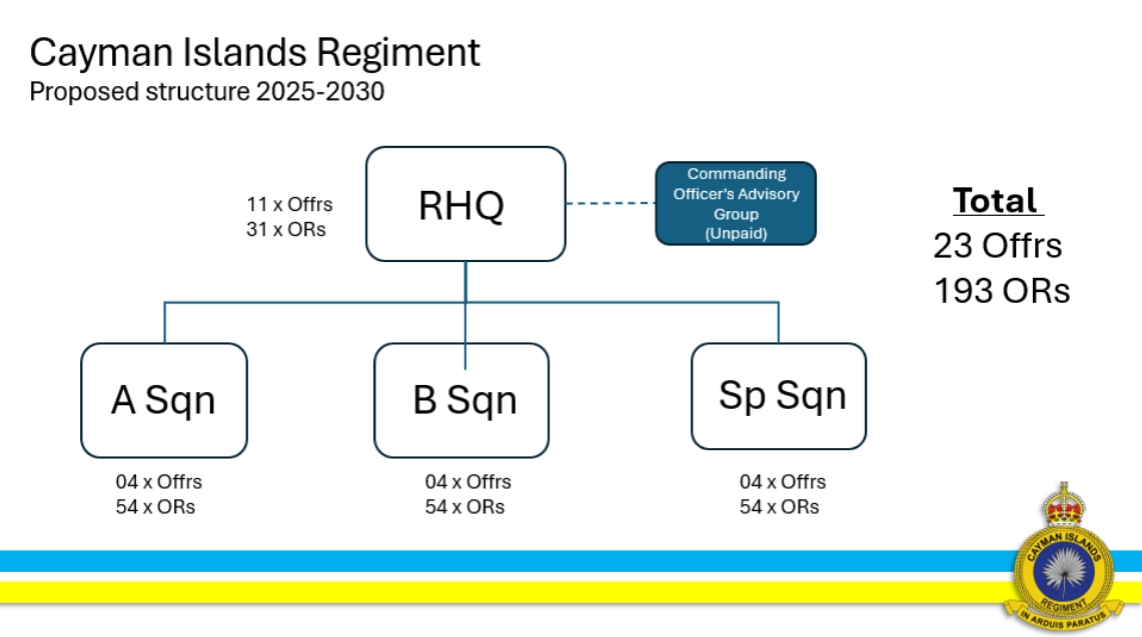
Cayman Islands Regiment Structure 2025

=== Leadership ===
The Cayman Islands is a British overseas territory (BOT). Its defence is therefore the responsibility of the United Kingdom. The Governor of the Cayman Islands is the Crown's (Charles III) Representative on the islands. Consequently, the Cayman Islands Regiment is under the control of the Governor, who acts as Commander-in-Chief of the Regiment. Remuneration and financing is the responsibility of the Ministry of Home Affairs. There is additional assistance, especially with training and equipment, from the Ministry of Defence. The Regiment's Honorary Colonel is Major General Mark Lancaster, Baron Lancaster of Kimbolton.

== Commanding officers ==
Lieutenant Colonel Graham Muir became the regiment's commanding officer in March 2026.

=== Former commanding officers ===
- Lieutenant Colonel Simon Watson (2020–2023)
- Colonel Roger Carter (2023–2026)

== Recruitment and training ==
=== Commissioned officers ===
The first set of junior officer recruits were sent to Bermuda to train at Warwick Camp alongside recruits of the Royal Bermuda Regiment for their basic military training. This is a two-week course. The first set of Junior Officers then went on to an intense condensed 8 week Officer course at Royal Military Academy Sandhurst. The following sets of Officer Cadets were sent directly to the 8 week course at Royal Military Academy Sandhurst.

=== Non-commissioned officers and recruits ===
Upon passing through the selection process recruits attend a 14-day non-residential Basic training camp. The basic training gives the recruits the following requisite skills: weapon training, first-aid, radio communications, drill, basic navigation and fitness. Since 2020 the regiment has taken on several cohorts with 1-2 new cohorts a year. As of mid-2021 the regiment has over 100 members, and is still growing. Further training is given to the members after basic training, this not only further skills gained by the members but also provides promotions through the ranks.

== Uniforms ==
=== Cap badge ===
The regimental cap badge of the Cayman Islands Regiment is a compilation of elements that honour Caymanian heritage. 'The Crown' signifies Cayman's ties to the UK. 'The Three Wraps of Gold Rope' symbolizes the seafaring heritage of the forefathers from Grand Cayman, Cayman Brac, and Little Cayman. 'The Silver Thatch Palm' is Cayman's National Plant, and this is silhouetted against the blue of the Sea that surrounds the Islands.

=== Clothing ===
The uniforms, weapons, and equipment for the Cayman Islands Regiment will be provided by the United Kingdom Ministry of Defence. During the basic training, the recruits are given the same kits as those of the Royal Bermuda Regiment recruits. This is mainly the British Army's No. 8 Combat Dress Multi-Terrain Pattern Personal Clothing System – Combat Uniform (PCS-CU). The PCS-CU mostly consists of a windproof smock, a lightweight jacket, and trousers with a range of ancillaries such as thermals and waterproofs. Recruits are also issued with British Army Standard Issued Brown Combat Boots. Regimental Personnel also have the No.2 Service Dress, This is (part of Future Army Dress (FAD) programme) a khaki Jacket and Trousers with Fawn dress shirt with tie and dress shoes. No.3 Warm Weather (ceremonial) Dress, This is a white Tunic with dark blue Trousers with a yellow running stripe at the sides. No.4 Warm Weather Service Dress, This is for the Officers its similar to the No.2 however in a Stone colour. The No.13 Barracks Dress, This is similar to the No. 2 without the jacket and could be worn with green 'wolly-pully' jumper or woollen jersey.

=== Ranks ===
Ranks of the Cayman Islands Regiment are exactly the same as the rest of the British Army:

Commissioned officers

Rank group	General / flag officers	Senior officers		Junior officers
Cayman Islands Regiment
Cayman Islands Regiment		*Honorary Colonel	Lieutenant colonel	Major	Captain	Lieutenant	Second lieutenant	Officer cadet

Non-commissioned officers

Rank group	Senior NCOs				Junior NCOs		Enlisted
Cayman Islands Regiment							No insignia
Cayman Islands Regiment	Warrant officer class 1	Warrant officer class 2	Staff sergeant	Sergeant	Corporal	Lance corporal	Private

== Equipment ==
=== Rifles ===
Name	Origin	Type	Cartridge	Image	Details
SIG Sauer SIG516	United States	Assault Rifle	5.56×45mm NATO		Adopted as the Standard issue assault rifle for Regiment Personnel.

=== Pistols ===
Name	Origin	Type	Cartridge	Image	Details
Springfield Armory XD	Croatia	Semi-automatic pistol	9×19mm Parabellum		Adopted as the new standard-issue sidearm pistol for Regiment Personnel.

=== Vehicles ===
Cayman Islands Regiment used the following vehicles as of 2025:

Name	Origin	Type	Number	Image	Details
Operational field Vehicles
Toyota Hilux Operations Truck	Japan	Field Operation Vehicle	4		The modified Toyota HiLux Trucks chosen for the Cayman Islands Regiment equipped with a winch, deep water snorkel and high wind mesh on windows and trailer hitch for towing capabilities.
Logistic Trucks
MAN SV MAN HX60 4x4 Truck	Germany	Troop Transport, Cargo and Support vehicle	5		The MAN family of support vehicles was chosen for the Cayman Islands Regiment and is the same currently in service with the rest of the British Army. The Cayman Islands Regiment obtained 3 HX60 4x4 Trucks, of the 3 trucks, 2 are Drop Side Cargo Trucks and 1 is a Crane Truck. They have good mobility and the ability to travel over flooded roads during disasters.
Foden Foden DROPS Truck	United Kingdom	Improved Medium Mobility Load Carrier (IMMLC), Cargo and Support vehicle	3		The Foden Demountable Rack Offload and Pickup System (DROPS) Improved Medium Mobility load Carrier (IMMLC) vehicles was chosen for the Cayman Islands Regiment it is also in service with rest of the British Army although being phased out. The Cayman Islands Regiment obtained 3 Foden DROPS IMMLC trucks, they are 2 operated as Pallet Trucks and 1 operated as a tow recovery vehicle. The regiment has 7 pallets with these trucks, 2 pallets have tanks, 1 for water and 1 for Fuel along with 5 standard pallets. They have an increased ground clearance which is good for traveling over flooded roads or uneven terrain during disasters.
Military Ambulance
Unimog U3000, U4000 and U5000 Mercedes Benz Unimog U1300L 4X4 Medical Ambulance	Germany	Off-road Military Ambulance	3		Two Mercedes Unimog obtained for the Cayman Islands Regiment and were outfitted as Off-road Military Ambulance.
Engineering Vehicles
Volvo Construction Equipment Volvo 4200 Wheeled Loader	Sweden	Wheeled Loader	1		Heavy wheeled loader. The Volvo loader obtained for the Cayman Islands Regiment for road and path clearance during disasters and for cargo loading and offloading. The Wheeled Loader comes with two front attachments, a front loader bucket and a forklift.
JCB J.C. Bamford Excavators Limited (JCB) Backhoe loader	United Kingdom	Backhoe Loader	1		Backhoe wheeled loader. The JCB Backhoe loader donated to the Cayman Islands Regiment for road and path clearance during disasters. The Backhoe Loader also comes with two front attachments, a front loader bucket and a forklift.
Military Trailers
Penman LWT 1.13T Drop Tail Gate Trailer	United Kingdom	Drop Tail Gate Trailer	4		The Penman LWT 1.13T Drop Tail Gate Trailer used by the Regiment as an additional cargo trailer towed by the Regiment's Hilux Operations vehicle.
Karcher Tactical Field Kitchen TFK 250	Germany	Field Kitchen Trailer	2		The Karcher Tactical Field Kitchen TFK 250 which is a trailer mounted mobile kitchen unit comprising two pressure cookers two pressure roasters two ovens and two water boilers with heat supplied from four burners using a diesel and kerosene fuel mix The TFK has the capacity to produce up to 250 set meals or 500 hotbox meals within a two-hour period.
SERT RLS 2000 Field Laundry Trailer	France	Field Laundry Trailer	2		The SERT RLS 2000 Field Laundry Trailer which is a trailer mounted mobile laundry unit comprising equipment to wash, and spin dry kit and can accommodate approximately 150 persons.

== See also ==
- British Army Training and Support Unit Belize
- Cayman Islands Coast Guard
- Overseas military bases of the United Kingdom
