= Airbus Group =

North American subsidiary of Airbus

Airbus Group, Inc.
- Type: Subsidiary
- Industry: Aerospace, Defense
- Founded: 2003; 23 years ago
- Headquarters: McNair, Virginia, United States (Herndon mailing address)
- Area served: Worldwide
- Revenue: $1.3 billion (2019)
- Number of employees: approx. 3,200 (2021)
- Parent: Airbus SE
- Subsidiaries: Airbus Helicopters, Inc. Airbus Military North America; Cassidian Communications; EADS North America Test and Services; Fairchild Controls Corporation
- Website: www.airbus.com

Airbus Group, Inc. (formerly EADS North America) represents the North American activities of European multinational aerospace company Airbus. Headquartered in Herndon, Virginia, this American arm of the company participates in U.S. Department of Defense programs, in some cases as a prime contractor. The American unit operates under a Special Security Arrangement which allows it to work independently on some of the most sensitive United States defense programs despite its foreign ownership. It employs approximately 3,200 people and had 2011 revenues of $1.3 billion.

In the United States, Airbus Group, Inc., oversees several subsidiaries including Airbus Helicopters, Inc., Cassidian Communications, Airbus Military North America, Fairchild Controls, and EADS North America Test and Services. With locations in 29 U.S. cities and 15 states, these entities provide fixed- and rotary-wing aircraft for commercial and military customers, land and maritime detection and border security technology, emergency call processing and notification solutions, defense electronics and avionics, and services.

== History ==
Since its creation in 2003, Airbus Group Inc. has expanded its footprint through acquisitions and selection in competitions for military aircraft and systems.

In 1974 Aérospatiale took full control of Vought Helicopter and in 1976 renamed it Aerospatiale Helicopter Corporation. In 1979 work began on a new helicopter facility in Grand Prairie, Texas.

- 2002: Grand Prairie facility underwent name change to Eurocopter
- 2003: Grand Prairie facility became part of EADS North America as subsidiary American Eurocopter
- October 2004: EADS North America acquired Racal Instruments (now part of EADS North America Test and Services)
- October 2004: Opened 85,500 sq. ft. helicopter production facility at Golden Triangle Regional Airport, Mississippi
- November 2005: Acquired Talon Instruments (now part of EADS North America Test and Services)
- June 2006: Selected with Sikorsky as prime contractors for Light Utility Helicopter
- February 2007: Opened Airbus Engineering Center in Mobile, AL.
- July–August 2007: Selected to provide unmanned aerial targets DT-35 and DT-45 to U.S. Army
- February 2008: Selected with prime contractor Northrop Grumman to provide KC-45 tanker to U.S. Air Force (award was later cancelled under protest)
- April 2008: Acquired Temecula, CA-based emergency response technology provider Plant CML
- October 2009: Announced expansion of Maintenance, Repair and Overhaul Delivery Center at the Mobile Regional Airport

Plans for a Mobile, Alabama aircraft assembly plant were formally announced by Airbus CEO Fabrice Brégier on 2 July 2012. The plans include a $600 million factory at the Brookley Aeroplex for the assembly of the A319, A320 and A321 aircraft. It could employ up to 1,000 full-time workers when operational. Construction began on 8 April 2013, and will become operable by 2016, producing up to 4 aircraft a month at full production.

== Light Utility Helicopter ==
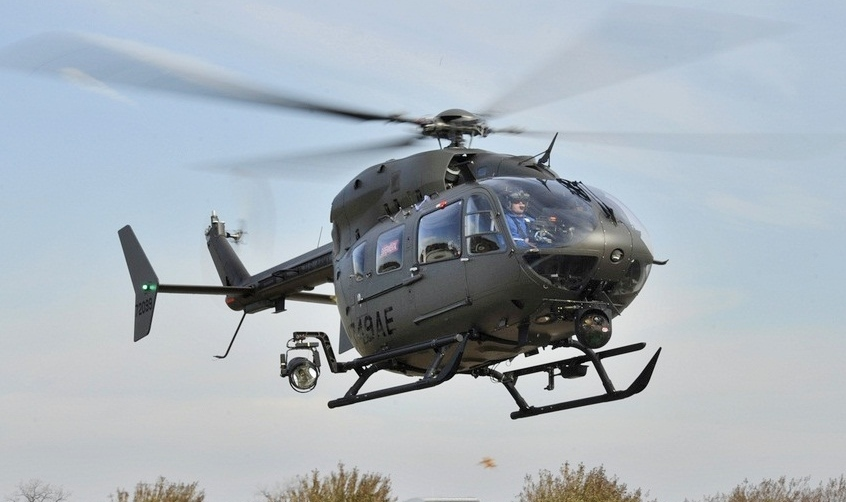
The UH-72A Lakota Light Utility helicopter is flown by the U.S. Army and U.S. Navy

Airbus Group Inc. is a prime contractor to the U.S. Army on the service's new UH-72A Lakota Light Utility Helicopter. The Lakota is based on the commercial EC145. Under terms of a contract awarded in June 2006, Airbus Group Inc. has already delivered more than 200 out of a planned 351 aircraft.

The latest order under the Army's contract, for 32 Lakotas in Fiscal Year 2011, brought total orders to 219. This includes 214 rotary-wing aircraft for the U.S. Army and five already delivered aircraft for the U.S. Navy. The Army is targeting a total acquisition of 346 helicopters through 2016, for a total of 351 from both services.

On 16 November 2017, Airbus sold its 100% subsidiary Airbus Group Inc to its other French subsidiary Airbus SAS.

== Homeland security and homeland defense ==
EADS was listed by Homeland Security Today in April 2011 as the #11 supplier to the Department of Homeland Security and, within the Department, the #2 supplier to the U.S. Coast Guard. Of note, the company's aircraft make up 54% of the Customs and Border Protection helicopter fleet and 71% of the Coast Guard's helicopter fleet.

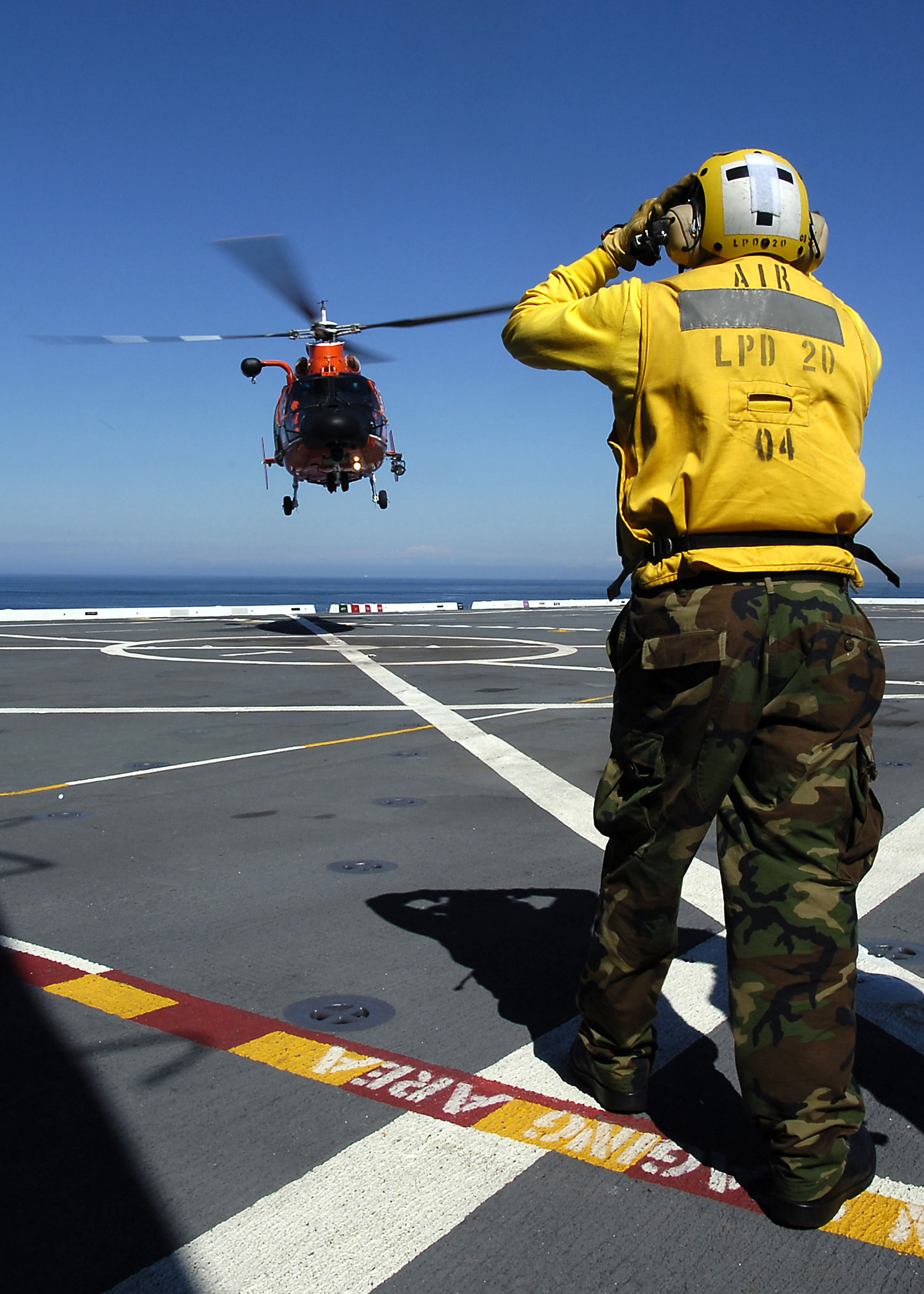
Landing signal enlisted Aviation Boatswain's Mate (Handling) 3rd Class Troy Palomino directs an H-65

Airbus Group Inc. is the prime contractor on the HC-144A Ocean Sentry maritime patrol aircraft, a key element of the U.S. Coast Guard's modernization program. The Coast Guard plans to buy a total of 36 Ocean Sentries; to date, 13 have been delivered. Also serving the Coast Guard is Airbus' H-65 Dolphin helicopter, which is particularly well-suited for search and rescue, fisheries patrols, maritime security, border patrol, monitoring illegal immigration, and drug interdiction.

Its UH-72A Lakota Light Utility Helicopters operate with U.S. Army and National Guard units, providing search and rescue, disaster relief, drug interdiction and medical evacuation services from coast to coast. Other rotary-wing aircraft from Airbus Group's American Eurocopter subsidiary are flown by U.S. Customs and Border Protection along more than 10,000 miles of the nation's borders, as well as by the U.S. Coast Guard, the Federal Bureau of Investigation, Drug Enforcement Administration, and law enforcement agencies across the country.

Airbus Group Inc's subsidiary, Cassidian Communications, provides emergency notification services, emergency call centers and public safety radio systems. Cassidian Communications has nearly 600 employees in California, Tennessee, Indiana, Alabama and Canada. Its products and services provide security for more than 200 million U.S. residents.

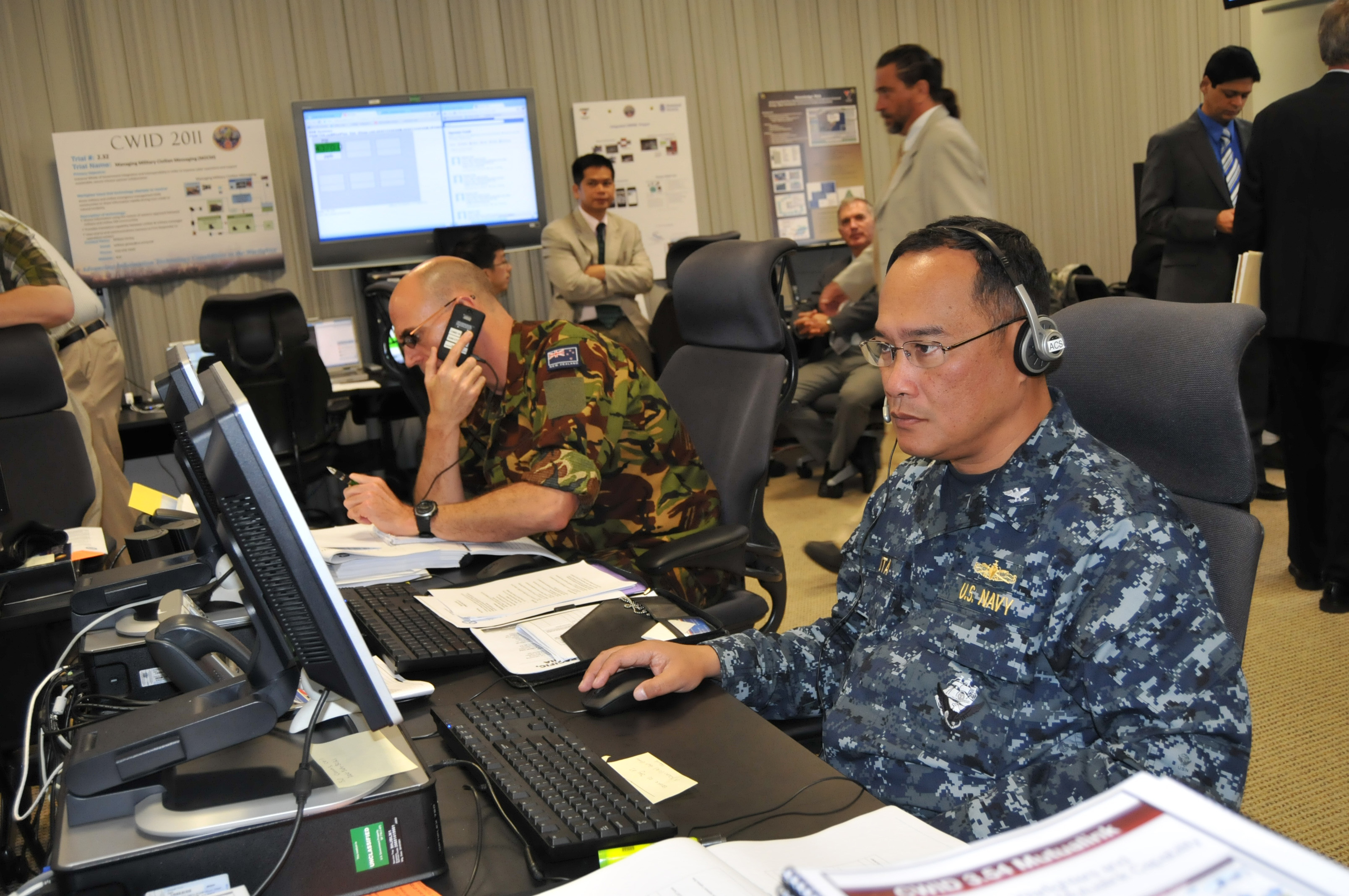
Ectocryp Black in use at the Coalition Warrior Interoperability Demonstration at Joint Forces Command, 2011

The company's multifunction TRS-3D radar has been selected and deployed on both the Coast Guard's National Security Cutter and the Navy's Littoral Combat Ship. The TRS-3D is a lightweight radar that performs surveillance, self-defense, gunfire support, and helicopter control.

Other security programs currently undergoing development for the U.S. market include

- The man-portable SONEX-P, which is able to detect both the presence and location of hidden chemical, radiological and explosive threats in minutes with the push of a button.
- ECTOCRYP BLACK, a purpose-built, high-capacity voice encryption device that enables secure voice communications among geographically disparate users and between unclassified and secret networks.

== U.S. Air Force KC-45 Tanker ==
EADS North America teamed with then-prime contractor Northrop Grumman to win the KC-X aerial refueling tanker competition in 2008, however the contract was successfully appealed by Boeing.

Following Northrop Grumman's withdrawal from the subsequent procurement in 2010, the Department of Defense indicated it would welcome a bid from EADS North America as prime contractor. EADS North America submitted a compliant proposal in July 2010. In February 2011 the Air Force announced it had awarded the contract to Boeing, and EADS North America chose not to protest.

The KC-45A would have been based on EADS' A330 Multi Role Tanker Transport, itself a derivative of the A330 commercial jetliner, and would have been assembled in Mobile, Alabama.

== Facilities ==
Since its formation in 2003 it has expanded existing facilities in Mississippi, Texas, California and Alabama, and built three new facilities in the U.S.:

- Columbus, Miss.
- Mobile International Airport, Ala.
- Airbus Engineering Center, Ala.

== See also ==
- Defense contractor
