= Golden Triangle Regional Airport =

Airport in Mississippi, US

- IATA: GTR; ICAO: KGTR; FAA LID: GTR

Summary
- Airport type: Public
- Owner: Golden Triangle Regional Authority
- Serves: Columbus, Starkville, West Point
- Location: Unincorporated Lowndes County, Mississippi
- Elevation AMSL: 264 ft (80 m)
- Coordinates: 33°26′54″N 088°35′29″W
- Website: www.GTRA.com

Map
- Location of airport in Mississippi GTR (the United States)

Runways
Direction	Length		Surface
Direction	ft	m	Surface
18/36	8,003	2,439	Asphalt

Statistics (2023)
- Aircraft operations (year ending 3/31/2023): 51,205
- Based aircraft: 37
- Source: Federal Aviation Administration

Golden Triangle Regional Airport (IATA: GTR, ICAO: KGTR, FAA LID: GTR) is a public use airport in unincorporated Lowndes County, Mississippi. The airport is located approximately midway between the cities of Columbus, Starkville, and West Point, Mississippi, and serves the surrounding Golden Triangle region of Mississippi and parts of West Alabama. GTR is used for general and military aviation, and charter aircraft.

As per Federal Aviation Administration records, the airport had 35,669 passenger boardings (enplanements) in calendar year 2008, 36,275 enplanements in 2009, and 36,329 in 2010. It is included in the National Plan of Integrated Airport Systems for 2011–2015, which categorized it as a primary commercial service airport (more than 10,000 enplanements per year). It is the third-busiest commercial airport in the state of Mississippi.

GTR is the nucleus of a new industrial complex in northeast Mississippi. American Eurocopter (now Airbus Helicopters), a subsidiary of EADS North America, moved into an 85,000-square-foot (7,900 m^{2}) helicopter production plant built by the airport and leased to the company on airport property in 2004. In 2007, American Eurocopter finished the second phase of the project, a 220,000-square-foot (20,000 m^{2}) facility built primarily to manufacture and assemble the new U.S. Army UH-72A Lakota light utility twin engine helicopter. Severstal North America opened a steel mini-mill in an adjacent site in October 2007 and immediately began construction on phase II, bringing total investment in the plant to $1.8 billion. Paccar, parent company of Peterbilt, Kenworth and DAF (Dutch) trucks, has operated a truck engine manufacturing facility since late 2010 that is located to the north of the airport. Other industries, many with international roots, continue to be located at the industrial park adjacent to the airport. The area has two "Megasites" adjacent to the airport that were certified under the Tennessee Valley Authority's Certified Megasite program. In addition, two aerospace companies, Aurora Flight Sciences and Stark Aerospace, built facilities on airport property and primarily manufacture unmanned aerial vehicles. Stark Aerospace is the newly formed subsidiary of Israel Aerospace Industries.

== History ==
Plans to build the airport at a cost of $2.2 million were announced by Senator John C. Stennis in August 1966. In December of the same year, the three local cities approved bond issues to pay $1,285,000 for the airport, with the remaining 45% of the project to be paid for by the federal government. The airport opened in 1971. Southern Airways had been serving the Columbus-Lowndes County Airport since 1949 and moved to GTR in September, 1971. Southern was merged into Republic Airlines in 1979 which continued service until 1985. Since then GTR has received service by several regional carriers operating on behalf of American Airlines, Northwest Airlines, and the current Delta Air Lines.

== Facilities and aircraft ==
Golden Triangle Regional Airport covers an area of 1,000 acres (405 ha) at an elevation of 264 feet (80 m) above mean sea level. It has one runway designated 18/36 with an asphalt surface measuring 8,003 by 150 feet (2,439 x 46 m). This runway is long enough to accommodate Boeing 757s and Boeing 767s used by college football teams visiting Mississippi State University and the Bulldogs home football games.

For the 12-month period ending March 31, 2023, the airport had 51,205 aircraft operations, an average of 140 per day: 74% military, 20% general aviation and 6% air taxi. At that time there were 37 aircraft based at this airport: 16 single-engine, 11 multi-engine, 5 jet, and 5 helicopter.

Because of the projected growth, since 2003 the airport has spent significant resources improving and upgrading the infrastructure. In 2003 a $1.6 million air traffic control tower was opened to maintain the safety of the flying operation and is manned under the FAA's Contract Tower Program. The runway was repaved and strengthened to take commercial aircraft up to a Boeing 757. Two additional parking ramps were constructed and the two existing ramps were rehabilitated. The terminal has had minor renovations but a major expansion was completed in 2010. A runway expansion from 6,497' to 8,000' was completed in June 2011.

The airport plans to expand the second floor waiting area and to install a jet bridge starting in the spring of 2023.

== Airlines and destinations ==
According to FlightAware, scheduled nonstop passenger service to Atlanta (ATL) is currently operated by Endeavor Air flying as the Delta Connection on behalf of Delta Air Lines with Bombardier CRJ900 regional jets.

Airlines	Destinations
American Eagle	Dallas/Fort Worth
Delta Connection	Atlanta

=== Statistics ===
Carrier shares (August 2024 – July 2025)
Carrier	Passengers (arriving and departing)
Endeavor Air	90,580(91.82%)
SkyWest Airlines	8,080(8.18%)

Top domestic destinations (August 2024 – July 2025)
Rank	City	Passengers	Airline
1	Atlanta, Georgia	45,780	Delta Connection
2	Dallas/Ft. Worth, Texas	4,030	American Eagle

== Airline history ==
Southern Airways was serving Columbus in 1952 with Douglas DC-3 aircraft operating six daily departures with three round trip services a day flying a routing of Atlanta - Gadsden, AL - Birmingham, AL - Tuscaloosa, AL - Columbus, MS - Tupelo, MS - Memphis. Southern would serve Columbus for many years and subsequently introduced Douglas DC-9-10 jet service at airport including five jet flights a day early in 1976 with direct one stop DC-9 service from Atlanta, Chicago O'Hare Airport, Memphis, and Hattiesburg–Laurel in addition to DC-9 nonstops from Tuscaloosa and Meridian, MS. According to the Official Airline Guide (OAG), at this same time in 1976 Southern was also operating flights into the airport with Martin 4-0-4 propliners with nonstop service from Memphis and Tupelo as well as direct one stop service from Atlanta while South Central Air Transport (SCAT), a commuter airline, was serving the airport as well with Handley Page Jetstream propjets nonstop from Jackson, MS and Tupelo with direct, no change of plane service from New Orleans.

Southern Airways then merged with North Central Airlines to form Republic Airlines which in turn was continuing to serve Columbus in late 1979 with all of its flights into the airport operated with jets including the Douglas DC-9-10 as well as the larger McDonnell Douglas DC-9-50 with nonstop DC-9 flights from Memphis and Tuscaloosa in addition to direct one stop DC-9 flights from Atlanta for a total of six jet flights every weekday. Republic also served the airport with McDonnell Douglas DC-9-30 jets and Convair 580 turboprops during the early and mid 1980s before ending its service to Columbus by 1986.

By early 1985, in addition to Republic's DC-9 jet service, Atlantic Southeast Airlines (ASA) had begun serving the airport as the Delta Connection on behalf of Delta Air Lines via a code sharing agreement with flights operated with Embraer EMB-110 Bandeirante commuter turboprops on nonstop flights from Atlanta, Memphis and Tuscaloosa.

Three airlines were serving Columbus in late 1989 including American Eagle (airline brand) operating code sharing service on behalf of American Airlines with nonstop flights from Nashville and Meridian flown with Fairchild Swearingen Metroliner commuter propjets, Delta Connection operated by Atlantic Southeast Airlines on behalf of Delta via a code sharing agreement with Embraer EMB-120 Brasilia commuter propjets nonstop from Atlanta and Tuscaloosa, and Northwest Airlink operated by Express Airlines I on a code sharing basis for Northwest Airlines with British Aerospace BAe Jetstream 31 and Saab 340 commuter propjets nonstop from Memphis and Tupelo.

In early 2006, Chautauqua Airlines, a Republic Airways Holdings company, operated flights under the Delta Connection banner via a code sharing agreement on behalf of Delta Air Lines. Until Delta ceased its hub operation at Dallas/Fort Worth (DFW) in February 2005, GTR had one flight per day to DFW. Four flights per day to Atlanta's Hartsfield-Jackson International Airport (ATL) operated by Atlantic Southeast Airlines (ASA) as Delta Connection code sharing service remained until late 2005. In 2006, there were three flights per day to ATL.

Mesaba Aviation operating code sharing service as Northwest Airlink on behalf of Northwest Airlines flew to Memphis from GTR, but they ceased these operations in 2003 citing a desire to not compete with the new regional jet service being started by ASA as they replaced their Embraer EMB-120 fleet.

With the acquisition of Northwest Airlines by Delta Air Lines in 2008, Delta took over the Northwest hub in Memphis (MEM). On January 27, 2009 Delta announced the resumption of service between GTR and Memphis on Mesaba Airlines, now operating as a Delta Connection carrier. The new service began on May 4, 2009 and supplemented the Atlantic Southeast Airlines service to Atlanta. In 2010, Pinnacle Airlines began flying Canadair CRJ200 regional jets as Delta Connection began phasing out Saab 340 turboprop aircraft from their fleet.

In June 2019, Delta Connection added a fourth flight to Atlanta, an early afternoon flight.

== See also ==
- List of airports in Mississippi
