= Airbus Helicopters, Inc. =

- Company type: Subsidiary
- Industry: Aerospace
- Founded: 1969
- Headquarters: Grand Prairie, Texas, United States
- Key people: Romain Trapp, President of Airbus Helicopters, Inc. and Head of the North America Region
- Products: Helicopters
- Number of employees: 780
- Parent: Airbus
- Website: http://airbushelicoptersinc.com

Airbus Helicopters, Inc. (AHI) is a subsidiary of Airbus. Airbus Helicopters manufactures and markets a broad range of civil helicopters. With large facilities in Texas and Mississippi and service centers throughout the country, Airbus Helicopters, Inc. has a U.S. footprint of over 860,000 square feet (79,900 m^{2}) and controls over 50% of the U.S. market.

== History ==
The company's history goes back to the now-defunct LTV Corporation. In 1968, Vought Helicopter Inc. (VHI), a subsidiary of LTV, built a facility at the Grand Prairie Municipal Airport in Grand Prairie, Texas, for the purpose of marketing helicopters to North America built by Aérospatiale, the French helicopter manufacturer. However, six years later Aérospatiale bought out VHI and took over its own marketing; two years later it changed VHI's name to Aérospatiale Helicopter Corporation (AHC). In 1980, AHC built its current Grand Prairie facility.

In 1992, DASA of Germany and Aérospatiale merged to form Eurocopter; AHC would become American Eurocopter.

In 2004, the facility in Columbus, Mississippi was opened and in 2006, became the manufacturing facility and home for the U.S. Army's UH-72A Lakota helicopter. The company was renamed Airbus Helicopters, Inc. on January 2, 2014.

== US production plants ==
Airbus Helicopters produces helicopters at two production plants in the US.

- Grand Prairie, Texas
  - Grand Prairie serves as the headquarters and main facility for Airbus Helicopters. It is adjacent to Grand Prairie Municipal Airport.
  - Grand Prairie also serves as the Airbus Helicopters Training facility for North America with classrooms and full-motion simulators.
- Columbus, Mississippi
  - The recently constructed Columbus plant handles repairs, upgrades and customizations of all Airbus Helicopters models. It is located on the Golden Triangle Regional Airport.
  - The Columbus facility is also the home of the UH-72A Lakota (military EC145), the new Army helicopter.
  - Beginning in 2014, Airbus Helicopters will upgrade the Columbus Plant to a final assembly and test site for AS350 helicopters. The plant plans to produce up to 60 additional AS350 helicopters annually by 2016.
