= Eurocopter UH-72 Lakota =

Light utility multipurpose helicopter

UH-72 Lakota
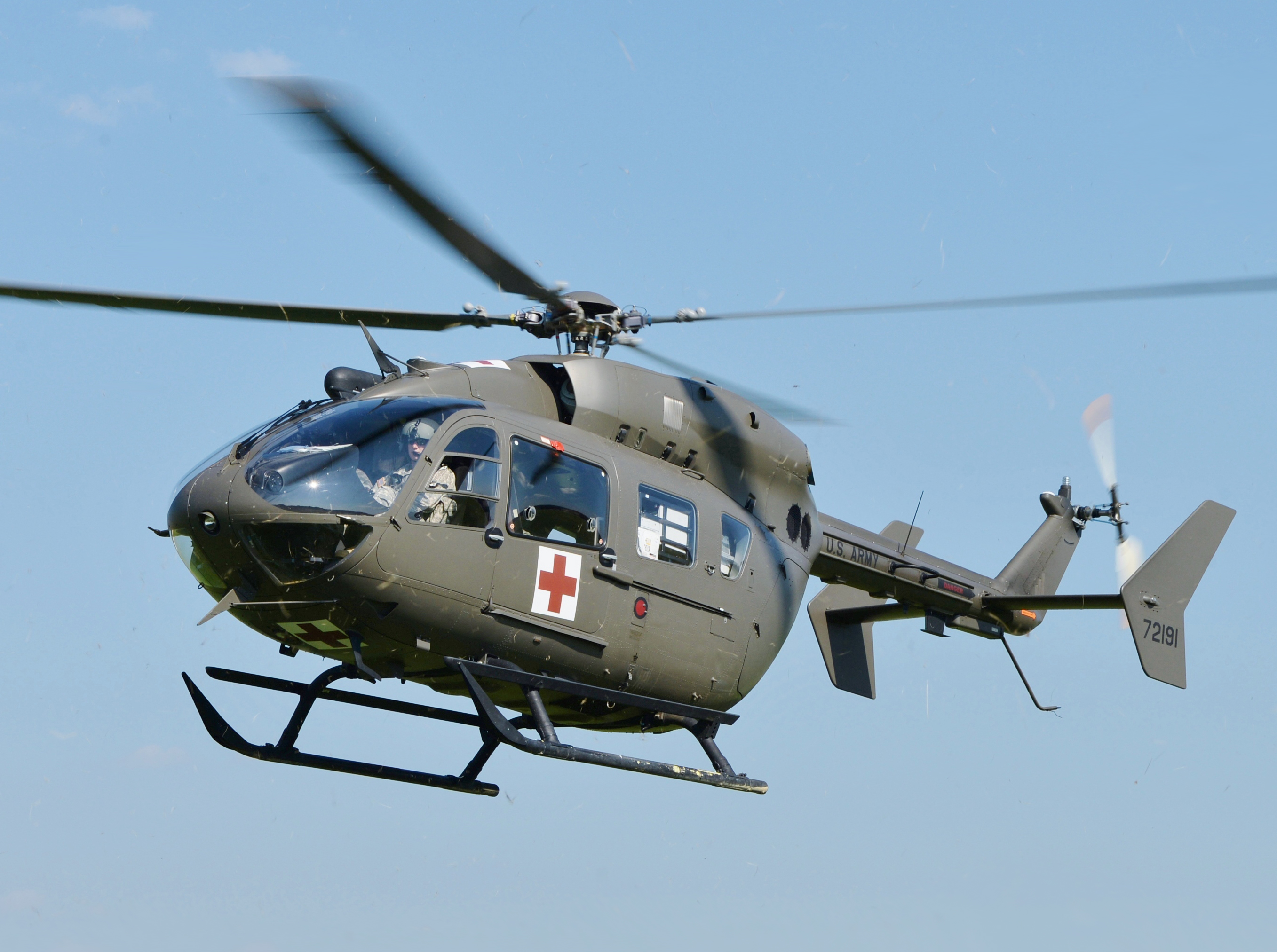
- A Nebraska Army National Guard Lakota, participating in exercise PATRIOT North 2016

General information
- Type: Light utility military helicopter
- National origin: Multinational
- Manufacturer: Eurocopter; Airbus Helicopters
- Built by: American Eurocopter; Airbus Helicopters, Inc.
- Status: In service
- Primary users: United States Army United States Navy
- Number built: 463 (September 2020)

History
- Manufactured: 2006–present
- Introduction date: 2007
- First flight: 2006
- Developed from: Eurocopter EC145

The Airbus Helicopters (formerly Eurocopter) UH-72 Lakota is a twin-engine helicopter with a single, four-bladed main rotor. It is a militarized version of the Eurocopter EC145, Airbus Helicopters, Inc., a division of the Airbus Group. Since their introduction in 2006, several hundred of various types have entered service by the 2020s.

Initially marketed as the UH-145, the helicopter was selected as the winner of the United States Army's Light Utility Helicopter (LUH) program in June 2006. In October 2006, American Eurocopter was awarded a production contract for 345 aircraft to replace the aging Bell UH-1H/V Iroquois and Bell OH-58A/C Kiowa helicopters in the US Army and Army National Guard fleets. The UH-72 performs non-combat logistics and support missions within the US for homeland security, disaster response missions, and medical evacuations. This allows the more expensive Sikorsky UH-60 Black Hawks and other types to be freed up for frontline service. The UH-72A is also used for helicopter pilot training.

In the 2020s, the updated UH-72B version with upgrades and a distinct ducted tail rotor began to enter service. The helicopter is noted for its lower procurement and operating costs, and deliveries are noted as being on-budget and on-time to the U.S. Army. The B model with five-blade rotors (four blades for the A model) is the latest model, entering service in 2021. Tests of an unmanned version were conducted. An armed scout version was entered in the U.S. Army's Armed Aerial Scout competition, though that program was cancelled in 2014 due to budget cuts. By 2022, over 460 aircraft had been produced, including the A and B models.

== Development ==
=== Background ===
The U.S. Army's LHX program began in the early 1980s, proposing two helicopter designs with a high percentage of commonality of dynamic components. One was a light utility version ("LHX-U") for assault and tactical movement of troops and supplies, the other was a light scout/attack version ("LHX-SCAT") to complement the growing development of the AH-64 Apache. As the program was developed, the light utility version was dropped and focus was placed on the light attack reconnaissance version, which eventually became the RAH-66 Comanche.

In 2004, the U.S. Department of Defense and the US Army made the decision to terminate the RAH-66 program. As part of the termination, the Army retained the future years' funding intended for the Comanche. To replace the capability of the cancelled Comanche, the US Army planned several programs, including three new aircraft. The Army Staff decided that these three aircraft, the Armed Reconnaissance Helicopter (ARH), the Light Utility Helicopter (LUH), and the Future Cargo Aircraft (FCA) (later renamed Joint Cargo Aircraft, or JCA), were to be existing, in-production commercial aircraft modified for Army service.

=== LUH Program and UH-145 ===
The LUH program was initiated in early 2004, with an initial requirement for 322 helicopters to conduct homeland security, administrative, logistic, medical evacuation (MEDEVAC) and support of the army test and training centers missions. The LUH contract was released in July 2005. At least five proposals were received, including the Bell 210 and Bell 412, MD Explorer, and AgustaWestland AW139. EADS North America (EADS NA) marketed the UH-145 variant of the EC 145 for the program.

In June 2006, the UH-145 won the $3 billion LUH contract. In August, the UH-145 was designated UH-72A by the Department of Defense. The award was confirmed in October 2006 following protests from losing bidders. Despite a four-month delay due to the protests, the first UH-72 was delivered on time in December, when the name Lakota was announced for the type, following the service's tradition of giving Native American names to its helicopters.

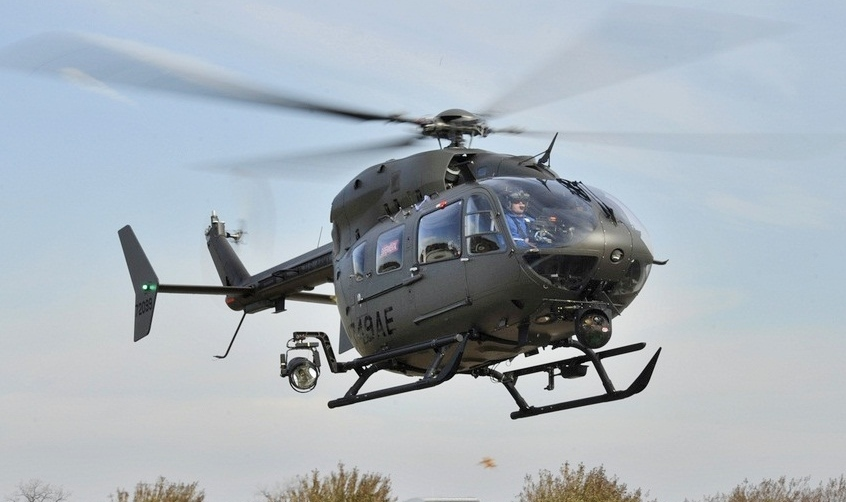
A UH-72A at the Pentagon, 2010

In August 2007, the UH-72A received full-rate production (FRP) approval to produce an initially planned fleet of 345 aircraft through 2017. The UH-72A is produced at Airbus Helicopters's facility in Columbus, Mississippi. Initial production was assembly of kits received from Eurocopter Deutschland but full local production was reached in 2009. In December 2009, the service ordered 45 more UH-72As.

The 100th Lakota was delivered in March 2010, and the 250th was delivered in April 2013. That month, the U.S. Army opted to halt procurement after 2014 due to budget cuts. At that point, a total of 312 Lakotas were on order by the service. In January 2014, Congress gave the Army $171 million to procure 20 additional UH-72As. The 300th UH-72 was delivered to the Army in May 2014.

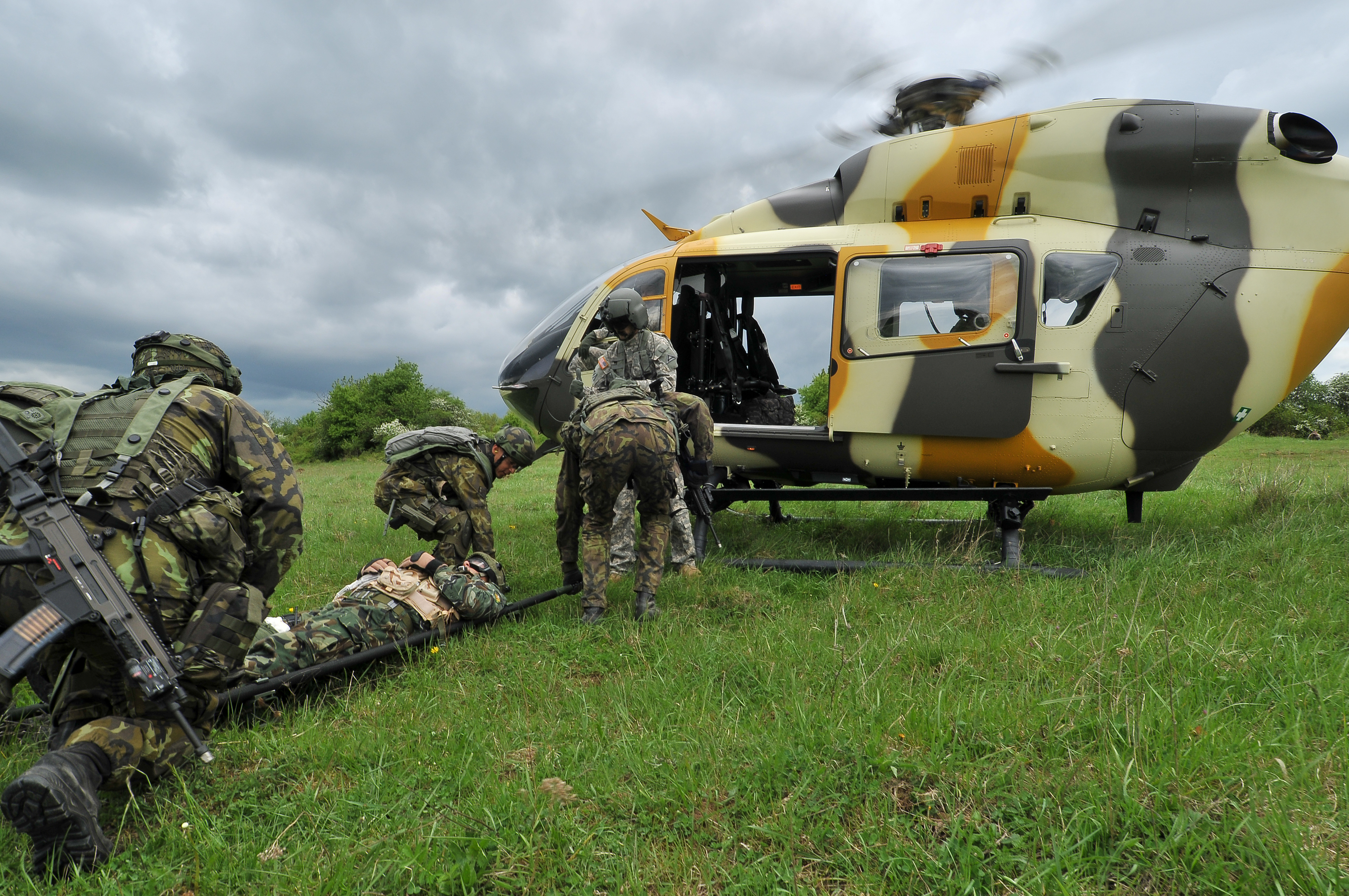
A UH-72A during NATO Operational Mentor Liaison Team Training Exercise XXIII in 2010, practicing evacuation of a simulated casualty

In May 2013, Congress questioned why the UH-72 had not been considered for the armed scout role. The Army Chief of Staff General Ray Odierno stated that the UH-72A was developed for domestic operations and is not considered to be operationally deployable to combat zones. The UH-72 is employed by the US Army National Guard in a utility role in the US, releasing UH-60 Black Hawk helicopters to deploy overseas.

In June 2013, Under Secretary of Defense for Acquisition, Technology and Logistics Frank Kendall stated in a letter to Congress that UH-72 combat modifications were "presently unaffordable". Fleet-wide combat modifications would reportedly cost $780 million and add 774 lb (351 kg) of weight per helicopter. Changes would include passive and active survivability systems, hardened engines and drivetrain, external lighting and communications upgrades.

=== Trainer use ===
Since 2009 the U.S. Navy has operated several UH-72As along with TH-67 Creeks at the Naval Test Pilot School. These replaced TH-6 Cayuses. In 2011, the Navy UH-72As were equipped with special avionics to support training for students.

In December 2013, the US Army was considering retiring its OH-58 Kiowa fleet and transferring all Army National Guard and US Army Reserve AH-64 Apaches to the active Army to serve as scout helicopters. With this plan, all 100 active Army UH-72s along with 104 Army National Guard UH-72s would be transferred for use as training helicopters, replacing the Bell TH-67 Creek at the United States Army Aviation Center of Excellence at Fort Rucker, Alabama. Some active Army Sikorsky UH-60 Black Hawks would be transferred to Army Reserve and Army National Guard units for homeland defense and disaster response missions. The proposals aim to retire older helicopters to substantially reduce costs while retaining crucial capabilities. With the prospect of most UH-72s being repurposed as training helicopters, the Army requested funds to buy 100 more Lakotas to add to the training fleet. The FY2015 budget covered 55 helicopters, and the funds from FY2016 were to be used to complete the purchase.

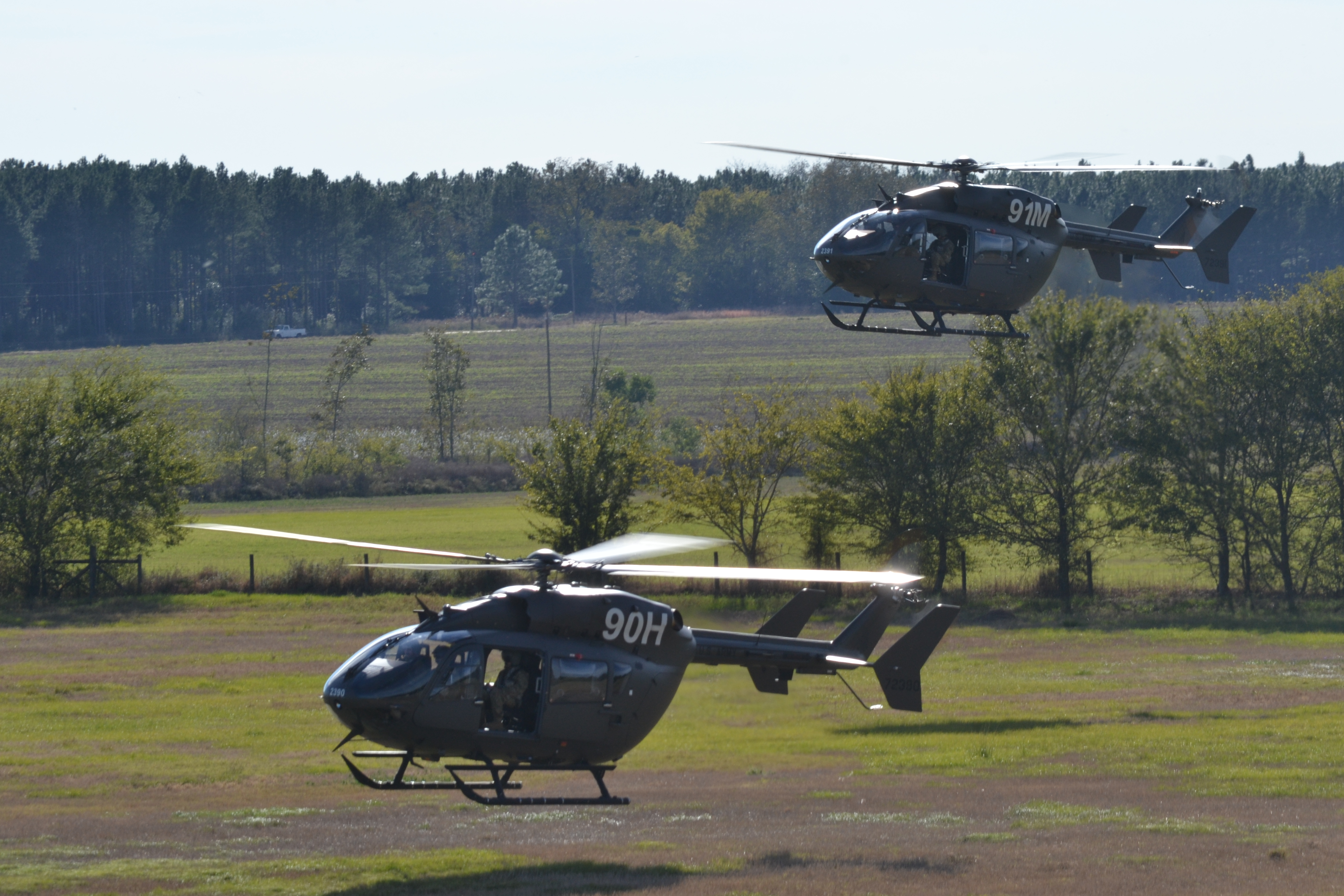
Two UH-72As trainers maneuvering in formation close to the ground.

In September 2014, the Army issued a notice of intention to buy up to 155 UH-72s for training "on an other than full and open competitive basis". AgustaWestland launched a judicial bid to have the acquisition declared unlawful, claiming that the EC145 did not offer the best value for money and that its "restricted flight maneuver envelope" impeded training. Airbus defended the Army's position, noting the EC145's prior selection, claiming AgustaWestland's cost figures were exaggerated and that it was already used for training.

Bell Helicopter also criticized the decision but took no legal actions. In October 2014, a Federal Claims Court issued a temporary order denying the US government's challenge of AgustaWestland's action until the Army issued a final justification and approval (J&A) to sole-source the procurement. The Army contended that the UH-72A came under the 2006 LUH contract, and so did not require a new J&A, effectively nullifying the challenge.

The court sided with AgustaWestland, rejected the Army's J&A, and halted UH-72 procurement for training after finding that the Army had exaggerated the costs and time needed to acquire a training helicopter. The initial acquisition process was found negligent as it effectively tied the UH-72 to Airbus for its serviceable life. The court ordered the Army to either conduct a procurement for new training helicopters, or stop buying UH-72 trainers. The Army appealed the decision. The lawsuit was overturned on appeal in favor of the US Army in 2018. The Army retired its last TH-67 trainer in 2021.

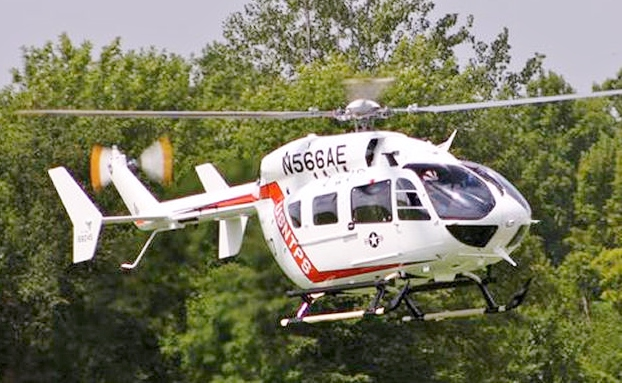
A US Navy UH-72A from the US Naval Test Pilot School fleet

The UH-72 has faced controversy as a trainer due to perceived problems with its use as an initial trainer. A study by the National Commission on the Future of the Army, a commission established by Congress to make recommendations on force structure of the Army to the president, concluded that the UH-72 was cost-prohibitive as a training helicopter and there were cheaper options available to buy. It also showed that most instructor pilots disapproved of the UH-72, deeming it "too much aircraft for the mission", and unsuitable as an initial entry trainer.

The UH-72 has also been criticized as unable to teach touchdown auto-rotations, among other maneuvers. The German Army had stopped using EC-135s for their initial trainer after Airbus advised them of it not being suitable for initial training. The US Navy rejected the UH-72 as a trainer for the same reason. By 2024, the US Army was looking at alternatives to the UH-72 as a trainer due to cost and complexity, only three years after it took over from the preceding TH-67 helicopter it replaced.

=== Proposed uses ===
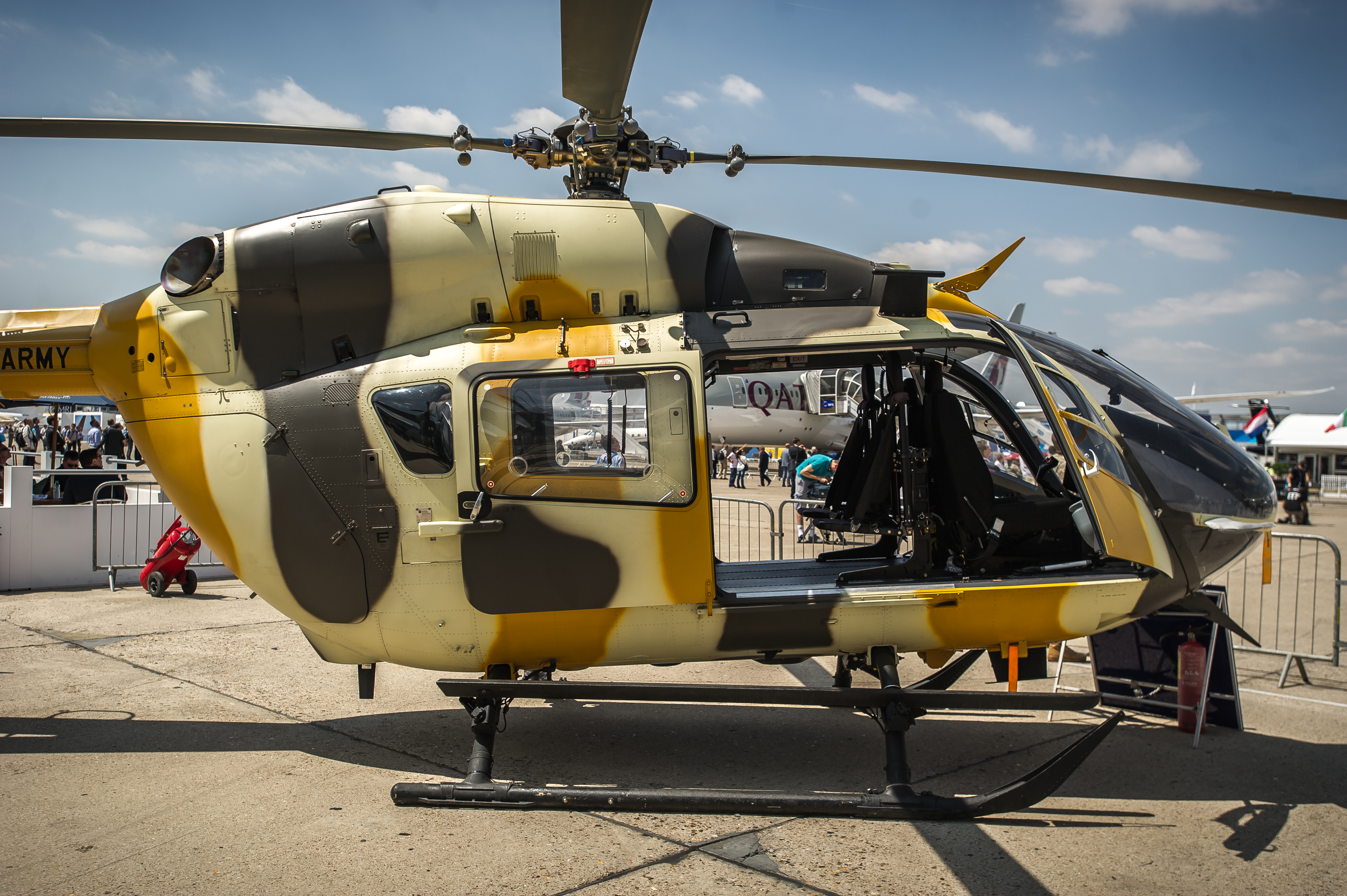
A UH-72A Lakota at the 2015 Paris Air Show

The Armed Scout 645 (EC645) was a proposed armed UH-72 variant for the US Army's Armed Aerial Scout (AAS) program to replace the OH-58D. In May 2009, EADS and Lockheed Martin announced a teaming agreement for the 645. Three AAS-72X demonstrators were built and began flight testing in late 2010. In September 2012, EADS began voluntary flight demonstrations of both an AAS-72X and an EC145 T2, reportedly meeting with performance requirements. Two versions were offered: the AAS-72X, an armed version of the UH-72; and the AAS-72X+, an armed militarized version of the EC-145T2. In late 2013, the AAS program was terminated.

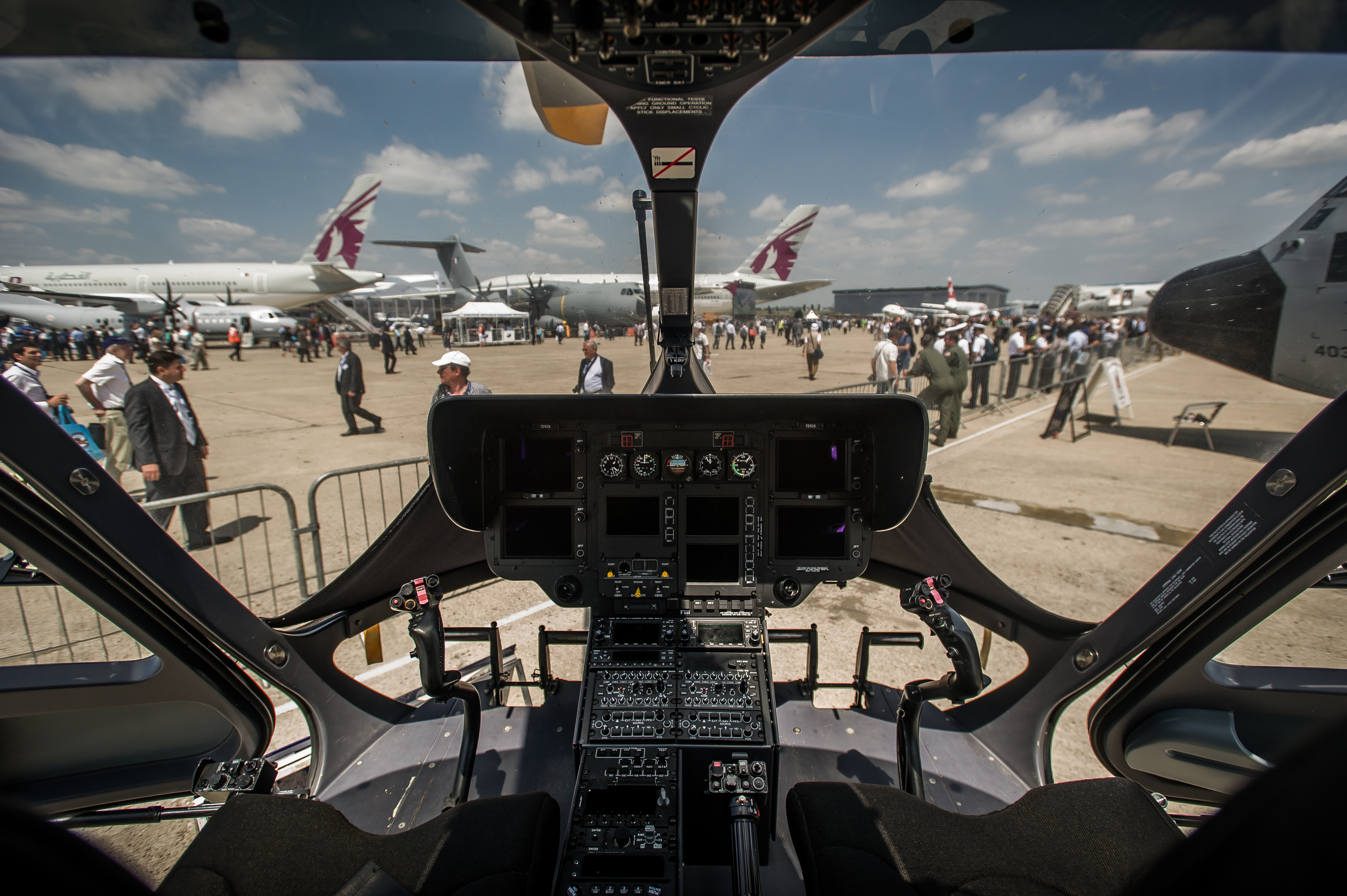
A UH-72A Lakota cockpit at the 2015 Paris Air Show

In May 2012, the UH-72A was submitted in the US Air Force's Common Vertical Life Support Platform (CVLSP) program for a UH-1N Twin Huey replacement. As with the US Army, the UH-72A can operate in permissive environments, such as ICBM site support and security under the Air Force Global Strike Command, and personnel transport in the National Capital Region by the Air Mobility Command's 89th Airlift Wing. Advantages over the UH-1N include 30 percent more speed, range, and loiter time, enhanced reliability and crashworthiness, night vision compatibility, modern avionics, and being cheaper to operate. In August 2013, the USAF said it planned to sustain the UH-1N for six to ten more years.

In September 2013, acting Air Force Secretary Eric Fanning received a letter from the CEO of EADS North America, arguing that to refit and maintain the Hueys costs more than to acquire and operate UH-72As; the letter also urged prompt action as Army orders were almost complete and production was winding down. The USAF said it had insufficient funding for such a procurement and can risk using Hueys for a while. EADS North America stated that the UH-72A "will lower the risk to the U.S. Air Force nuclear enterprise, and will save taxpayers the considerable cost of future recapitalization." Reportedly, buying UH-72As would cost as much as upgrading 62 Hueys, but long-term operating costs would be much lower.

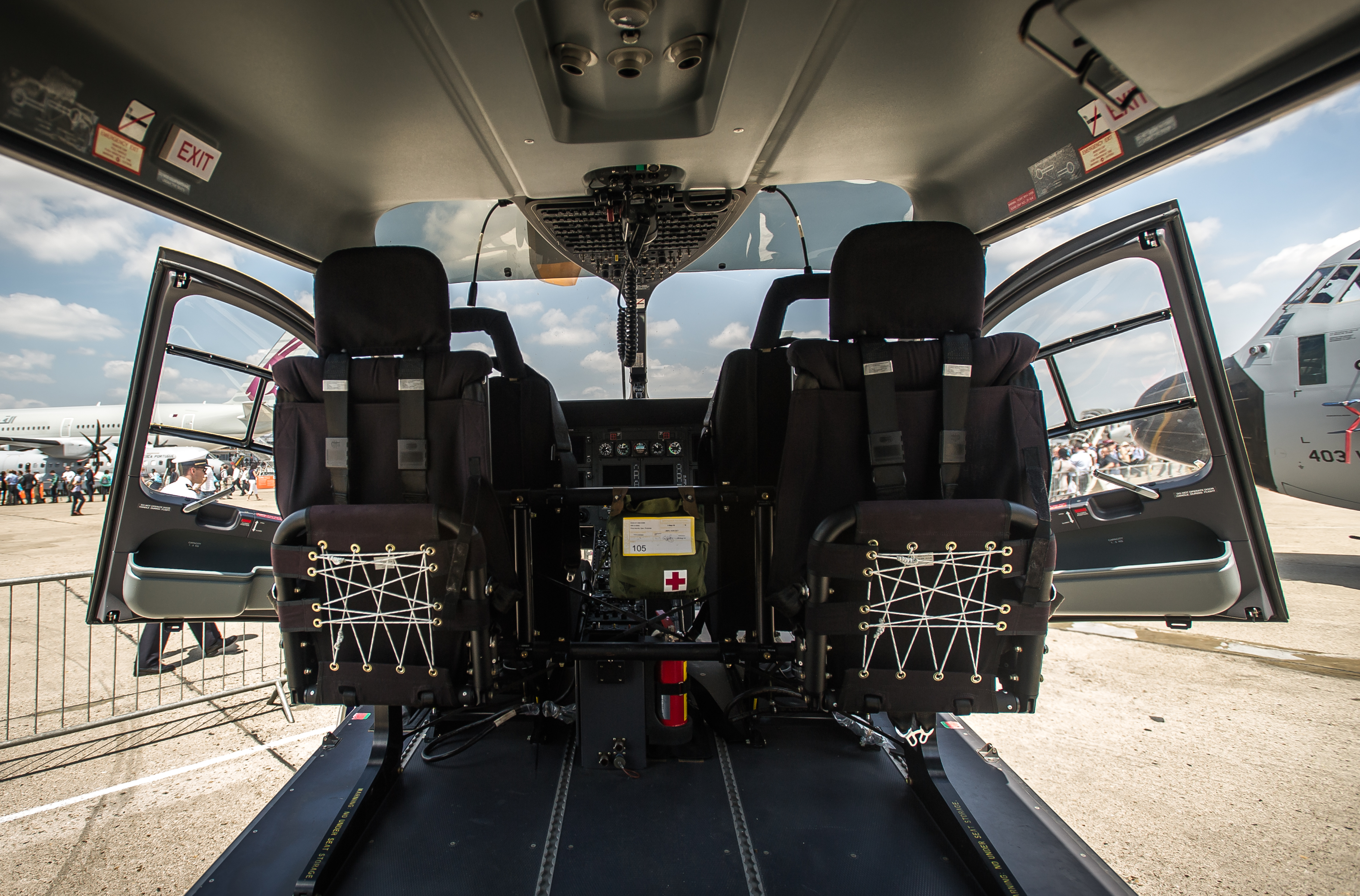
Rear seat looking forward at the 2015 Paris Air Show

In April 2024, Airbus unveiled the UH-72B Unmanned Logistics Connector, an unmanned version of the UH-72B. It is being proposed as an uncrewed logistics platform for the United States Marine Corps (USMC) and United States Army. Its proposal to the USMC addresses aerial logistics needs in the Pacific relating to Expeditionary Advanced Base Operations. Its proposal to the Army addresses the need for a VTOL logistics aircraft for contested airspace, which came alongside the recent Army cancellation of the Future Attack Reconnaissance Aircraft and ending of the UH-60V production.

A scale model of the helicopter was displayed at the Sea Air Space maritime exposition in April 2024. Airbus US Space & Defense Business Development manager Carl Forsling stated that the UH-72B ULC could be fielded as early as the late 2020s as an affordable and low-risk option for the USMC. In April 2024, Craig Dupuy, Airbus' senior director of business development and strategy at Grand Prairie, stated:

We're pretty close to knowing if we'll be on contract or not; it's a middle-tier acquisition, so they've conveyed to industry that they have five years from initial award to put something in the field. We're trying to determine right now, what is our future? What is our pathway? The biggest opportunity that we see right now for the future is getting into uncrewed logistics for the Army or the Marine Corps. There's a lot of interest in the platform, just from a value [proposition] piece, a cabin size piece. That's where we're being pointed to go and look and say, is this a future path for this aircraft?

The UH-72B ULC will be able to carry up to 4,000 lb of Joint Modular Intermodal Containers and Naval Strike Missile containers, alongside other related cargo.

== Design ==
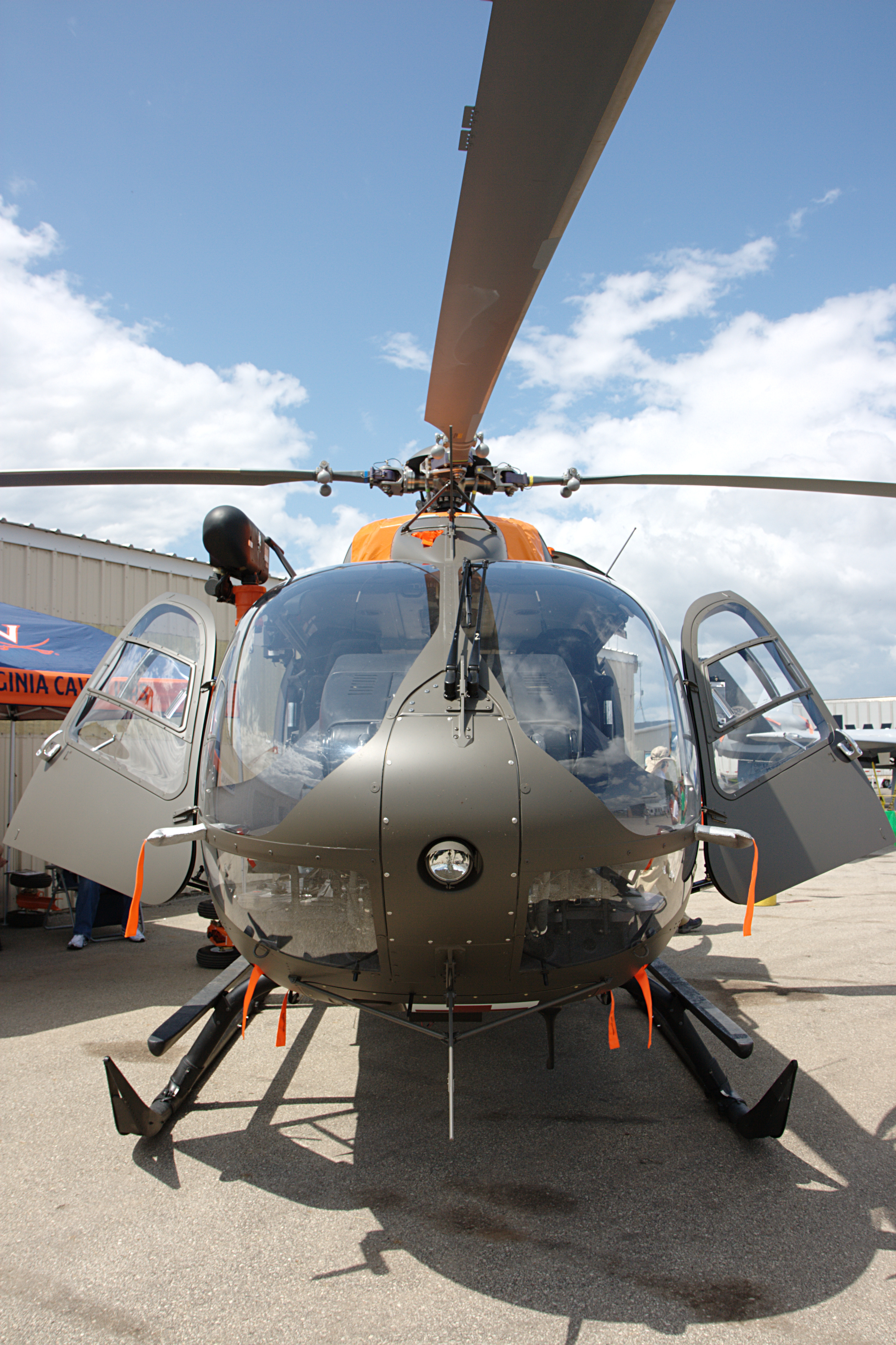
A head on view of a UH-72, 2009

The initial model entered service with a traditional tail rotor, 4-blade main rotor, twin engines and a clam shell rear access. The B-model uses a 5-bladed rotor and ducted fan tail rotor, and enhanced avionics and engines.

The UH-72 is designed to take on a range of missions, from general support and medical evacuation (MEDEVAC) to personnel recovery and counter-narcotics operations. They are planned to replace the UH-1 and OH-58A/C, which are older light utility helicopters, and supplant other types in domestic use, primarily those in Army National Guard service. The UH-72 is being procured as a commercial off-the-shelf (COTS) product, which simplifies logistics support of the fleet. EADS NA has teamed with Sikorsky to provide Contractor Logistics Support (CLS) for the UH-72, through its Helicopter Support, Inc. (HSI)/Sikorsky Aerospace Maintenance (SAM) subsidiaries.

The basic UH-72A is simply a commercial EC145 helicopter that has a US Army color scheme and is fitted with an AN/ARC-231 radio. Other than utility transport, the Lakota can be configured for medical evacuation, VIP transport, security and support, and opposing forces training. It is described as the best military aircraft in the inventory for domestic operations, used by the Army National Guard for state support, disaster relief, and homeland defense and by non-deployed active units for MEDEVAC and training.

Compared to the previous UH-1 Huey used in those roles, the twin-engine Lakota flies faster at 145 kn (269 km/h; 167 mph) versus 124 kn (230 km/h; 143 mph), has an external hoist system, and has a fully integrated computerized cockpit. The Huey has an advantage in the MEDEVAC role, being able to carry three patients compared to the Lakota's two-patient load, but an average evacuation typically deals with two or fewer patients.

The Security & Support Mission Equipment Package (S&S MEP) equipped on the UH-72A allows for homeland security, counter-drug, and border patrol missions to be performed. This package includes an electro-optical/infrared sensor and laser pointer turret, moving map system and touch-screen displays, video management system, digital video recorded and datalink, searchlight, and rescue hoist from the MEDEVAC package.

The upgraded UH-72B model, which harnessed improvements in the mainstream civilian model, featured a number of changes such as a fenestron tail rotor (ducted fan), more powerful engines, FADEC, and enhanced avionics. The B model has a fully automated FADEC for engine control, which reduces the possibility of a hot start.

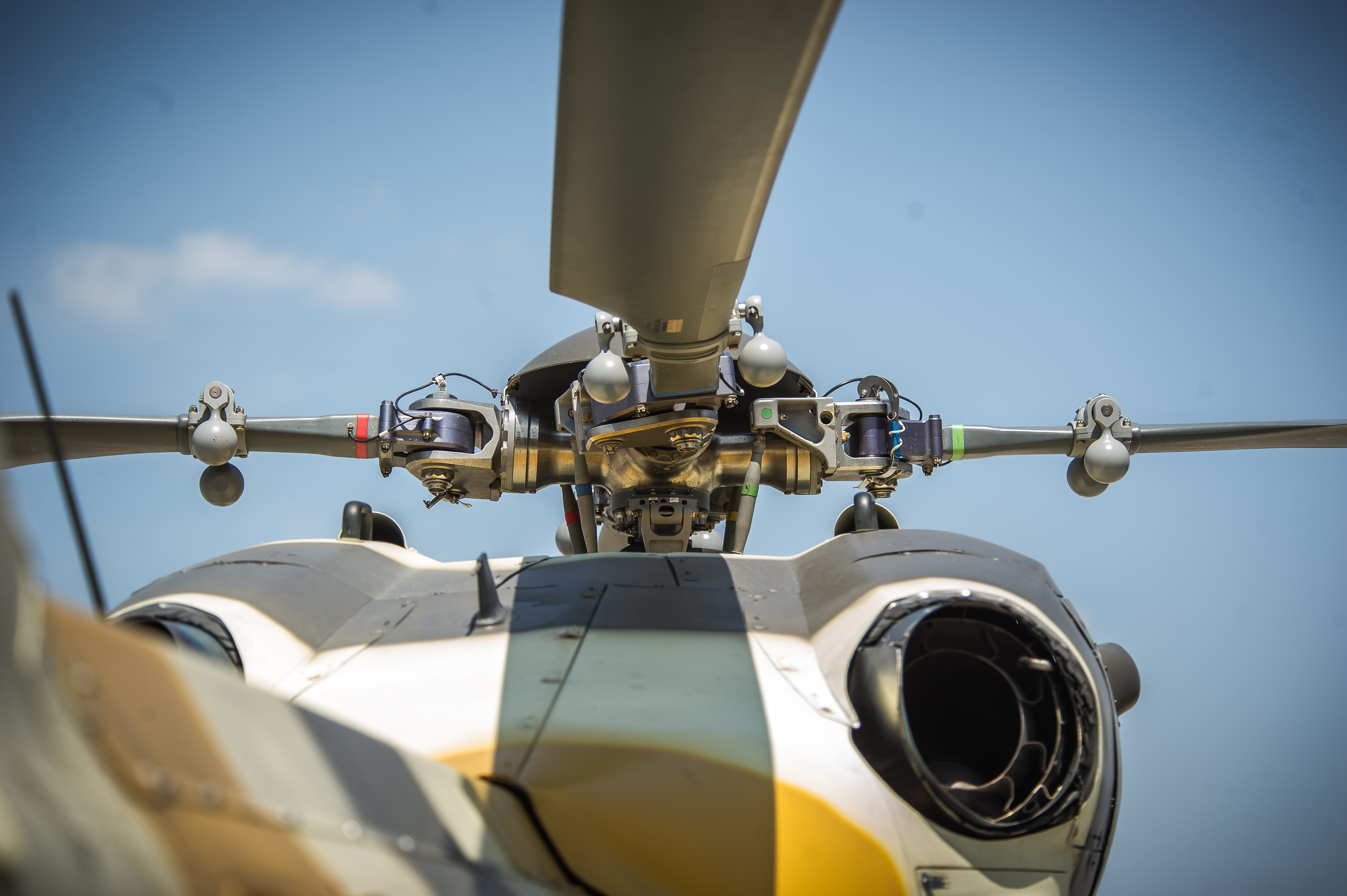
The rotors and engine exhaust

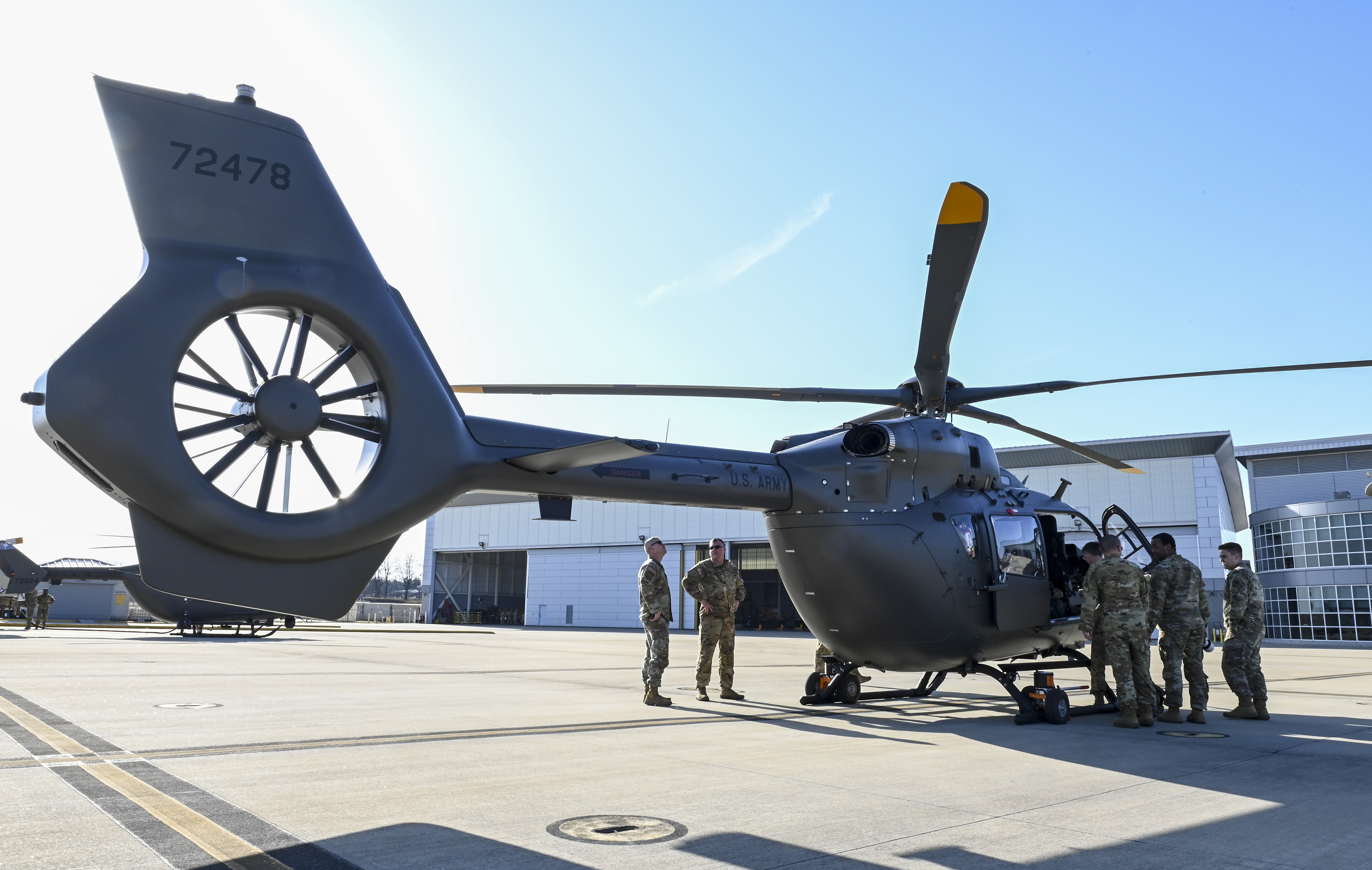
The UH-72B features a ducted tail-rotor commonly known as Fenestron and a five-bladed main rotor.

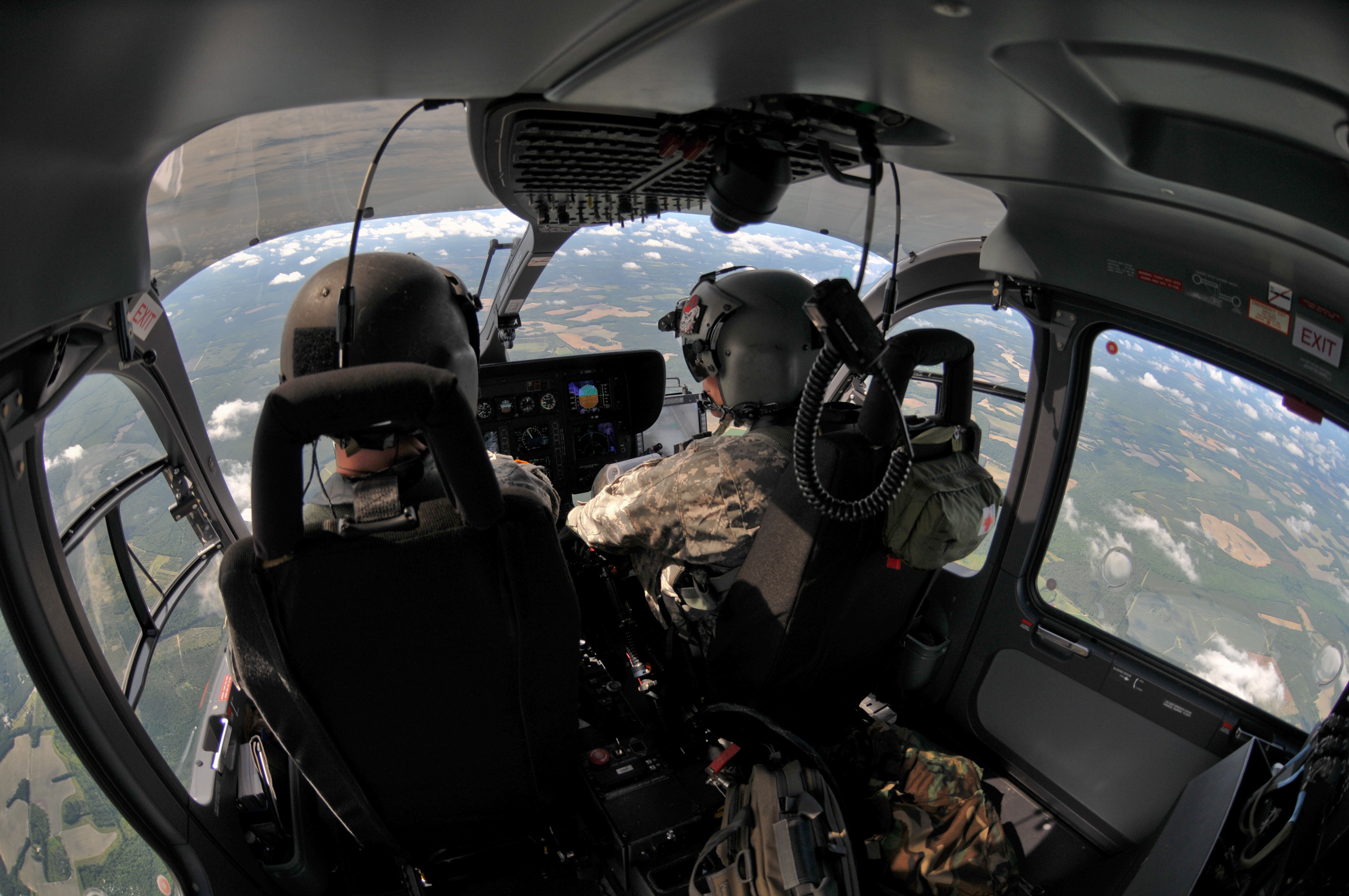
A fisheye cabin view of a Lakota

== Operational history ==
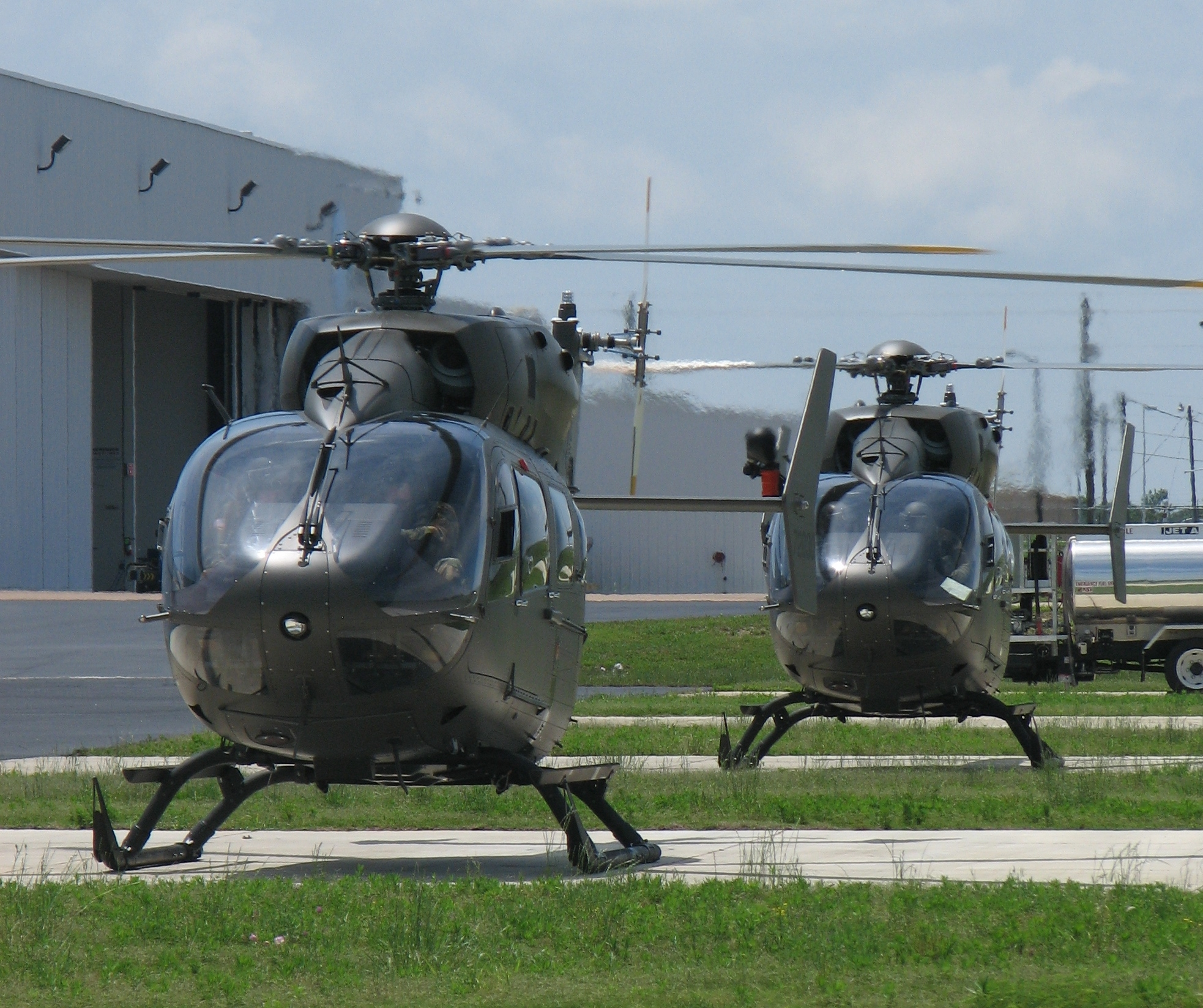
The first two Army National Guard UH-72As at Tupelo, Mississippi

The first aircraft was delivered to the US Army on 11 December 2006 in Columbus, Mississippi. On 12 December 2006, General Richard A. Cody, Vice Chief of Staff of the Army, and Joe Red Cloud, a chief of the Oglala Sioux Tribe, Lakota nation, accepted the first UH-72A in an official ceremony. The service estimated that delivery of the planned 345 aircraft would continue until 2017.

The first production helicopters were sent to the National Training Center (NTC), Fort Irwin, California for medical evacuation missions in January 2007. In June 2007, the NTC's US Army Air Ambulance Detachment (USAAAD) became the first operational unit to field the Lakota. In July 2007, the Training and Doctrine Command (TRADOC) Flight Detachment at Fort Eustis, Virginia became the second US Army unit fielded with the UH-72A.

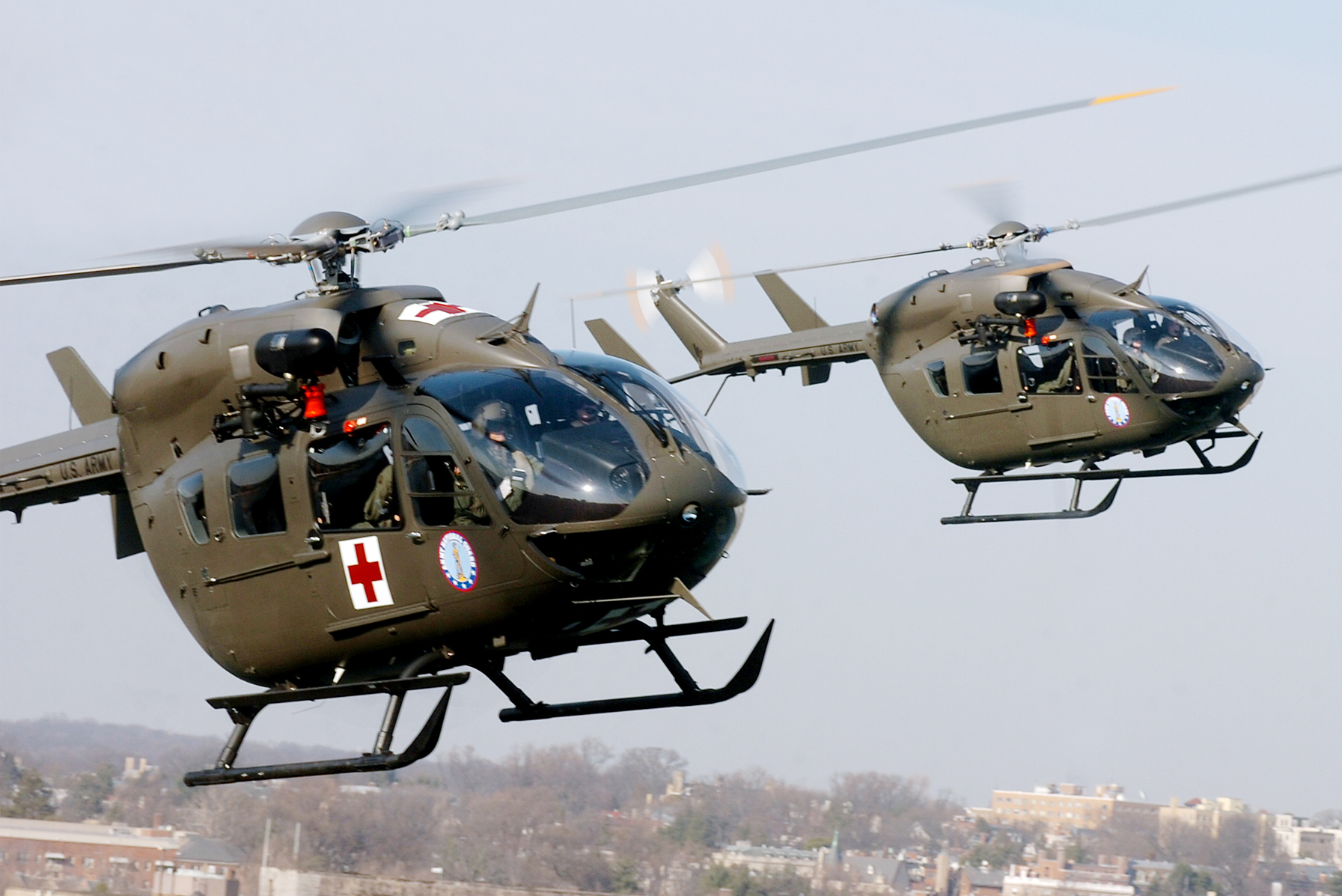
Army medical evacuation UH-72A helicopters in 2009

An August 2007 report by the Operational Test and Evaluation Directorate (DOT&E) noted that although the Lakota "...is effective in the performance of light utility missions," it was prone to overheating during operations in the desert conditions of Fort Irwin when not equipped with air conditioning systems. In response, vents were added in the doors to increase cabin air flow; air conditioning has been installed on some Medical and VIP versions, as well as added air conditioning units for crew comfort.

In September 2007, The Joint Readiness Training Center (JRTC) located at Fort Polk, Louisiana received their first aircraft. In January 2009, the United States Military Academy received two UH-72As, replacing two UH-1H helicopters for VIP transport to and from the academy. The helicopters also support the cadet parachute team and cadet training missions. The US Naval Test Pilot School received the first of five UH-72As in September 2009. The UH-72A replaced the TH-6B Cayuse as the prime training aircraft for the test pilot school's helicopter curriculum.

By March 2010, the Lakota entered service in Puerto Rico, Kwajalein Atoll, and the US Army's missile test range in Germany. On 20 December 2010, a UH-72A assigned to the Puerto Rico Army National Guard became the first UH-72A to experience a fatal accident. The aircraft crashed at sea off the coast of Puerto Rico and all six personnel aboard were killed.

A UH-72A takes off after refueling on a fire-fighting mission in Colorado, 2013

In July 2012, the US Army's Aviation Flight Test Directorate received three UH-72As at Redstone Arsenal, Huntsville, Alabama. They are used for general support and as chase aircraft to support aviation development testing. With this delivery, the service has received over 200 UH-72As. In September 2012, the Oregon Army National Guard's Detachment 1, C Company, 1–112 Aviation, received the first of four UH-72A helicopters during a roll-out ceremony at Camp Rilea in Warrenton, Oregon.

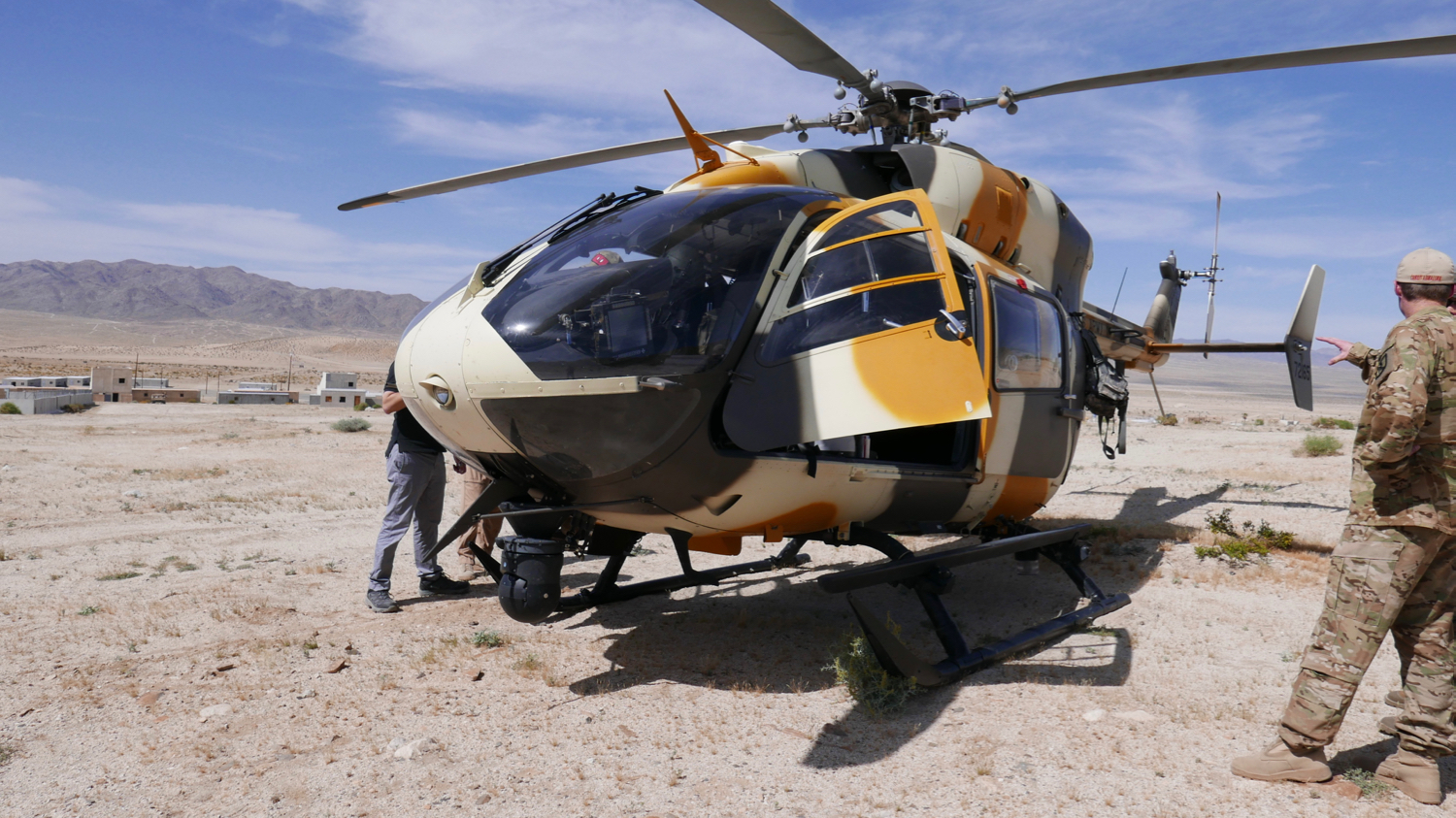
A UH-72 of 2916th BN provides air support to OPFOR units of the 11th ACR in 2019.

In March 2015, Airbus completed assembly of the first UH-72A made specifically for training for the US Army. The training configuration of the Lakota includes an observer seat for the instructor, a "buzz number" on its side for easy identification, and a flight control system that allows it to communicate with Fort Rucker. As part of the Army's aviation restructure initiative, Fort Rucker's fleet of TH-67 training helicopters will be replaced with 187 UH-72s, comprising 106 purpose-built trainers and 81 existing versions that will be modified.

By 2017, 400 UH-72As had been delivered to the U.S. Army, with all deliveries on time and on budget, coming from the Mississippi facility, that uniquely employs 40% veterans in its workforce.

In 2018, the 1–376th AVN BN was deployed to Germany with UH-72A Lakotas supporting MEDEVAC missions at Hohenfels and Grafenwoehr military bases. The Lakotas took over the mission from 214th Aviation Battalion Black Hawks, in the first deployment of the Lakota outside the US.

In the 2020s, the upgraded UH-72B model began to enter service, with number of upgrades including a fenestron tail rotor, more powerful engines, full authority digital engine control (FADEC), and avionics.

=== Export ===
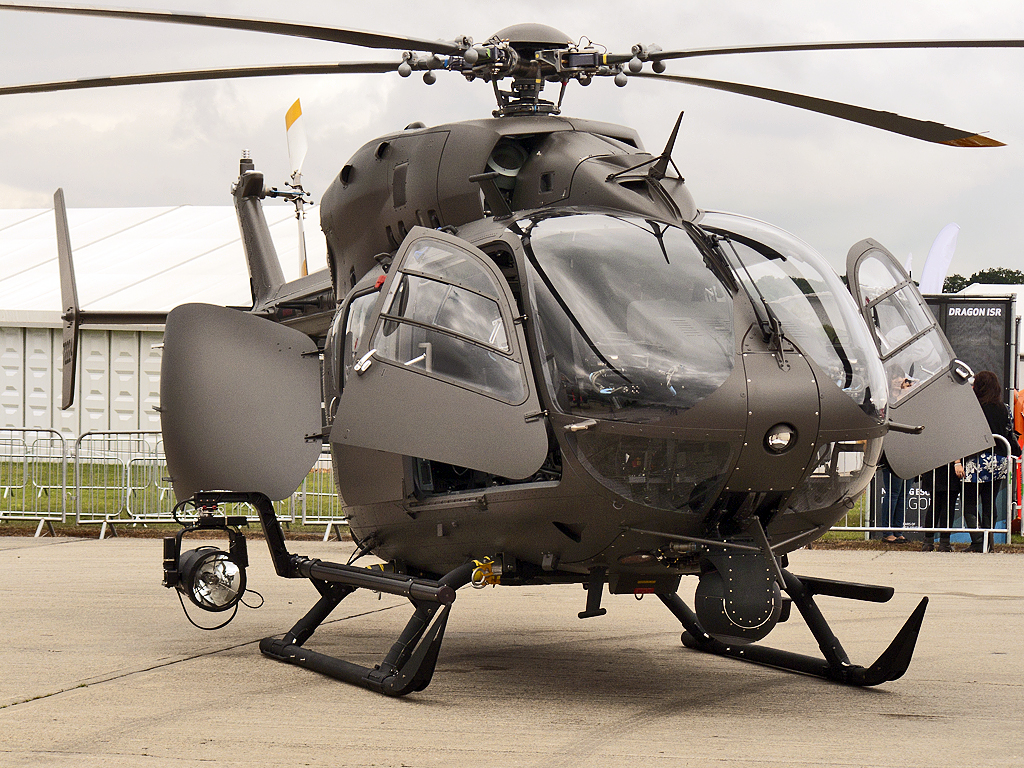
A UH-72A Lakota, search and support variant, at the 2012 Farnborough International Airshow

In June 2013, Thailand requested the sale of six UH-72A Lakotas with associated equipment, training, and support for an estimated cost of $77 million. In October 2013, the Thai government approved $55 million in funds to support the Royal Thai Army's acquisition of six UH-72A helicopters from 2013 to 2015.

In March 2014, the Thai Army awarded a $34 million contract to Airbus Helicopter for six UH-72As, fitted with a mission equipment package including the AN/ARC-231 airborne radio terminal; deliveries were to begin by April 2015. By November 2015, the six helicopters had been delivered.

In September 2014, Congress was notified of a Thailand request for the sale of another nine UH-72s, related equipment, and support.

== Variants ==
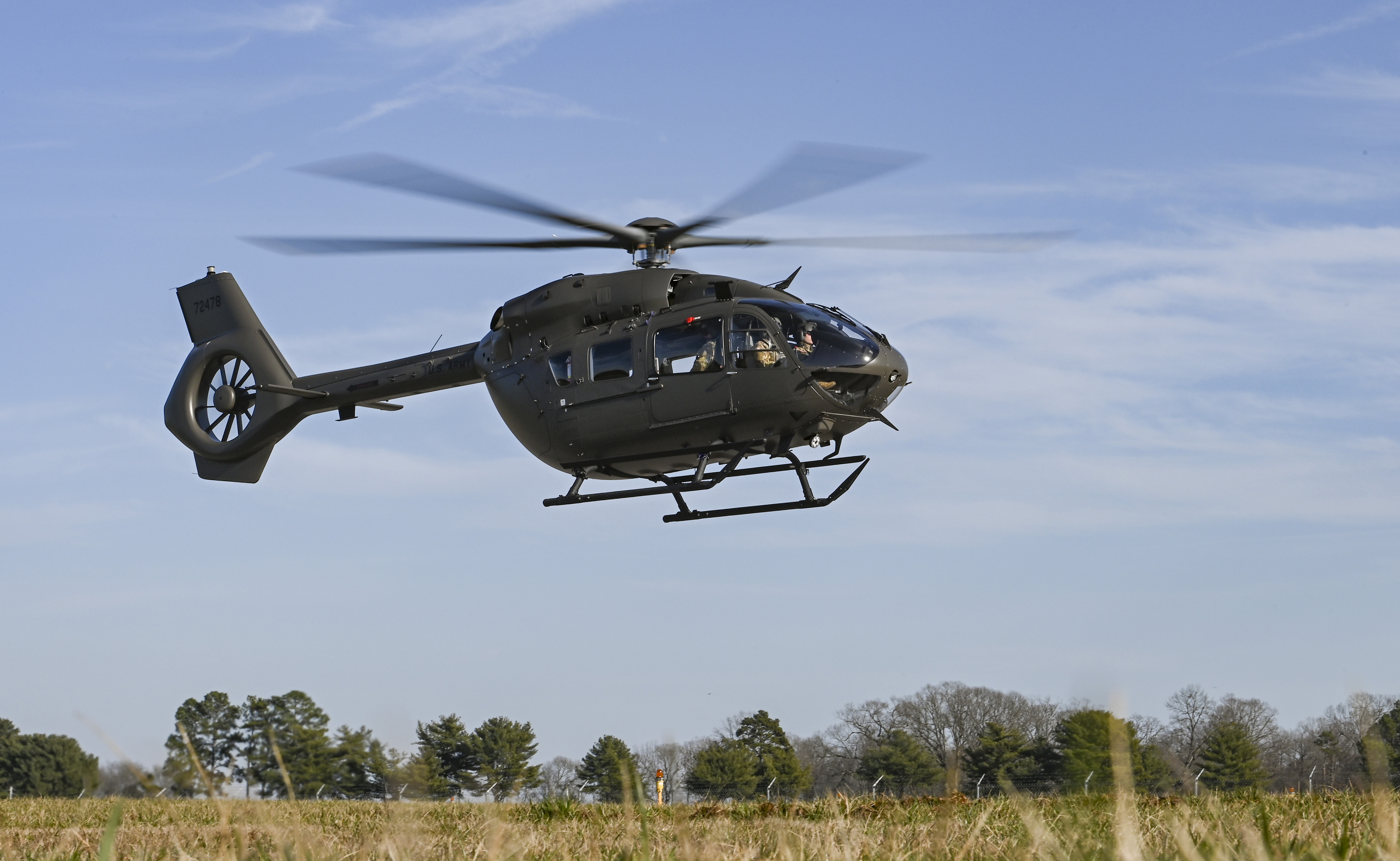
A UH-72B of the U.S. National Guard

UH-72A Lakota
An unarmed utility military version of the EC 145.
UH-72B Lakota
Upgrade of the UH-72A; this configuration is based on the civilian H145. The model has a Fenestron tail rotor, five-bladed main rotor, more powerful engines, enhanced controls, and the Airbus Helionix avionics suite. Deliveries to the ARNG began in September 2021.
UH-72B Unmanned Logistics Connector
A proposed unmanned variant of the UH-72B for the United States Marine Corps and United States Army. It would provide autonomous logistical support for Expeditionary Advanced Base Operations for the USMC and contested airspace for the Army. If the USMC selects it, it could be fielded by the late 2020s. As of June 2025, it has received the designation of MQ-72C.
AAS-72X
An armed scout and multi-role version of the UH-72A offered in the US Army's Armed Aerial Scout OH-58D replacement program, offered by EADS and Lockheed Martin until AAS was cancelled. The AAS-72X had two external hardpoints and turret mounted visions system among other features, and was C-17 transportable
AAS-72X+
An armed military version of the Eurocopter EC145T2 was also proposed for the Armed Aerial Scout program building on the features of the X model. The X+ was equipped with more powerful engines with an extra 200 shaft horsepower each, a fenestron shrouded tail rotor, and a fully digital glass cockpit.

== Operators ==
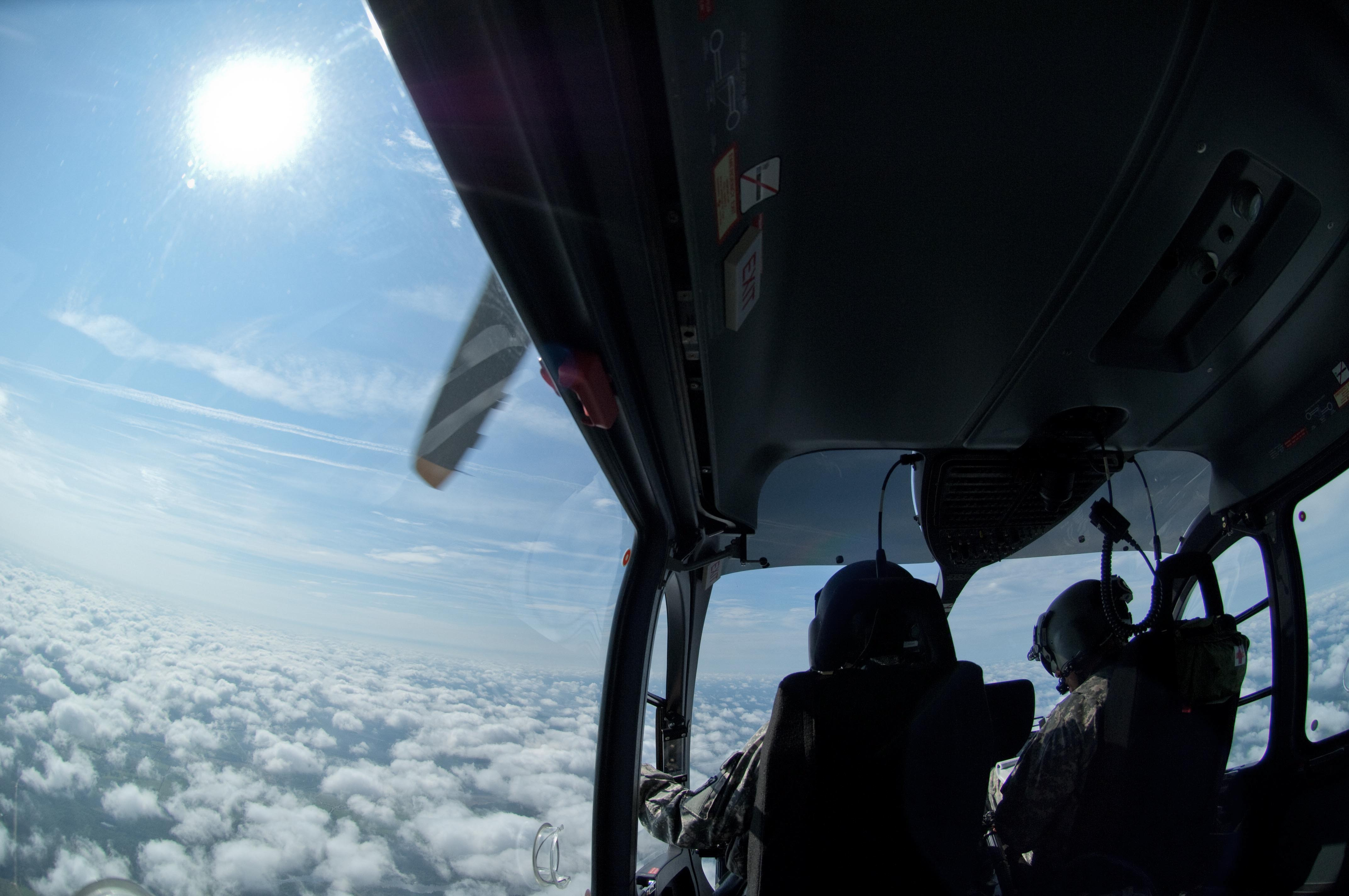
Cabin view, looking out a UH-72

Thailand

- Royal Thai Army

United States

- United States Army 457 UH-72A and 18 UH-72B Lakotas as of January 2025
  - United States Military Academy
- United States Navy
  - Test Pilot School

== Specifications (UH-72A) ==
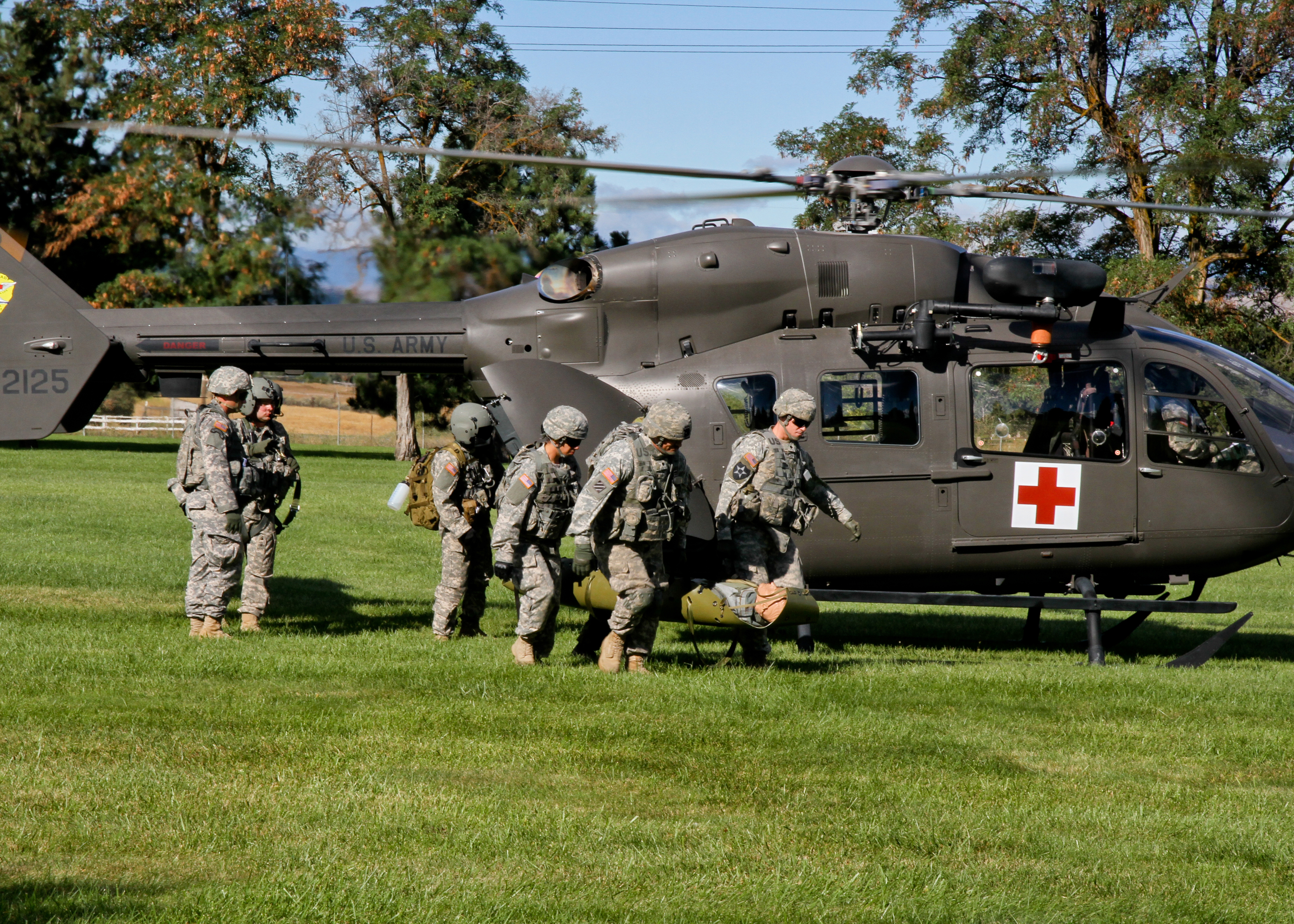
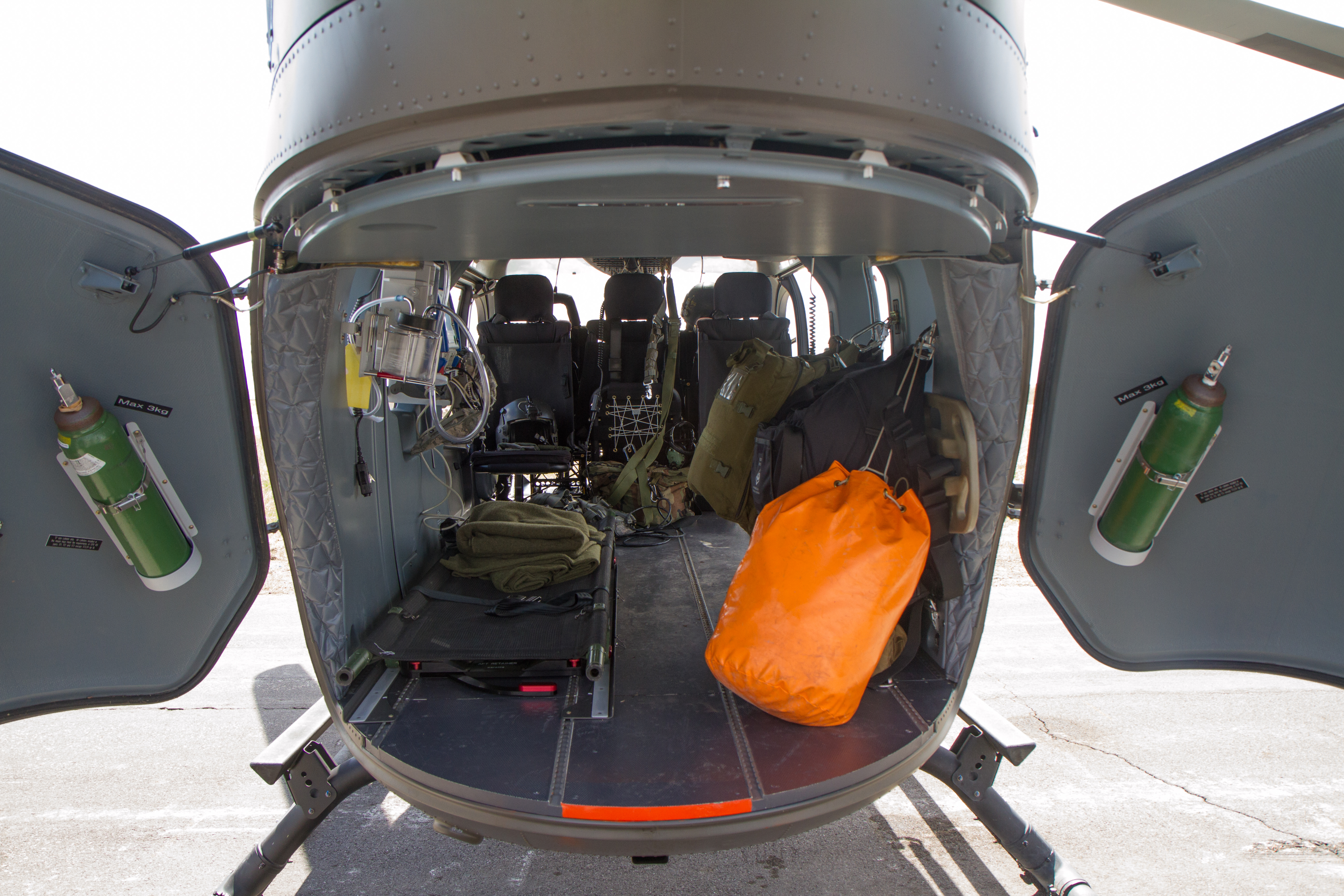
A UH-72A with a MEDEVAC package, showing rear clamshell doors

Data from UH-72 specifications, Eurocopter EC 145 data

General characteristics

- Crew: 1 or 2 pilots
- Capacity: 9 troops or 2 stretchers and medical crew / 3,953 lb (1,793 kg) payload
- Length: 42 ft 9 in (13.03 m)
- Height: 11 ft 4 in (3.45 m)
- Empty weight: 3,951 lb (1,792 kg)
- Max takeoff weight: 7,904 lb (3,585 kg)
- Powerplant: 2 × Turbomeca Arriel 1E2 turboshaft engine, 738 shp (550 kW) each
- Main rotor diameter: 36 ft 1 in (11 m)
- Main rotor area: 1,022.4 sq ft (94.98 m^{2})
- Blade section: ONERA OA415/OA312 at root; ONERA OA409/OA407 at tip

Performance

- Maximum speed: 167 mph (268 km/h, 145 kn)
- Cruise speed: 153 mph (246 km/h, 133 kn)
- Range: 426 mi (685 km, 370 nmi)
- Service ceiling: 13,182 ft (4,018 m)
- Rate of climb: 1,600 ft/min (8.13 m/s)

== See also ==
- U.S. helicopter armament subsystems

Related development

- Eurocopter EC145

Aircraft of comparable role, configuration, and era

- AgustaWestland AW169
- Bell UH-1 Iroquois
- Eurocopter MH-65 Dolphin
- HAL Dhruv

Related lists

- List of active United States military aircraft
- List of rotorcraft
