= Hot start =

In aviation, the term hot start has one meaning for turbine engines and one for reciprocating engines.

== Reciprocating engines ==
In an aircraft with a reciprocating engine, a hot start is a condition where an engine start is attempted after it has been run, achieved operating temperature, and then shut down. The engine has not had time to cool, and is therefore "hot". When a reciprocating engine is shut down, the residual engine heat dissipates into the air and the aircraft structure. Some heat is transferred to the engine fuel lines and fuel injector lines in the engine compartment. Because no fuel is flowing, the fuel may vaporize within the fuel lines, creating a condition called vapor lock. This combination of liquid and vaporized fuel disrupts fuel availability to the engine fuel pump and fuel injection system. If severe, the fuel pumps can "cavitate" (when the pumping chamber fills with vapor rather than liquid fuel) and becomes ineffective. The vapor in the fuel lines and loss of fuel pump effectiveness result in inconsistent fuel flow to the engine fuel injectors and ultimately the cylinders complicating starting. Vapor lock can also occur in flight resulting in a rough running engine or engine stoppage.

Unlike a turbine engine, a hot start is unlikely to damage a reciprocating engine. However, with improper starting procedures, the situation may deplete the starter battery before successfully starting the engine and risk battery or starter damage and excess wear due to repeated unsuccessful attempts to start the engine.

On the ground, vapor lock in the fuel lines is merely an inconvenience. However, in the air, it becomes an emergency situation due to the difficulty in restarting the engine. Operators of reciprocating engines must switch fuel tanks prior to fuel exhaustion and understand the hot start engine starting procedure. Most aircraft handbooks describe specific procedures for starting the engine(s) after a recent shutdown while the engine is still "hot" to avoid vapor lock and enable a successful restart. Not all pilot operating handbooks use the hot start terminology to describe this procedure. Additionally, most pilot operating handbooks for aircraft susceptible to vapor lock have a procedure for addressing vapor lock or "rough engine" if encountered in flight.

== Turbine engines ==
A hot start in a turbine engine is the result of improper starting technique rather than starting an engine that is hot due to recent shutdown.

In turbojet, turbofan, turboprop, and turboshaft engines, a great amount of the air runs around the combustion chamber or around its flame, instead of mixing with fuel. This air cools the combustion chambers and keeps chamber temperature within its limits. Without this cooling effect, the chamber would overheat and may melt.

When a gas turbine is started, the high-pressure shaft must attain enough speed to allow the compressor to circulate a sufficient amount of air through the engine before the fuel is injected. Once this happens, then the engine will be able to run by itself.

The critical part is injecting the fuel. If the fuel is ignited without sufficient air flowing around the chamber, its temperature can increase past the design limits of the combustion chamber and turbine blades, thus causing a failure. This condition is known as a hot start.

In some jet engines, the full authority digital engine control (FADEC) system prevents such a condition from occurring. In engines without FADEC, the flight crew has to monitor the engine parameters and manually shut off the fuel valve if the exhaust temperature exceeds its maximum allowed value.
