= Grand Prairie Municipal Airport =

Coordinates: 32°41′56″N 097°02′49″W

- IATA: none; ICAO: KGPM; FAA LID: GPM

Summary
- Airport type: Public
- Owner: City of Grand Prairie
- Operator: Mark Divita
- Serves: Grand Prairie, Texas
- Location: 3116 S Great Southwest Parkway Grand Prairie, TX 75052
- Elevation AMSL: 588 ft (179 m)
- Website: GrandPrairieAirport

Map
- Location within Texas Location within the United States

Runways
Direction	Length		Surface
Direction	ft	m	Surface
18/36	4,001	1,220	Concrete

Helipads
Number	Length		Surface
Number	ft	m	Surface
H1	50	15	Concrete

Statistics (2022)
- Aircraft operations: 101,991
- Based aircraft: 286
- Sources: airport web site and FAA

Grand Prairie Municipal Airport (ICAO: KGPM, FAA LID: GPM) is five miles southwest of Grand Prairie, a city largely in Dallas County, Texas.

Most U.S. airports use the same three-letter location identifier for the FAA and IATA, but Grand Prairie Municipal Airport is GPM to the FAA and has no IATA code.

== Facilities ==
The airport covers 162 acres (66 ha); its single runway, 17/35, is 4,001 x 75 ft (1,220 x 23 m) long. There is also one helipad, H1, 50ftX50ft (15mx15m). In the year ending December 31, 2022, the airport had 101,991 aircraft operations, average 279 per day: 99% general aviation, 1% military, and <1% air taxi. 286 aircraft were based at the airport: 272 single-engine, 12 multi-engine, 1 jet, and 1 helicopter. Airbus Helicopters Inc has its headquarters on the west side of the airport.

== See also ==
- List of airports in Texas
