= Bermuda Garrison =

British military post

- Bermuda
- Presentation of Colours at Prospect Camp

Site information
- Type: Barracks
- Owner: Ministry of Defence
- Operator: British Army

Location
- Location in Bermuda
- Coordinates: 32.2994949°N 64.7653454°W

Site history
- Built: 1793
- Built for: War Office; Board of Ordnance
- In use: 1793–1957

The Bermuda Garrison was the military establishment maintained on the British Overseas Territory and Imperial fortress of Bermuda by the regular British Army and its local-service militia and voluntary reserves from 1701 to 1957. The garrison evolved from an independent company, to a company of Royal Garrison Battalion during the American War of Independence, and a steadily growing and diversifying force of artillery and infantry with various supporting corps from the French Revolution onwards. During the American War of Independence, the garrison in Bermuda fell under the military Commander-in-Chief of America. Subsequently, it was part of the Nova Scotia Command until 1868, and was an independent Bermuda Command from then until its closure in 1957.

From the 1790s onwards, the garrison existed firstly to defend Bermuda as the main base of the North America and West Indies Station, including the defence of the Royal Naval Dockyard (HM Dockyard Bermuda) and other facilities in the Imperial fortress colony that were important to Imperial security until the HM Dockyard was reduced to a base (a process that was carried out between 1951 and 1957). The movable military forces in Bermuda (the Board of Ordnance Military Corps, including the Royal Artillery, Royal Engineers, and Royal Sappers and Miners, and transport and ordnance and commissariat stores departments, and the infantry of the regular British Army, as opposed to the local-service forces of militia and volunteers) included significant stores capability, and was generally an overlarge garrison by comparison to other colonies (most of which received no regular garrison), with the intent that, relying on the Royal Naval squadron for transport, supply, coastal bombardment, and reinforcements in the form of landing parties of Royal Marines and sailors, Bermuda should be the launching point for military raids on the American coast by expeditionary forces detached from the defensive garrison, or that were stationed in Bermuda for that purpose, as demonstrated during the American War of 1812.

Although the last professional soldiers (a detachment of the Duke of Cornwall's Light Infantry) were withdrawn in 1957, and the Garrison ceased to exist, two part-time components – the Bermuda Militia Artillery and the Bermuda Volunteer Rifle Corps (retitled Bermuda Rifles) – continued to exist until 1965, when they amalgamated to create the current Royal Bermuda Regiment.

== 1609 to 1701 ==
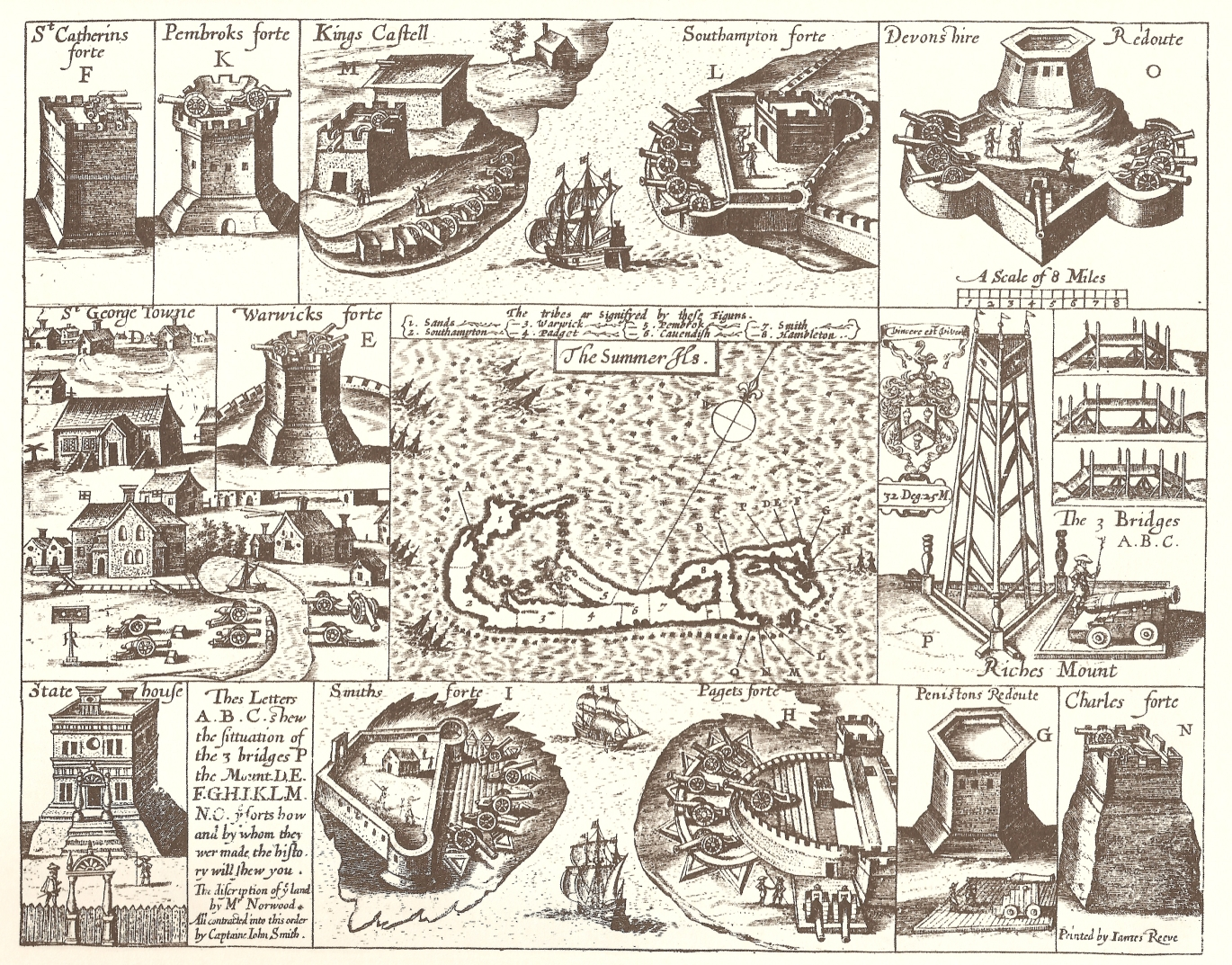
Captain John Smith's 1624 map of Bermuda, showing contemporary fortifications.

The English colony of Bermuda was settled accidentally in 1609 by the Virginia Company, when its flagship, the Sea Venture was wrecked off the archipelago. Although most of the settlers eventually completed their journey to Jamestown, Virginia, the company remained in possession of Bermuda, with Virginia's borders officially extended far enough out to sea to include Bermuda in 1612. In the same year, a Governor and more settlers arrived to join the three men left behind from the Sea Venture. From then until 1701, Bermuda's defence was left entirely in the hands of her own militias.

Bermuda tended toward the Royalist side during the English Civil War, being the first of six colonies to recognise Charles II as King on the execution of his father, Charles I, in 1649, and was one of those targeted by the Rump Parliament in An Act for prohibiting Trade with the Barbadoes, Virginia, Bermuda and Antego, which was passed on 30 October 1650. With control of the "army" (the militia), the colony's Royalists deposed the Governor, Captain Thomas Turner, elected John Trimingham to replace him, and exiled many of its Parliamentary-leaning Independents to settle the Bahamas under William Sayle as the Eleutheran Adventurers. Bermuda's defences (coastal artillery batteries and forts, as well as its militia) were too powerful for the task force sent in 1651 by Parliament under the command of Admiral Sir George Ayscue to capture the Royalist colonies.

In May, 1650, the Reverend Mr. Hooper informed the Council of Bermuda that a ship under the command of Captain Powell, with Commissioners Colonel Rich, Mr. Hollond, Captain Norwood, Captain Bond, and a hundred men aboard, was prepared to seize Bermuda. Although the local Government accepted instructions that arrived at the same time from the Virginia Company regarding the appointment of Governor, it remained staunchly Royalist, prosecuting traitors against the our Soveraigne Lord the Kinge. in November of that year. No assault was attempted against Bermuda, but after the 13 January 1652 fall of Barbados, the Government of Bermuda made peace with the Commonwealth, acknowledging the legitimacy and authority of the Commonwealth of England as yt is now established without a kinge or House of Lordes, but largely preserving the internal status quo of the colony.

Alongside Bermuda's militia (as in England, a conscripted infantry force) was a standing body of volunteers (and some convicts, sentenced to carrying out military service) trained as artillery men to garrison the forts and batteries built by the local government. The earliest of these forts built were the first stone fortifications (and buildings) in the English New World, the first coastal artillery, and are today the oldest English New World fortifications still standing. Together with St. George's town, the forts near the town (including the Castle Islands Fortifications) are today a UNESCO World Heritage Site.

In addition to the full-time artillerymen, all of the colony's men of military age were obliged to turn out for militia training and in case of war. They were organised as infantry and (after the Civil War, which had demonstrated the importance at that time of cavalry and mounted infantry) a Troop of Horse.

== 1701 to 1768 ==
In 1701, the threat of war led the English government to post an Independent Company of regular soldiers to Bermuda, where the militia continued to function as a standby in case of war or insurrection. The company, a detachment of the 2nd Foot of the English Army, arrived in Bermuda along with the new Governor, Captain Benjamin Bennett, aboard HMS Lincoln, in May 1701, and was composed of Captain Lancelot Sandys, Lieutenant Robert Henly, two sergeants, two corporals, fifty private soldiers, and a drummer. General William Selwyn had objected to their detachment. Despite this small regular detachment, the militia remained Bermuda's primary defence force. Following the conclusion of the Seven Years' War in 1763, the Independent Company was removed. A company of the 9th Foot was detached from Florida, reinforced with a detachment from the Bahamas Independent Company, but this force was withdrawn in 1768, leaving only the militia.

== 1793 to 1815 ==
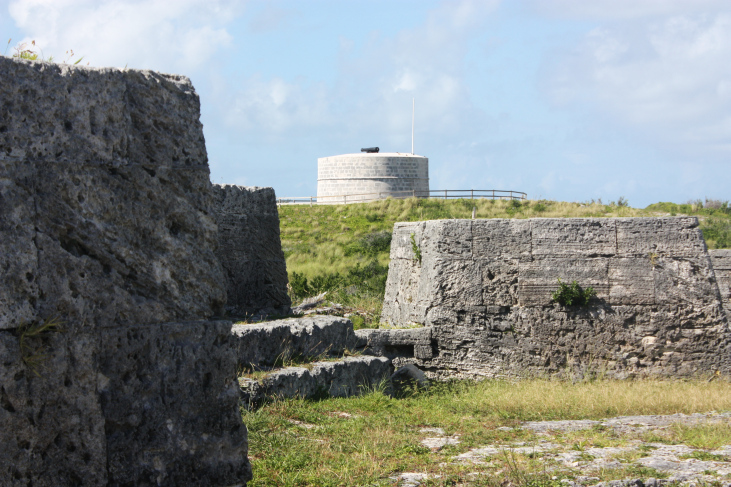
The effect of thirty years of evolution on the design of coastal fortifications, between the 1790s and 1822, can be discerned between Ferry Island Fort (in the foreground), with multiple guns arrayed to cover the water westward, and the Martello tower in the background, which used a single gun with 360° traverse to cover all of the surrounding area. Ferry Reach, Bermuda, 2011.

Regular soldiers invalided from continental battlefields as part of the Royal Garrison Battalion had been stationed in Bermuda between 1778 and 1784 during the American War of Independence, but were withdrawn following the Treaty of Paris. US independence cost the Royal Navy all of her continental bases between the Canadian Maritimes and the West Indies. As a result, following the American War of Independence the Admiralty began purchasing land around Bermuda, especially at the under-developed West End, with a view to establishing a dockyard and naval base there.

The Royal Naval establishment began with facilities in St. George's Town in 1795, after the naval surveyors had spent a dozen years charting the barrier reef that encircles Bermuda in order to discover the channel that enabled access for ships of the line to the northern lagoon, as well as to the Great Sound, Hamilton Harbour, and the West End of Bermuda. Although this channel had been located, the naval base had first been established at St. George's Town, at the East End, because the West End lands that the Admiralty was acquiring for a permanent base were as yet completely undeveloped. Vice Admiral Sir George Murray, Commander-in-Chief of the new River St. Lawrence and Coast of America and North America and West Indies Station, set up the first Admiralty House, Bermuda at Rose Hill, St. George's, with the anchorage for the fleet being what is still known as Murray's Anchorage, in the Northern Lagoon off St. George's Island. In 1813, the naval area of command including Bermuda became the North America Station again, with the West Indies falling under the Jamaica Station, and in 1816 it was renamed the North America and Lakes of Canada Station. When the United States declared war on Britain in 1812, construction of the Royal Naval Dockyard) has scarcely commenced, and the main naval base was still at St. George's alongside the main military facility, the St. George's Garrison

The British Army had re-established its garrison on Bermuda the year before the Royal Navy established its base. As the French Revolution had led to war between Britain and France, three companies of the 47th Regiment of Foot were detached to Bermuda in 1793. Prior to this point, the military garrison had always accommodated soldiers in St. George's Town and outlying forts, but construction of the Royal Barracks on the hill to the east of the town, thenceforth called Barrack Hill, marked the establishment of the first large army camp in Bermuda, St. George's Garrison. Regular soldiers would continue to be stationed in Bermuda from then 'til 1957, with the garrison expanded greatly during the 19th Century, when Bermuda was designated an Imperial Fortress, both to defend the colony as a naval base (while keeping it from becoming an enemy naval base) and to potentially launch and support amphibious operations against the Atlantic coast of the United States in any war that should transpire with the former colonies.

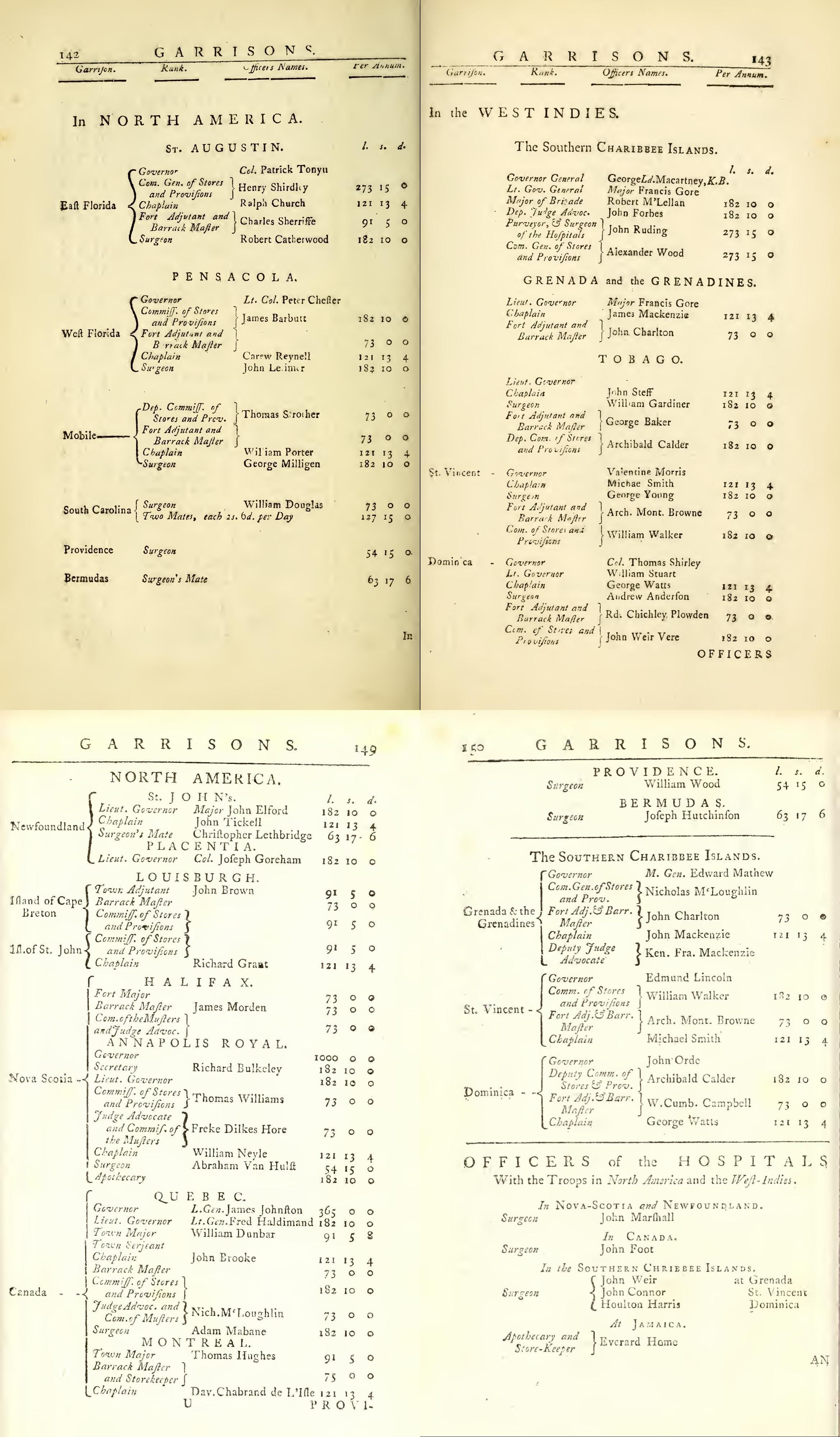
Military Governors and Staff Officers in garrisons of British North America and the West Indies 1778 and 1784

Prior to 1784, the Bermuda Garrison had been placed under the military Commander-in-Chief America in New York during the American War of Independence, but was subsequently to become part of the Nova Scotia Command until the 1860s (in 1815, Lieutenant-General Sir George Prevost was Captain-General and Governor-in-Chief in and over the Provinces of Upper-Canada, Lower-Canada, Nova-Scotia, and New~Brunswick, and their several Dependencies, Vice-Admiral of the same, Lieutenant-General and Commander of all His Majesty’s Forces in the said Provinces of Lower Canada and Upper-Canada, Nova-Scotia and New-Brunswick, and their several Dependencies, and in the islands of Newfoundland, Prince Edward, Cape Breton and the Bermudas, &c. &c. &c. Beneath Prevost, the staff of the British Army in the Provinces of Nova-Scotia, New-Brunswick, and their Dependencies, including the Islands of Newfoundland, Cape Breton, Prince Edward and Bermuda were under the Command of Lieutenant-General Sir John Coape Sherbrooke. Below Sherbrooke, the Bermuda Garrison was under the immediate control of the Governor of Bermuda, Major-General George Horsford).

The wars with France that had begun with the Revolution would drag on from 1793 to 1815. Meanwhile, the Royal Navy, British Army, Royal Marines, and Colonial Marines forces based in Bermuda did in fact carry out amphibious operations against the Atlantic coast of the United States during the 1812 to 1815 American War of 1812. In 1813, Lieutenant-Colonel, Sir Thomas Sydney Beckwith arrived in Bermuda to command a military force tasked with working with the Royal Navy in raiding the Atlantic Seaboard of the United States (where the Royal Navy was also blockading American ports), specifically in the region of Chesapeake Bay. The force, which was split into two brigades, was composed of the infantry regiment then on garrison duty in Bermuda, the 102nd Regiment of Foot, Royal Marines from the naval squadron, and a unit recruited from French prisoners-of-war. It took part in the Battle of Craney Island on 22 June 1813. A much larger naval and military force, 2,500 soldiers under Major-General Robert Ross aboard HMS Royal Oak, three frigates, three sloops and ten other vessels, was sent to Bermuda in 1814, following British victory in the Peninsular War.

In August, 1814, this naval and military force sailed from Bermuda to join forces already operating on the American coast in order to carry out the Chesapeake Campaign, resulting in the Raid on Alexandria, the Battle of Bladensburg, the Burning of Washington, and an attempted assault on Baltimore, Maryland, in the Battle of Baltimore. This campaign had been called for by Lieutenant-General Sir George Prevost (the Captain-General and Governor-in-Chief in and over the Provinces of Upper-Canada, Lower-Canada, Nova Scotia, and New-Brunswick, and their several Dependencies, Vice-Admiral of the same, Lieutenant-General and Commander of all His Majesty’s Forces in the said Provinces of Lower-Canada and Upper-Canada, Nova Scotia and New-Brunswick, and their several Dependencies, and in the islands of Newfoundland, Prince Edward, Cape Breton and the Bermudas, &c. &c. &c) in retribution for the "wanton destruction of private property along the north shores of Lake Erie" by American forces under Col. John Campbell in May 1814, the most notable being the Raid on Port Dover) to draw United States forces away from the Canadian border.

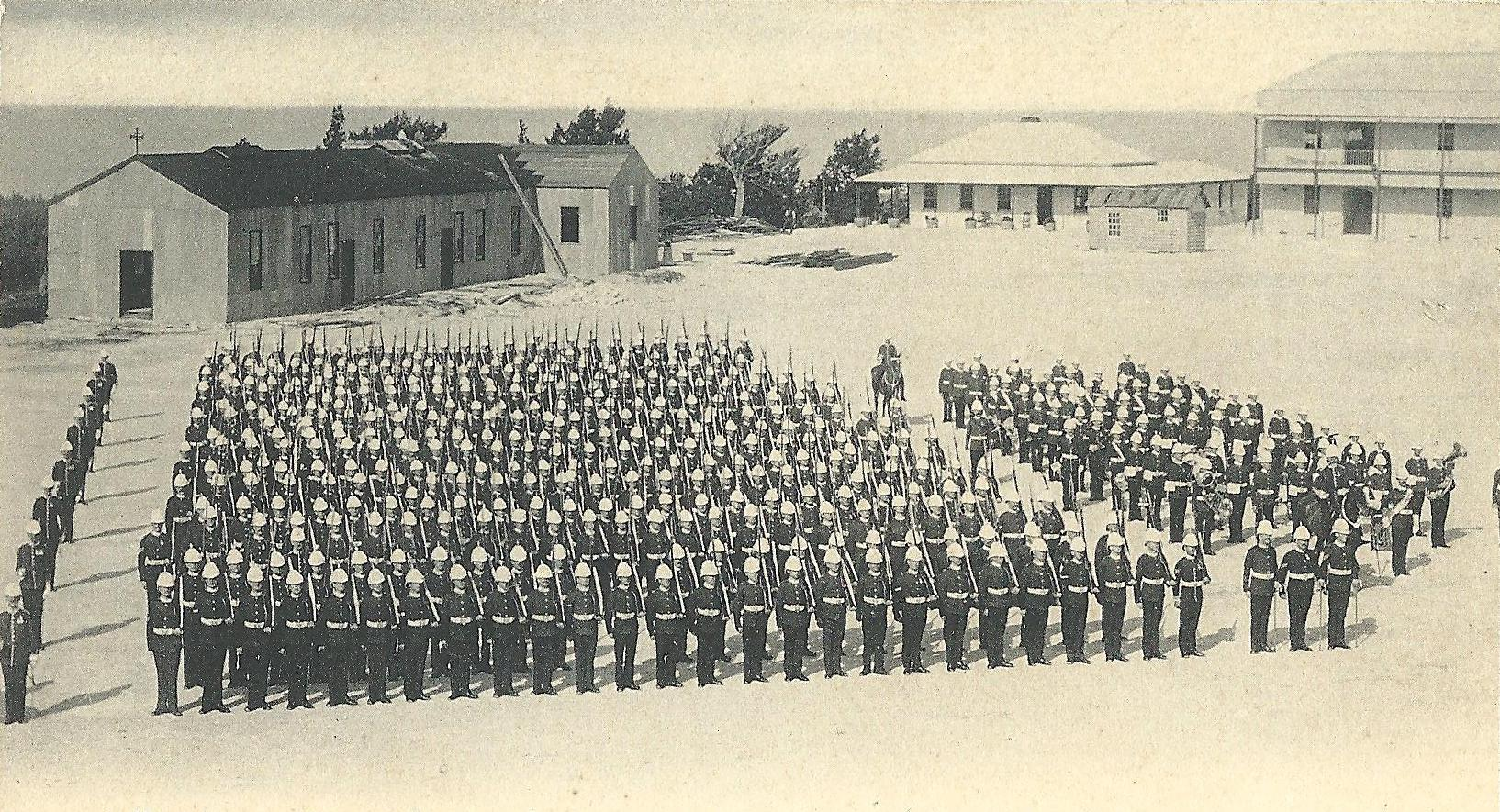
A Battalion of infantry on parade at Prospect Camp

With the re-establishment of a regular army garrison, Bermudians had lost interest in maintaining militias and the Militia Acts were allowed to lapse. There was a brief resurgence of volunteer forces and the militia during the American War of 1812, but these were allowed to lapse again thereafter. The Bermuda Government would not re-raise local reserve forces until pressed by the Secretary of State for War to create the Bermuda Militia Artillery and the Bermuda Volunteer Rifle Corps eight decades later (although there were a number of short-lived attempts to maintain militia without the contribution of the Parliament of Bermuda).

== 19th century ==
Warwick Camp in 1868, with tents set up on the 800 yard rifle range.

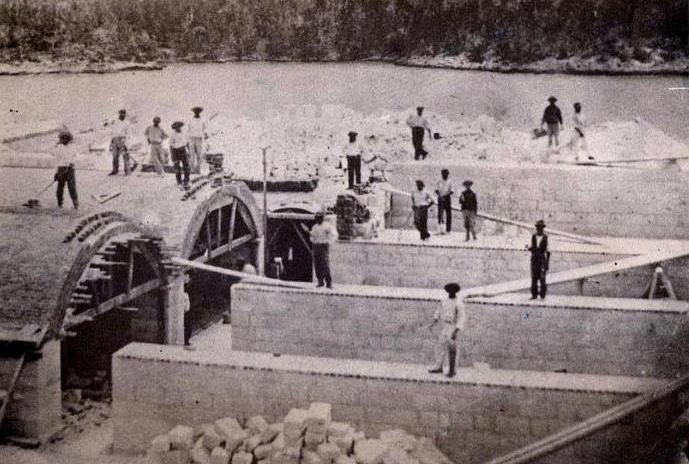
Construction of the magazine on Agar's Island in 1870

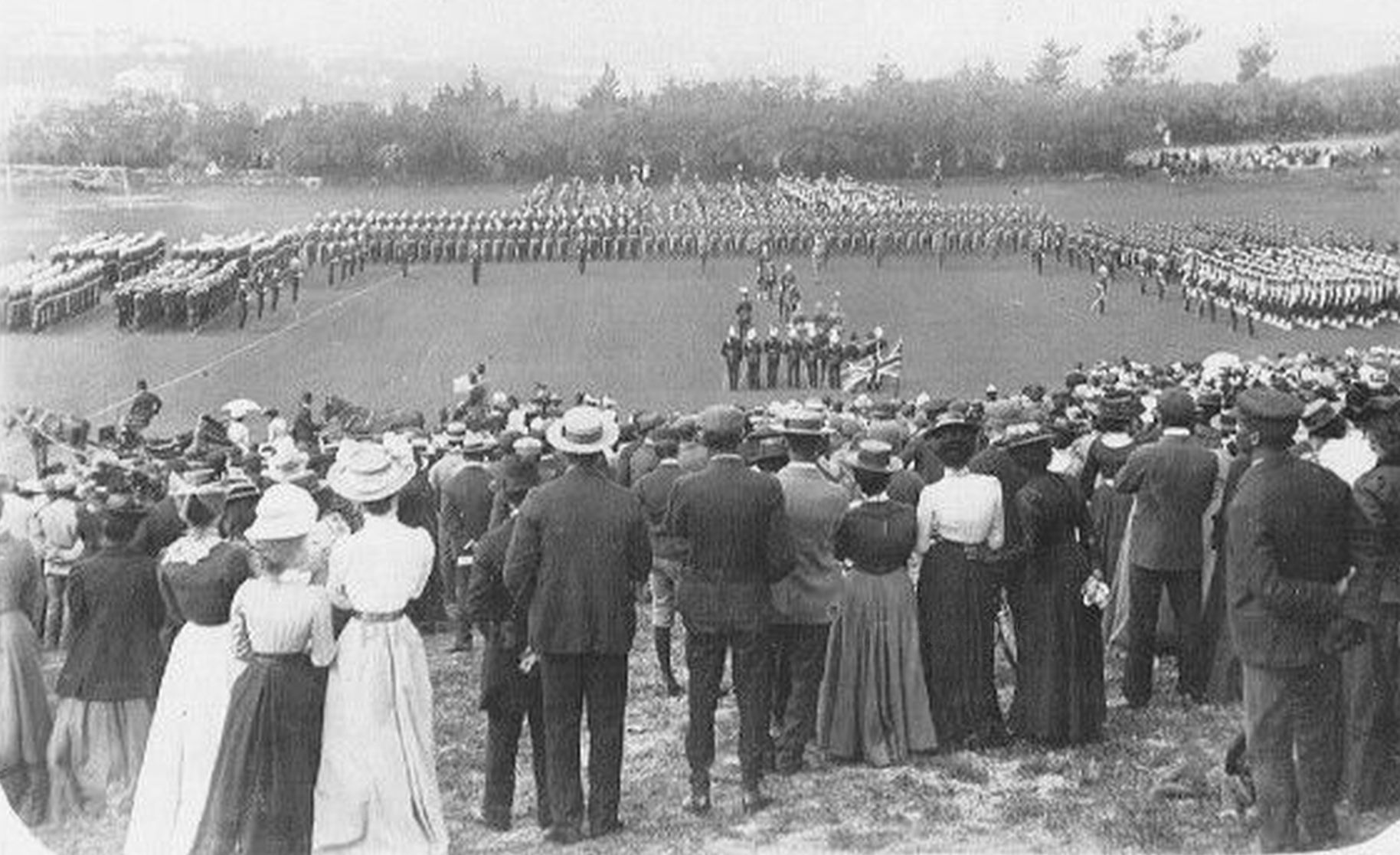
Parade at Prospect Camp Bermuda 1901

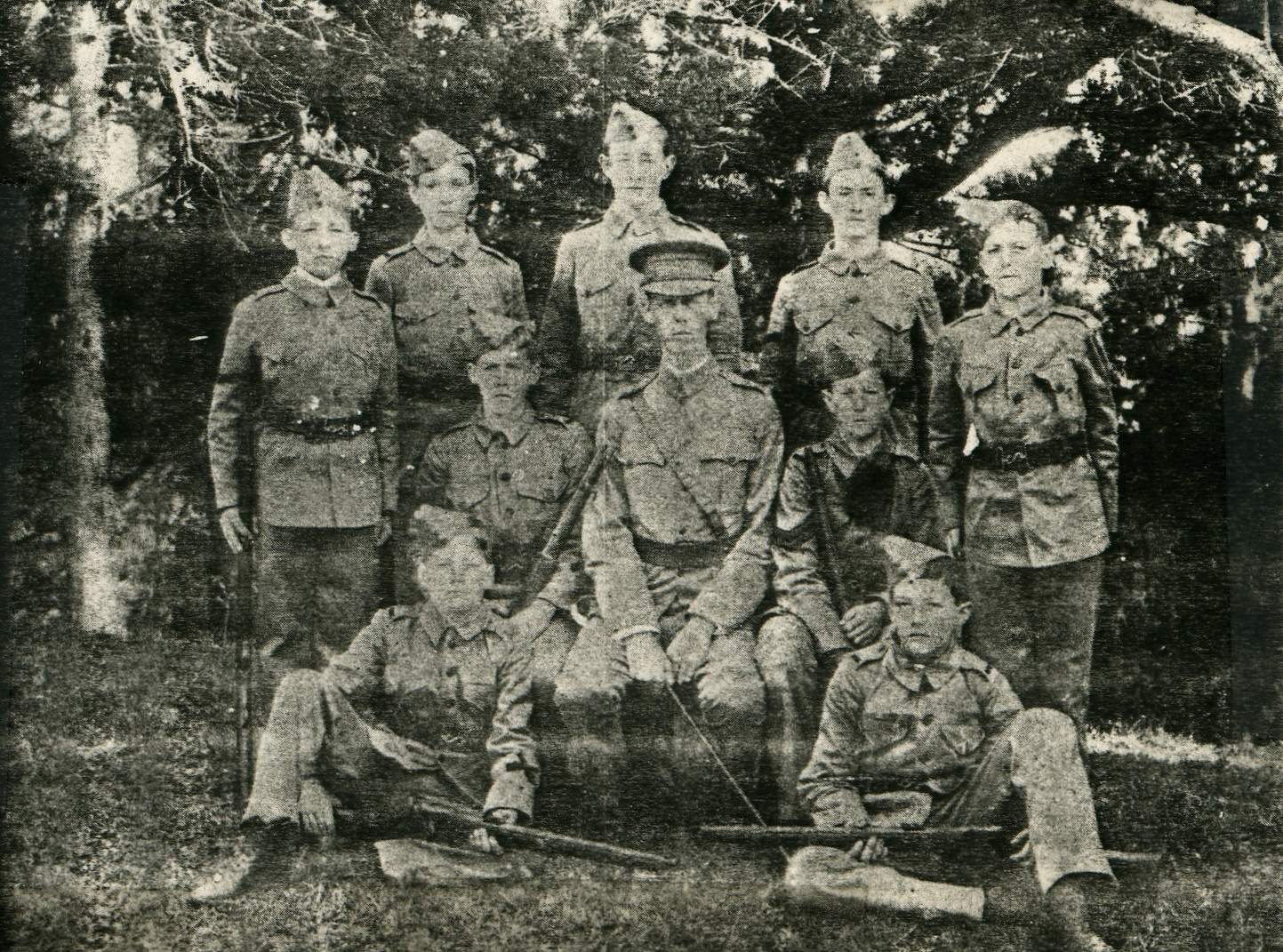
Saltus Grammar School Cadet Corps, 1901 (which became the Bermuda Cadet Corps)

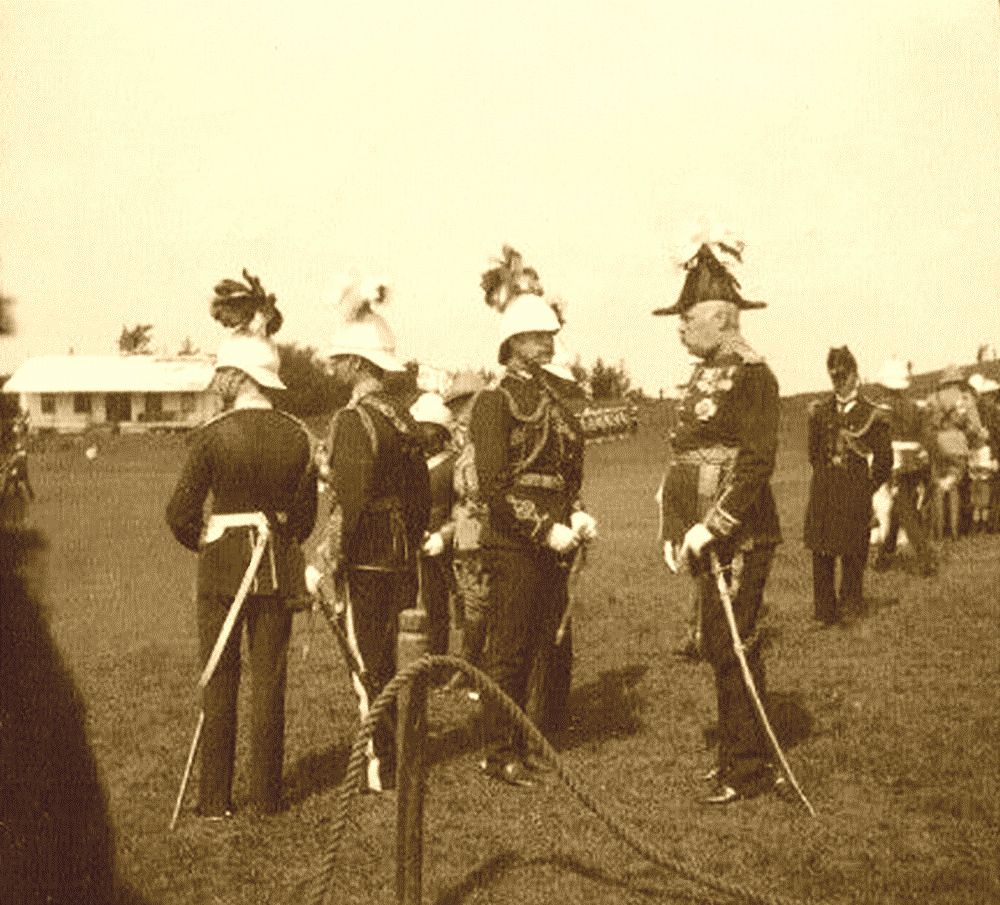
The Governor, Lt. Gen. Sir Henry LeGuay Geary, KCB, at Prospect Camp 1902 to present DSOs

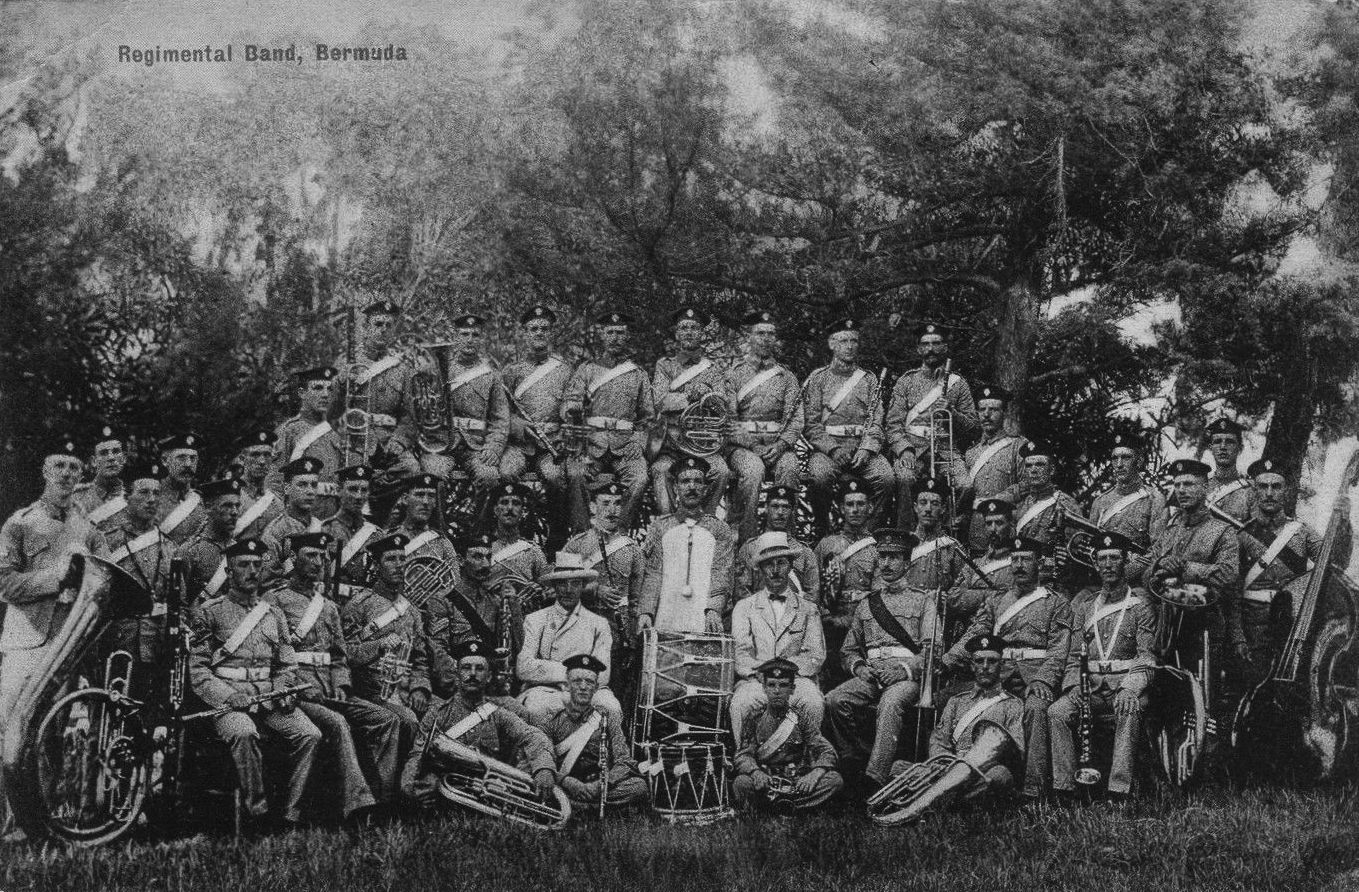
Band of the 3rd Battalion of The Royal Fusiliers in Bermuda circa 1903

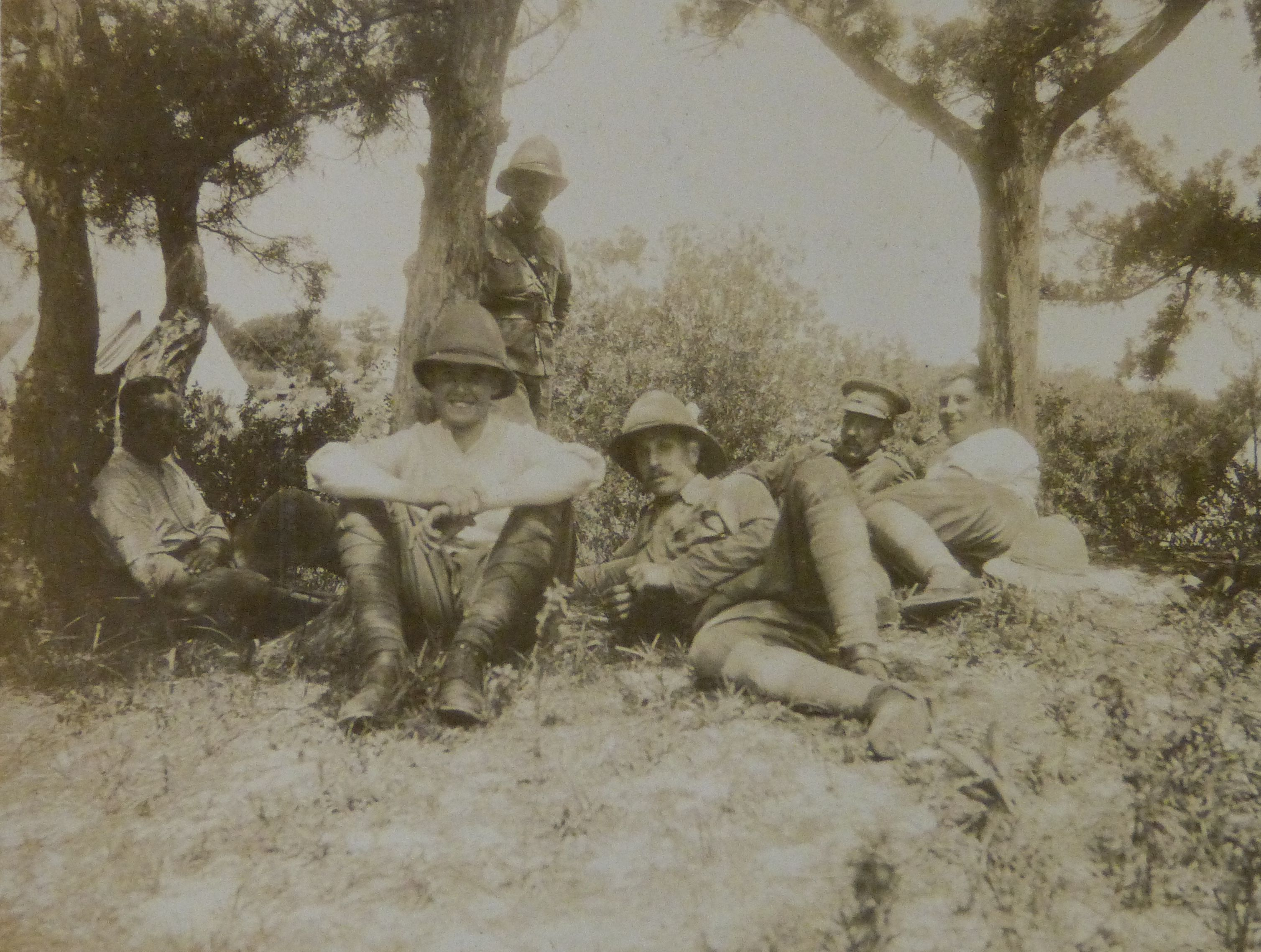
Officers of the 3rd Battalion Royal Fusiliers during Battalion Training at Tucker's Town in 1904

Lieutenant-General Sir F.W. Kitchener with The Duke of Cornwall's Light Infantry at Prospect Camp in 1909

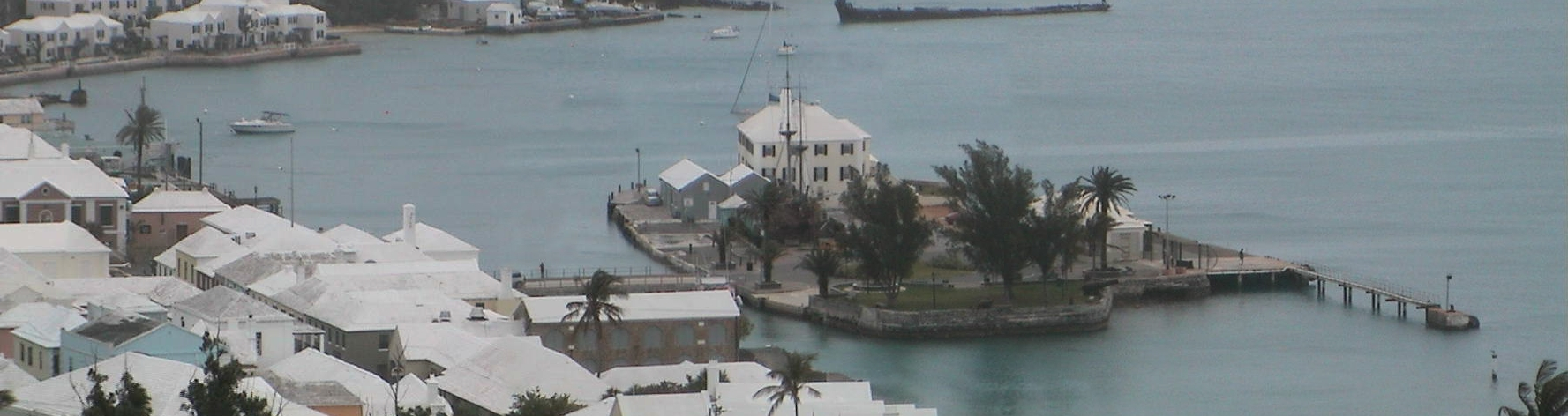
Ordnance Island, the former RAOC depot in St. George's.

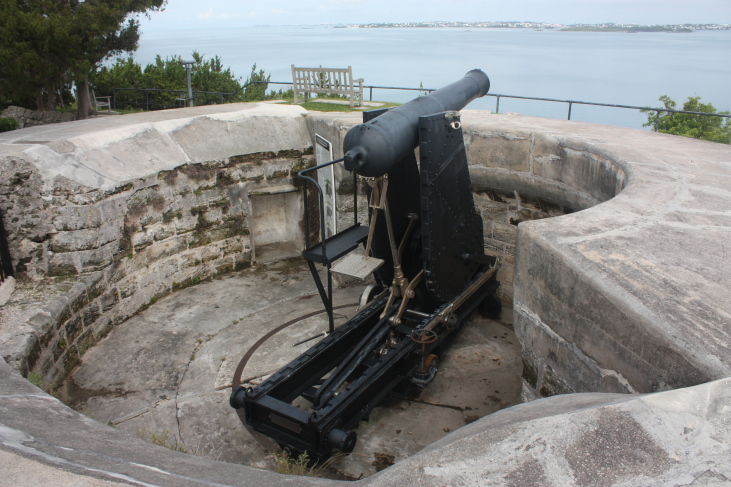
64 Pounder Rifled Muzzle-Loader (RML) gun on Moncrieff disappearing mount, at Scaur Hill Fort, Bermuda

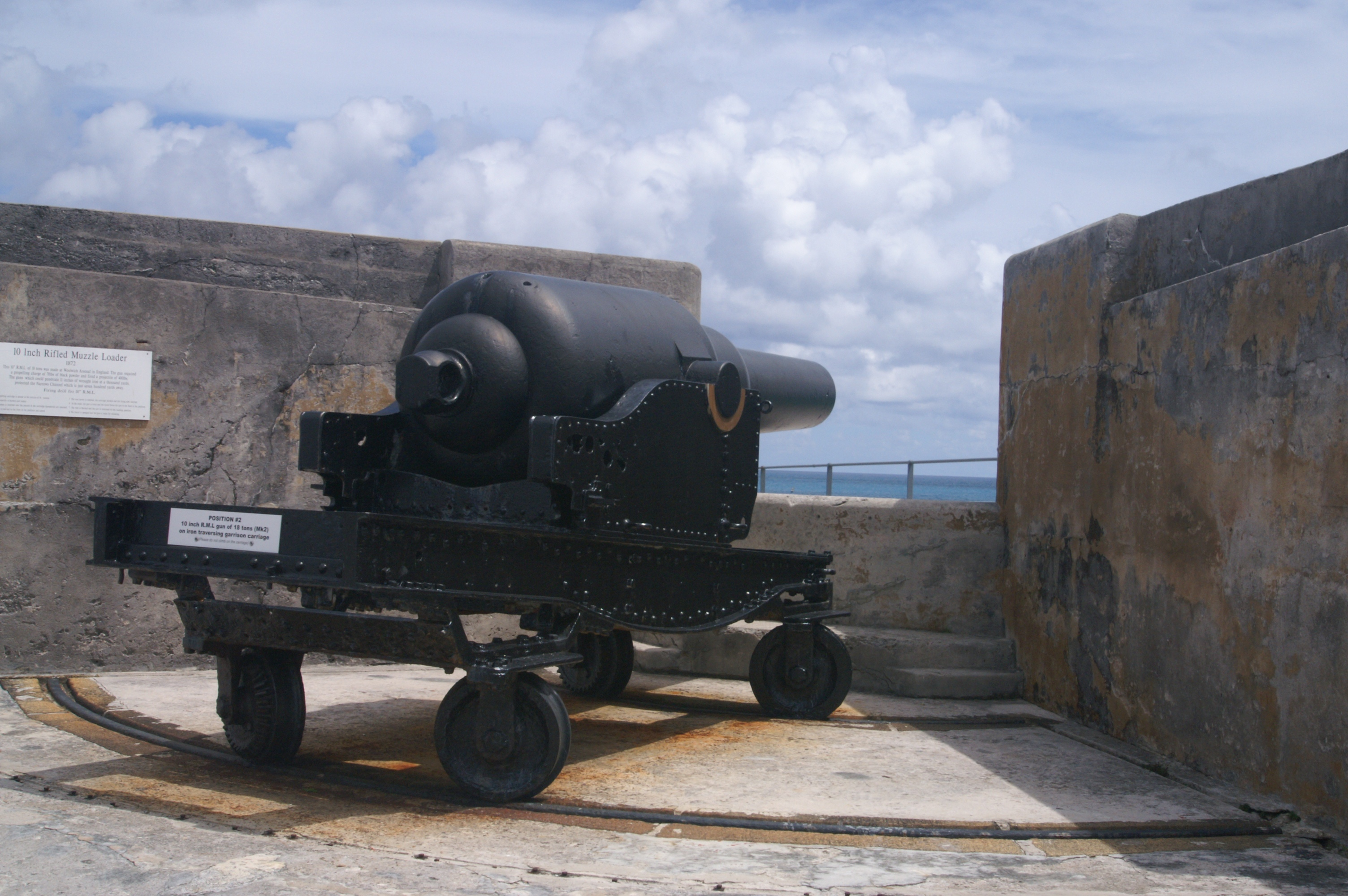
An RML 10 inch 18 ton gun at Fort St. Catherine's.

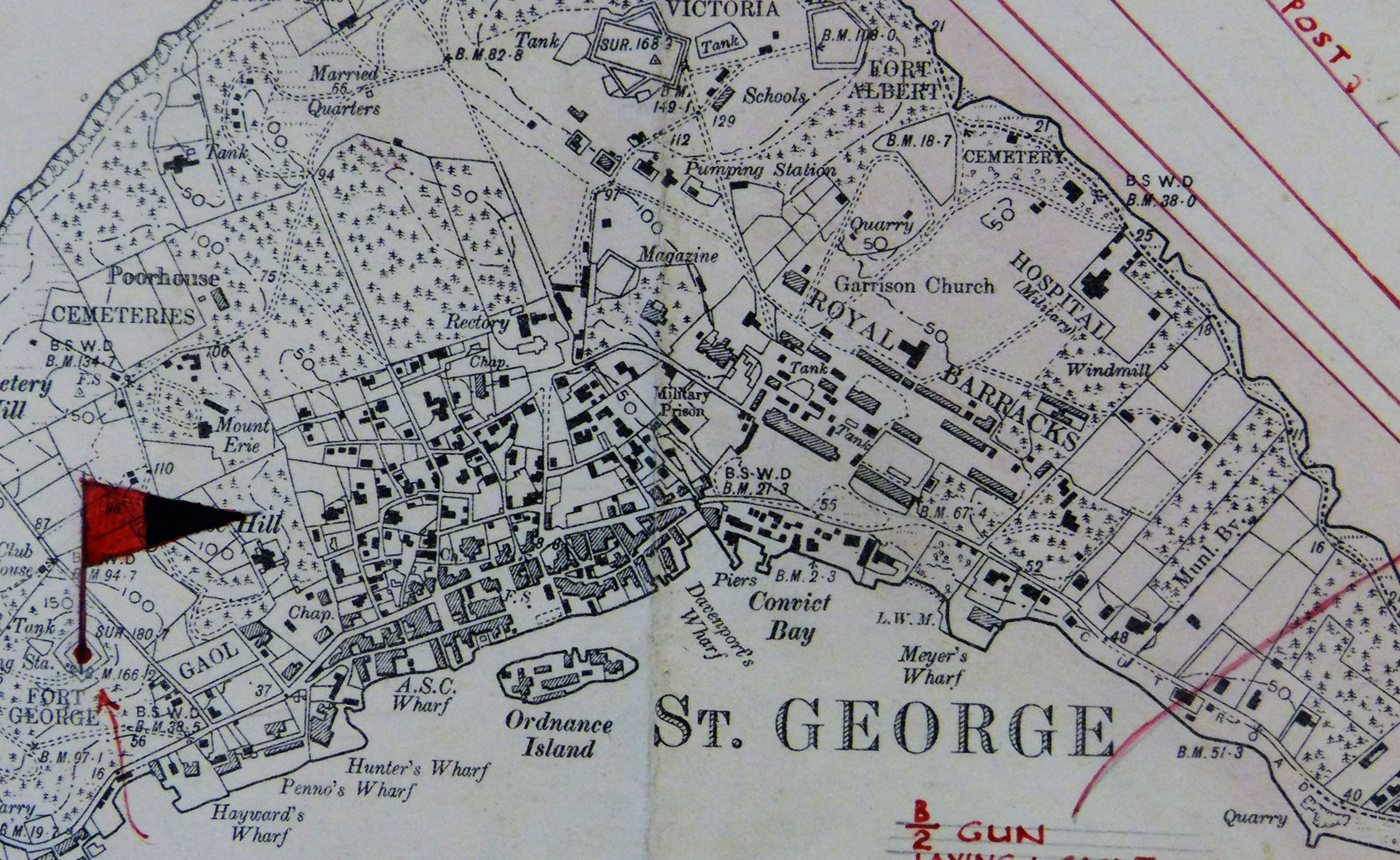
Map of St. George's Town and St. George's Garrison, as surveyed by Lieutenant Arthur Johnson Savage, RE, in 1897-1899

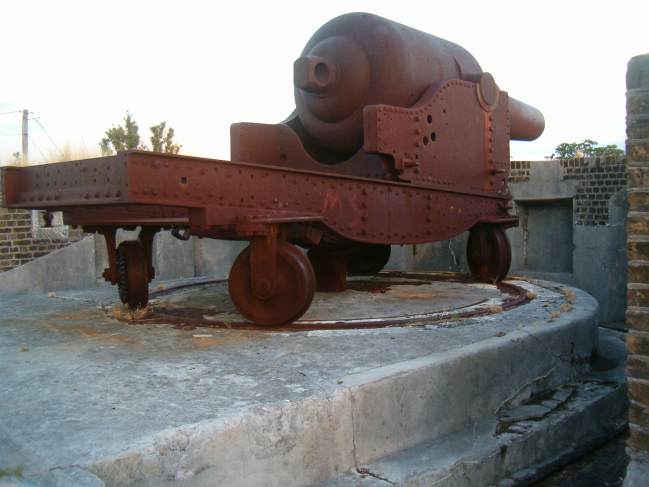
RML 11 inch 25 ton gun at Fort George in St. George's, Bermuda.

The increase in British naval and military forces in North America following the defeat of Napoleonic France was to be short-lived. After the conclusion of the Napoleonic Wars and the American War of 1812, economic austerity meant that the British armed forces were drastically reduced, and many of the improvements in organisation and practice gained during the preceding two decades of war were lost. Aside from the reduction in size of the British Army and the military corps of the Board of Ordnance, the Volunteer Force and Fencibles were disbanded, and the Militia in the British Isles became a paper tiger until re-organised in the 1850s. The invalid company of Royal Artillery in Bermuda, which had been depleted due to lack of replacements for personnel who had died or were pensioned or otherwise discharged, was withdrawn and not replaced, and the Militia was allowed by the colonial government to lapse after 1816. Bermuda's importance to Imperial defence was only increasing, however, and the parlous state of its own defence was commented upon by Sir Henry Hardinge in the House of Commons on 22 March 1839:

Such were some of the reasons why it appeared to him, that her Majesty's forces should be increased. He might go to other stations Bermuda for instance. All who were conversant with the interests of our West-Indian and North American possessions must know that Bermuda was one of our most important posts—a station where the navy could be refitted with the greatest ease, where during the last war we had about 2,000,000l. value in stores, where our ships (such was the safety of the anchorage) could at all times take refuge. This island had been fortified at very great expense; for some years 5,000 convicts had been engaged on the works, and it was most important in every point of view that this island should be maintained in a state of perfect security. For a long time even after the determination of the sympathisers in the United States to attack us had been known, the force at Bermuda was never greater than a small battalion of 480 or 500 men, perfectly inadequate to do the duties of the station. Considering that this post was one of great consequence, that immense sums had been expended upon it, and that the efficiency of the navy in those seas was chiefly to be secured by means of it, it was indispensable, that it should be in safe keeping. To what quarter were they to look for further reinforcements, should they be needed, to increase our army in America, in the event of the dispute between New Brunswick and Maine becoming more serious? Not to the West Indies, from which two battalions had already been withdrawn. Not to the Canadas, for communication between these provinces and New Brunswick was impracticable, separated as they were by a wilderness of 400 or 500 miles. In the other colonies every man was required. From the Ionian islands not one could be spared, from Malta not one. From Gibraltar, perhaps, one battalion more could be squeezed, if they could bring themselves to inflict great additional hardship on the troops now in garrison there, It really appeared to him absolutely necessary, that Government should look to the state of the army—should fairly consider the amount of work done by it, and apply themselves to the question, whether it was their duty to increase the military force.

From 1783 through 1801, the British Empire, including British North America, and the military was administered by the Home Office and by the Home Secretary. Control of the military passed to the War Office and the Secretary of State for War in 1794, and colonial business also from 1801 to 1854, with the War Office renamed the War and Colonial Office and the Secretary of State for War became the Secretary of State for War and Colonies.

From 1824, the British Empire (excepting India, which was administered by the East India Company, then the India Office) was divided by the War and Colonial Office into four administrative departments, including NORTH AMERICA, the WEST INDIES, MEDITERRANEAN AND AFRICA, and EASTERN COLONIES, of which North America included:

NORTH AMERICA

- Upper Canada, Lower Canada
- New Brunswick, Nova Scotia, Prince Edward Island
- Bermuda, Newfoundland

The Colonial Office and War Office, and also the Secretary of State for the Colonies and the Secretary of State for War, were separated in 1854, splitting military control of the Empire as colonial reserve or local forces fell under the control of colonial governors, most of whom were civilians, who reported to the Colonial Office (the exceptions being Imperial fortresses such as Bermuda with serving military officers, in command of both regular and reserve military units, as Governors). The War Office, after 1854 and until the 1867 confederation of the Dominion of Canada, split the military administration of the British colonial and foreign stations into nine districts: NORTH AMERICA AND NORTH ATLANTIC; WEST INDIES; MEDITERRANEAN; WEST COAST OF AFRICA AND SOUTH ATLANTIC; SOUTH AFRICA; EGYPT AND THE SUDAN; INDIAN OCEAN; AUSTRALASIA; and CHINA. NORTH AMERICA AND NORTH ATLANTIC included the following stations (or garrisons):

NORTH AMERICA AND NORTH ATLANTIC

- New Westminster (British Columbia)
- Newfoundland
- Quebec
- Halifax
- Kingston, Canada West
- Bermuda

With the buildup of the Dockyard over the first half of the 19th Century, there was a corresponding increase in the size of the Army garrison that was to protect it. This included the construction of numerous fortifications and coastal artillery batteries (the forts, by and large, were also built to house coastal artillery), manned by the Royal Artillery (Royal Garrison Artillery, or RGA), and camps where infantry troops were stationed.

From the beginning, the Royal Engineers were an important part of the Garrison, improving pre-existing fortifications and batteries, like Fort St. Catherine's, building new ones, surveying the island, building a causeway to link St. George's Island to the Main Island, a lighthouse at Gibb's Hill, and various other facilities. A system of military roads was built, also, as the rudimentary roads that had existed before had been used by islanders primarily to take the shortest route to the shore, with most passengers and wares moved around the archipelago by boats.

The Royal Army Ordnance Corps operated a depot at Ordnance Island, in St. George's, to supply munitions to the coastal artillery. A secret gunpowder store was also built underground at Agar's Island in 1870. Munitions were also held at the Royal Army Service Corps wharf on East Broadway, at the outskirts of the City of Hamilton. The RASC had another wharf in the town of St. George's near to Ordnance Island.

The St. George's Garrison was a large base including barracks and a hospital to the East and North of St. George's town. Used primarily by the RGA, following the infantry's relocation to Prospect Camp, this large base served the surrounding forts and batteries. As with the fortifications built previously by the colony's militia, the fortifications clustered most thickly at the East End of Bermuda, near St. George's. This was because the primary passage through the surrounding reefline brought vessels close to the Eastern shores of St. David's Island and St. George's Island. There were forts and batteries at other strategic locations throughout Bermuda, however.

Originally, most of the regular soldiers were deployed around St. George's, but with the development of the City of Hamilton in the central parishes, which had become the capital in 1815, and of the HM Dockyard at the West End, it became necessary to redeploy the army westwards as well. The heaviest cluster of forts and batteries remained at the East End, where shipping passed in through the reefline from the open Atlantic, and this meant that the artillery soldiers continued to concentrate most heavily at the East End. The infantry, however, established a large camp at the centre of Bermuda circa 1855. Located in Devonshire, on the outskirts of Hamilton, it was called Prospect Camp. The camp housed other units, as well, including Royal Garrison Artillery detachments at a fort built within the camp, Fort Prospect. Edison Studios' 1912 film The Relief of Lucknow was filmed in Bermuda, and extensive support was provided by the garrison, with personnel from the 2nd Battalion of the Queen's (Royal West Surrey) Regiment) appearing as extras, and parts of Prospect Camp providing sets (notably the clubhouse of the Garrison Golf Links, originally a private home added to Prospect Camp under the 1865 Defence Act and now a Bermuda National Trust property called Palmetto House). Bermuda and its garrison was also used as the location for another Edison film, For Valour, in which two army officers vie for the affections of a Bermudian woman during the Second Boer War. One of Daley's crew, James Gordon, returned to Bermuda in 1914 with Victory Photoplay Company to film "The Viking" and "The Mystery of the Poison Pool", both starring Betty Harte. The 2nd Battalion of the Lincolnshire Regiment, which had replaced the 2nd Battalion of the Queen's in January, 1914, provided soldiers as extras for the first film. Although Prospect Camp had extensive areas for training (in addition to its golf links), it was surrounded by public roads and residential areas, and had no safe area for a rifle range. Consequently, a second camp, Warwick Camp, was added primarily to provide rifle ranges to the soldiers of the Garrison, and the Dockyard's own Royal Marine detachment (and those of the ships stationed there).

Various other smaller sites were used by the Army over the history of the garrison. These included Watford Island and the southern half of Boaz Island, both part of the Admiralty land holdings attached to the HM Dockyard, where Clarence Barracks housed a considerable number of soldiers, and Agar's Island, where substantial underground munitions bunkers were built.

Although numerous Irish Catholic and Protestant soldiers and units had served in the British Army before the 19th Century, Catholicism had actually been outlawed in England and Ireland since the Reformation, and Ireland itself was nominally a separate state, the Kingdom of Ireland, ruled by a mostly-Protestant British settler minority. Enfranchisement of Catholics in Britain and its colonies followed the incorporation of the Kingdom of Ireland within the Kingdom of Great Britain, to form the United Kingdom of Great Britain and Ireland in 1801. The Roman Catholic Relief Act 1829 allowed British and Irish Catholics to sit in the Parliament. In Bermuda, the law permitted any church that legally operated in the United Kingdom to do so in the colony, and Presbyterian and Methodist churches operated freely alongside the Church of England. Although the Roman Catholic Church began to operate openly in Bermuda in the 19th century, its priests were not allowed, at first, to conduct baptisms, weddings or funerals. However, with large numbers of Catholic soldiers, particularly from Ireland, serving in the Bermuda Garrison, the first Catholic services were conducted by British Army chaplains during the 19th Century. Mount Saint Agnes Academy, a private school operated by the Roman Catholic Church of Bermuda, opened in 1890 at the behest of officers of the 86th (Royal County Down) Regiment of Foot (which was posted to Bermuda from 1880 to 1883), who had requested from the Archbishop of Halifax, Nova Scotia, a school for the children of Irish Catholic soldiers.

The 1853 to 1856 Crimean War highlighted the British Army's shortages of the men, material, and money to fight an expeditionary campaign against a large, modern army. Following the war, and the threat of invasion by France resulting from an assassination attempt on the French Emperor (perceived to originate in Britain), the British Army was under great pressure to provide a permanent force in Britain capable either of defending the country in case of invasion, or of mounting an expeditionary campaign similar to the Crimea. As its funding was not to be increased, it could only do this by redeploying units back to Britain from imperial garrison duty.

Britain's primary motivation in supporting the Ottoman Empire against Russia (and its serial attempts to prop-up friendly governments in the buffer state of Afghanistan) was to prevent the border of the Russian Empire advancing to meet that of British India. Potential Russian interference with Britain's East Asian trade was also a concern. Following the Great Mutiny of 1857, it was feared that Indian units might be encouraged to rebel should there be a Russian invasion, and might rebel in any case were British Army units in India reduced. This placed a greater importance on reducing garrisons in quieter parts of the empire, and on replacing them where required with locally raised reserve units.

In 1892, with the UK Government having tried for years in vain to encourage the Bermudian Government to raise part-time units to allow the reduction of the regular component of the garrison, the local parliament authorised the creation of the Bermuda Militia Artillery and the Bermuda Volunteer Rifle Corps as reserves for the RGA and the regular infantry.

The Bermudian parliament's prior reluctance to the creation of such units was partly due to the concern that social unrest might result from creating either racially segregated or integrated units, and partly due to fears that it would be saddled with the entire cost of the military defences. The Secretary of State for War finally achieved their support by ransoming Bermuda's nascent tourism industry.

Bermuda's tourism had arisen without conscious planning, and the hotels at first available to the wealthy visitors who pioneered holidaying on the island were generally small and uninspiring. Bermudian business and political leaders realised that a large, first-rate hotel was required. The development of the hotel hinged on American investment, however. Foreigners were not, at that time, permitted to buy land or businesses in Bermuda, lest their governments use protecting those interests as a pretext for invasion. The USA was seen, throughout the 19th Century, as the primary threat to Bermuda.

As the Secretary of State for War put it, Bermuda was, at the time, considered by the UK government more as a naval and military base than as a colony. Allowing American investment in the new hotel, as well as plans to widen the channel into St. George's Harbour (necessary in an age where ships had grown too large to safely use the existing channel, but which it was argued would make an invader's task easier), were seen as weakening Bermuda's defence. The Secretary of State for War insisted that he could not approve either project while Bermuda contributed nothing to her own defence. As a result, two Acts of the Bermudian Parliament were passed in 1892 authorising the creation of the Bermuda Volunteer Rifle Corps and the Bermuda Militia Artillery, and the project to build the Princess Hotel was allowed to move forward.

A third act had authorised the creation of a unit of submarine (underwater) miners militia. This would have followed in the pattern of the Submarine Mining Militia formed in Britain in 1878 and tasked with defending major ports. They received a minimum of fifty-five days training per year, and were recruited from experienced boatmen. In Bermuda, the unit was intended to operate boat from the Royal Army Service Corps docks in Hamilton and St. George's, tending to the underwater mine defences, but the unit was never raised.

Instead, the Royal Engineers 27th Company (Submarine Mining) which had been permanently reassigned from Halifax, Nova Scotia to Bermuda in 1888 (part of the company had been split off to create the new 40th Company, which remained in Halifax), continued to maintain the mine defences unaided. In 1900 the Royal Engineers Submarine Mining Companies also assumed responsibility for operating electric searchlights defending harbours.

Unit codes were assigned to all three legislated reserve units for marking the stock disks of the Martini-Henry rifle: M./BER. A. for the Bermuda Militia Artillery; V./BER. for the Bermuda Volunteers Rifle Corps; M./BER. S.M. for the Bermuda Submarine Miners. The part-time units were funded by the UK Government.

The trend from then on was to reduce the regular soldiers, and to shift an increasing part of the burden of the garrison on the part-time units. This process took many decades, however. The number of soldiers began to decline, and then quickly rose again. For the remainder of the 19th Century, military personnel made up a quarter of Bermuda's population, and defence spending, not agriculture or tourism, was the central leg of the Bermudian economy. Many wealthy American visitors actually brought their daughters to holiday on the island specifically in hopes of marrying them to the young, aristocratic military and naval officers who were posted to Bermuda (this put them in competition with local women, as Bermuda had a disproportionate number of spinsters). The new Princess Hotel made the most of this market, sponsoring dances and other social gatherings to which the officers of the garrison were invited to mingle with guests. The garrison provided bands and guards of honour for numerous social events that attracted residents and visitors, and the three garrison theatres were the primary venues of their kind in Bermuda.

In addition to components of the army garrison, the Royal Marines, part of the Royal Navy, maintained detachments at the Royal Naval Dockyard and aboard ships of the North America and West Indies Station based there, which included both Royal Marine Light Infantry and gunners of the Royal Marine Artillery. The various infantry detachments could be assembles ashore as a battalion, but detachments were most often scattered about the Americas with the ships of the station and not able to reinforce the military garrison. The Royal Marines did, however, provide the garrison in 1825.

== First World War ==
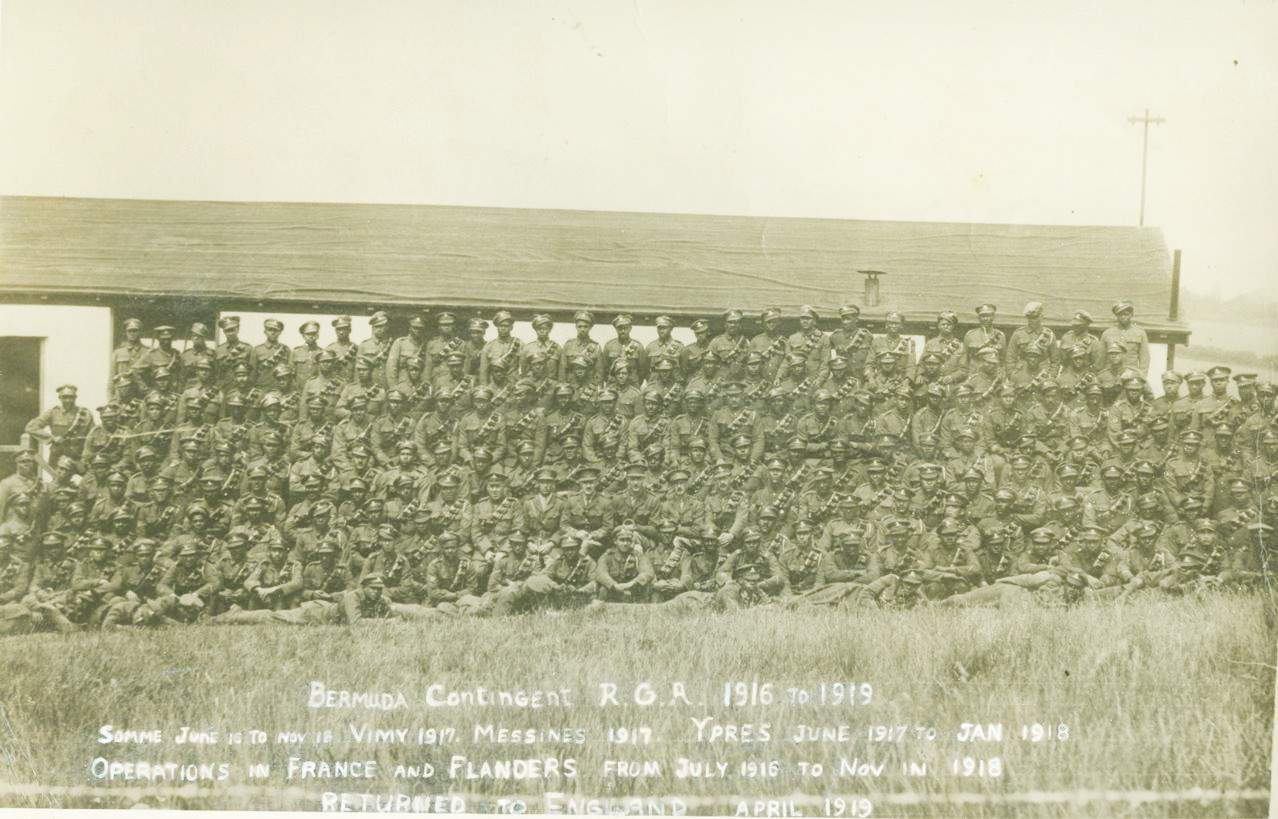
The Bermuda Contingent of the Royal Garrison Artillery

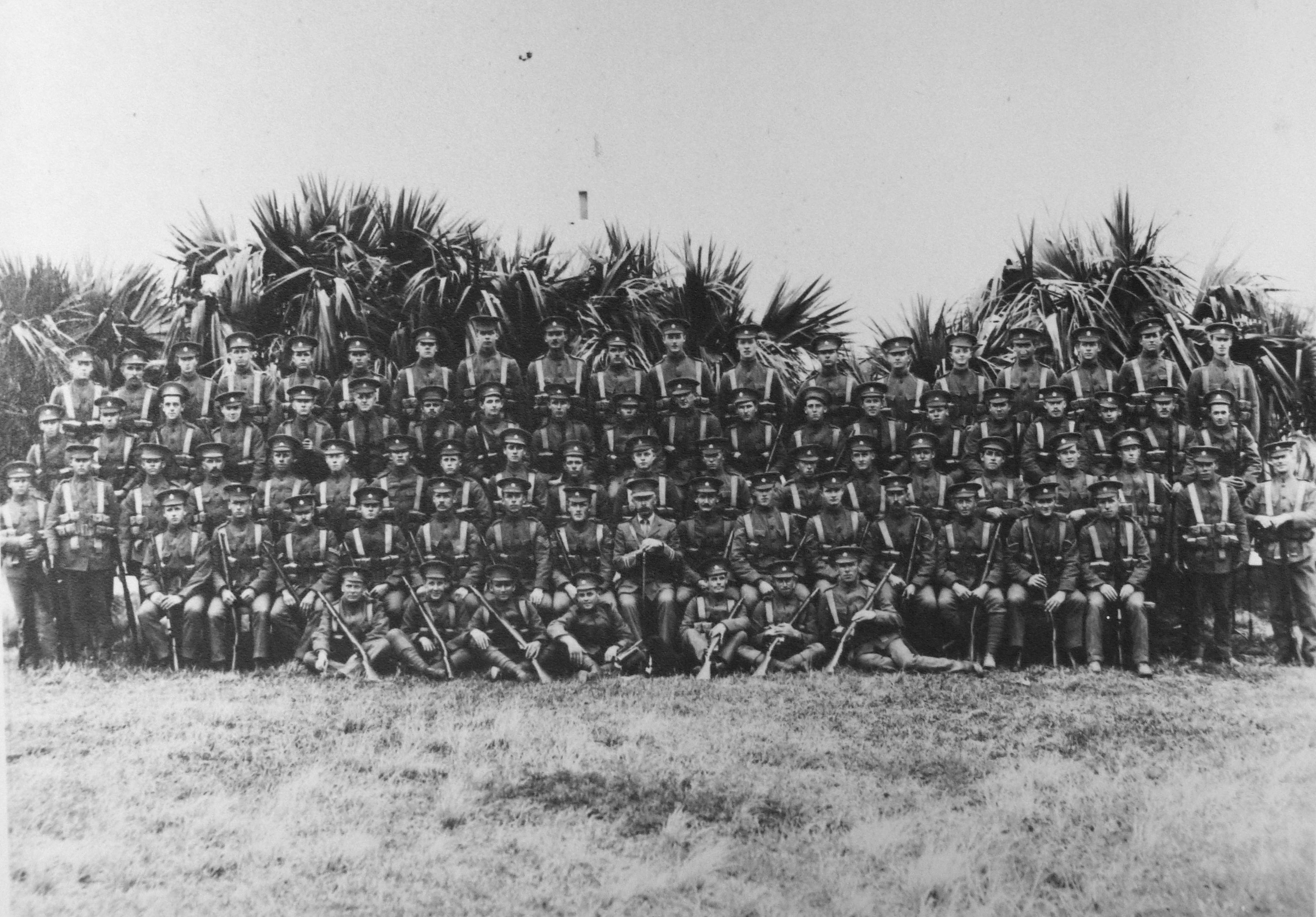
The First Contingent of the BVRC to the Lincolns, training in Bermuda for the Western Front, Winter 1914–15.

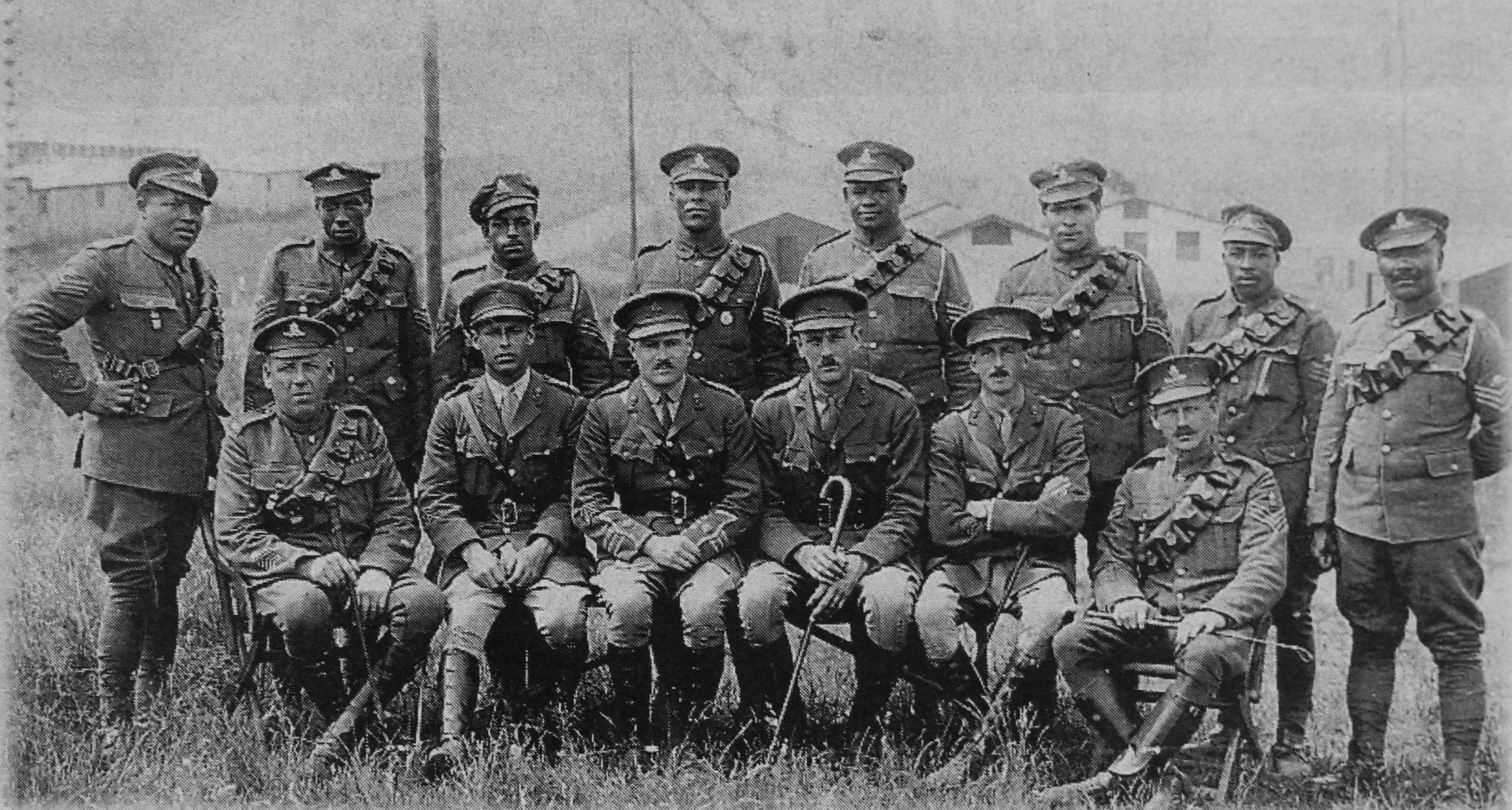
Officers and senior enlisted men of the Bermuda Contingent, Royal Garrison Artillery, in Europe.

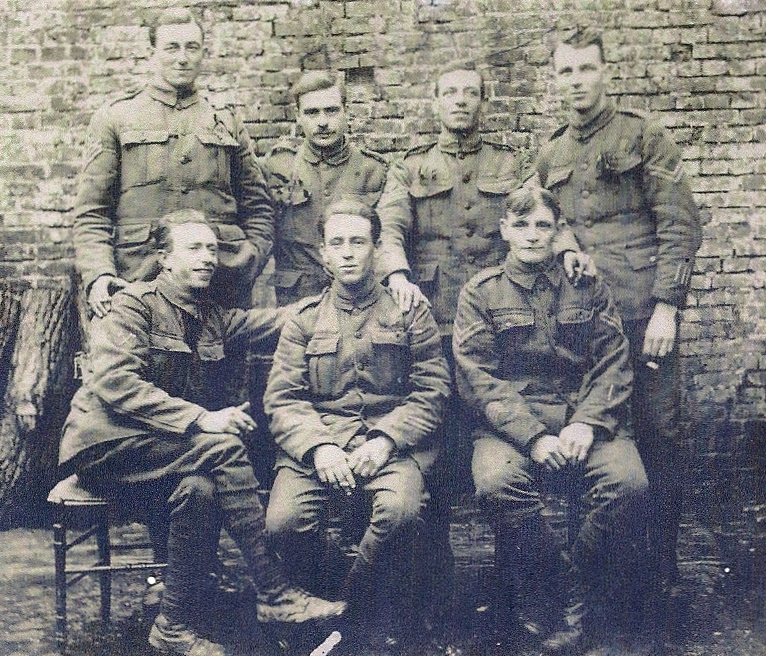
Bermuda Volunteer Rifle Corps soldiers with the Lincolnshire Regiment in France, 1918

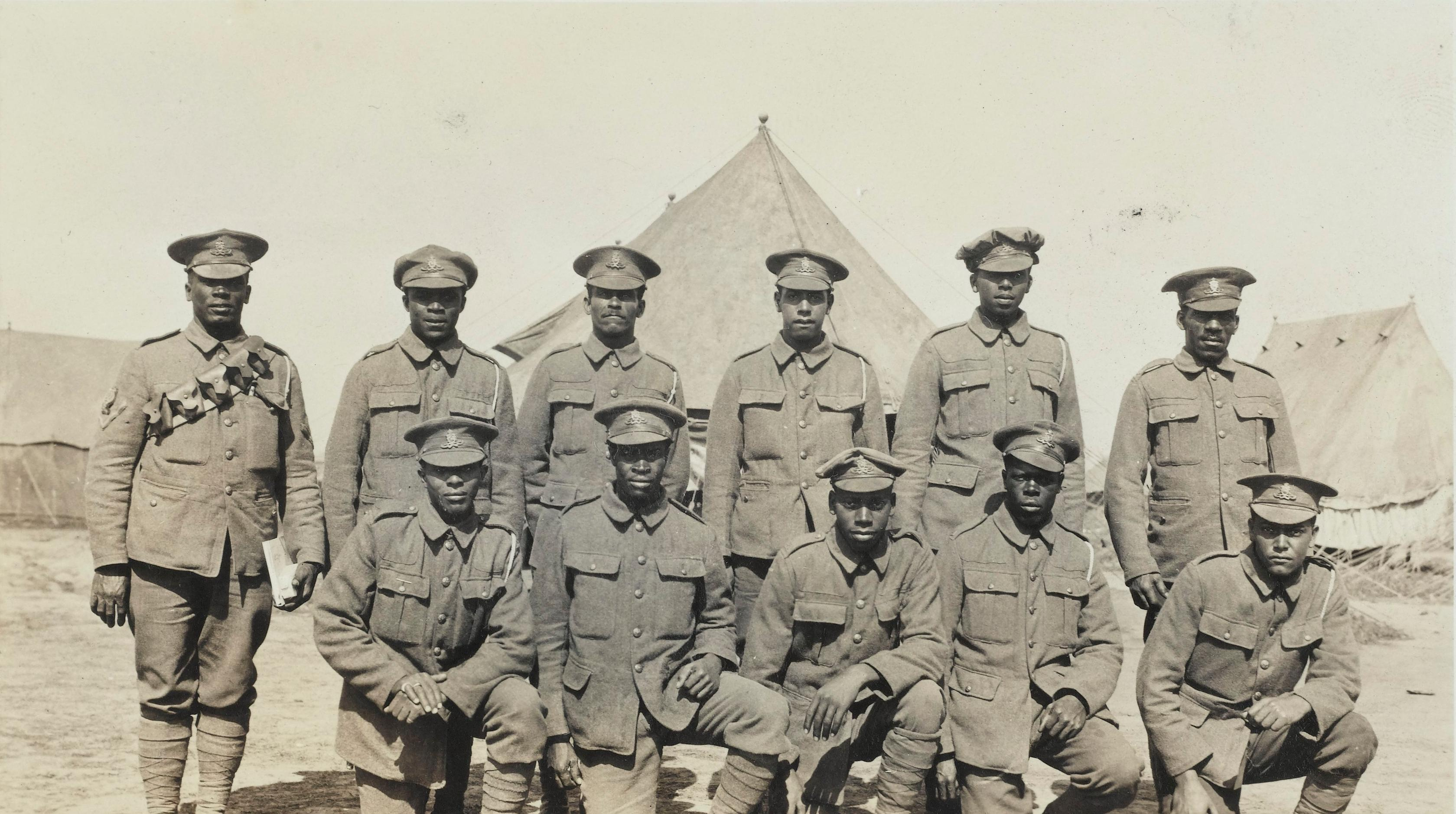
Soldiers of the Bermuda Contingent of the Royal Garrison Artillery in a Casualty Clearing Station in July, 1916

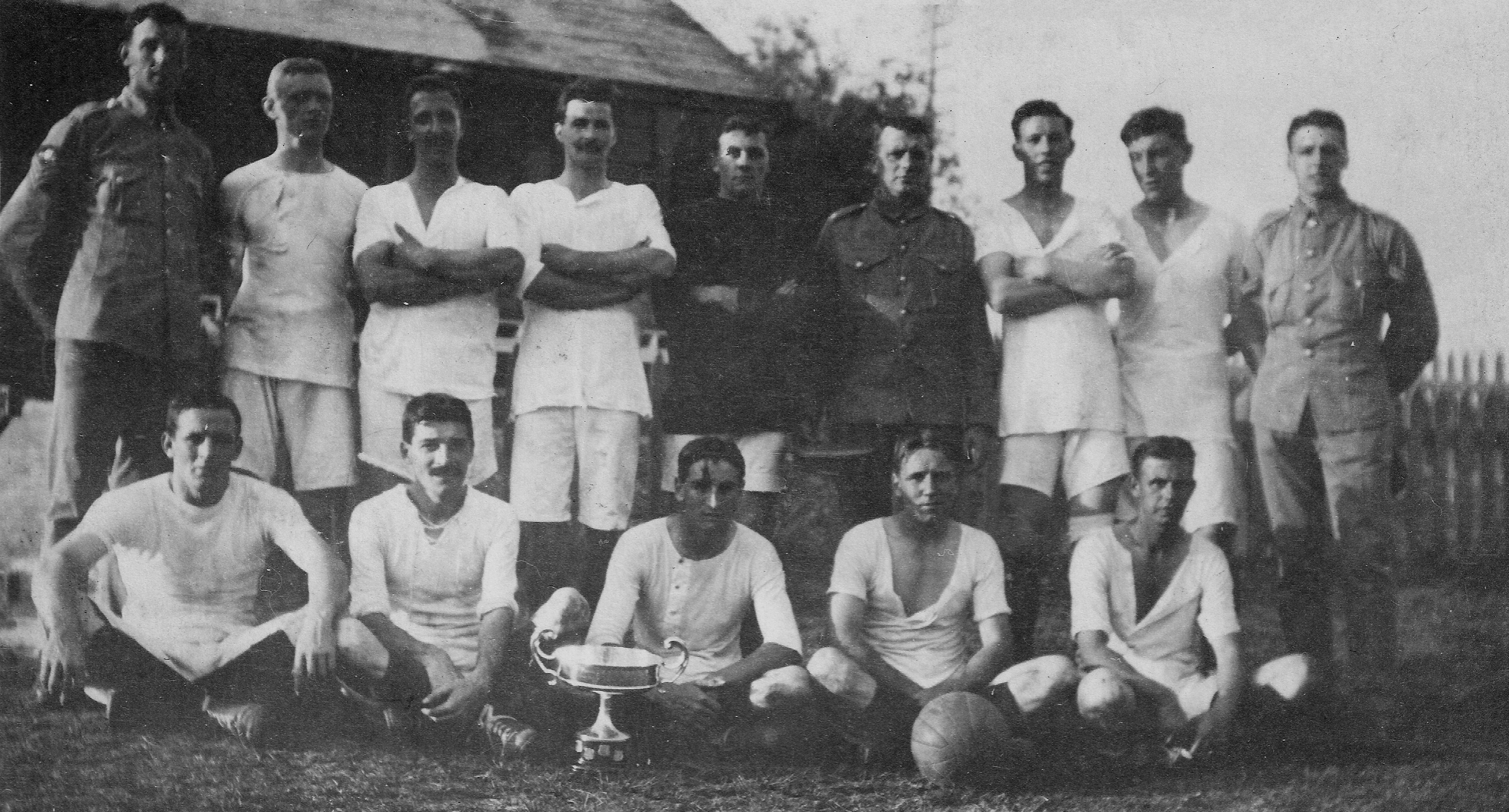
The football team of 95 Company, Royal Garrison Artillery, victors in the 1917 Governor's Cup football match, pose with the cup.

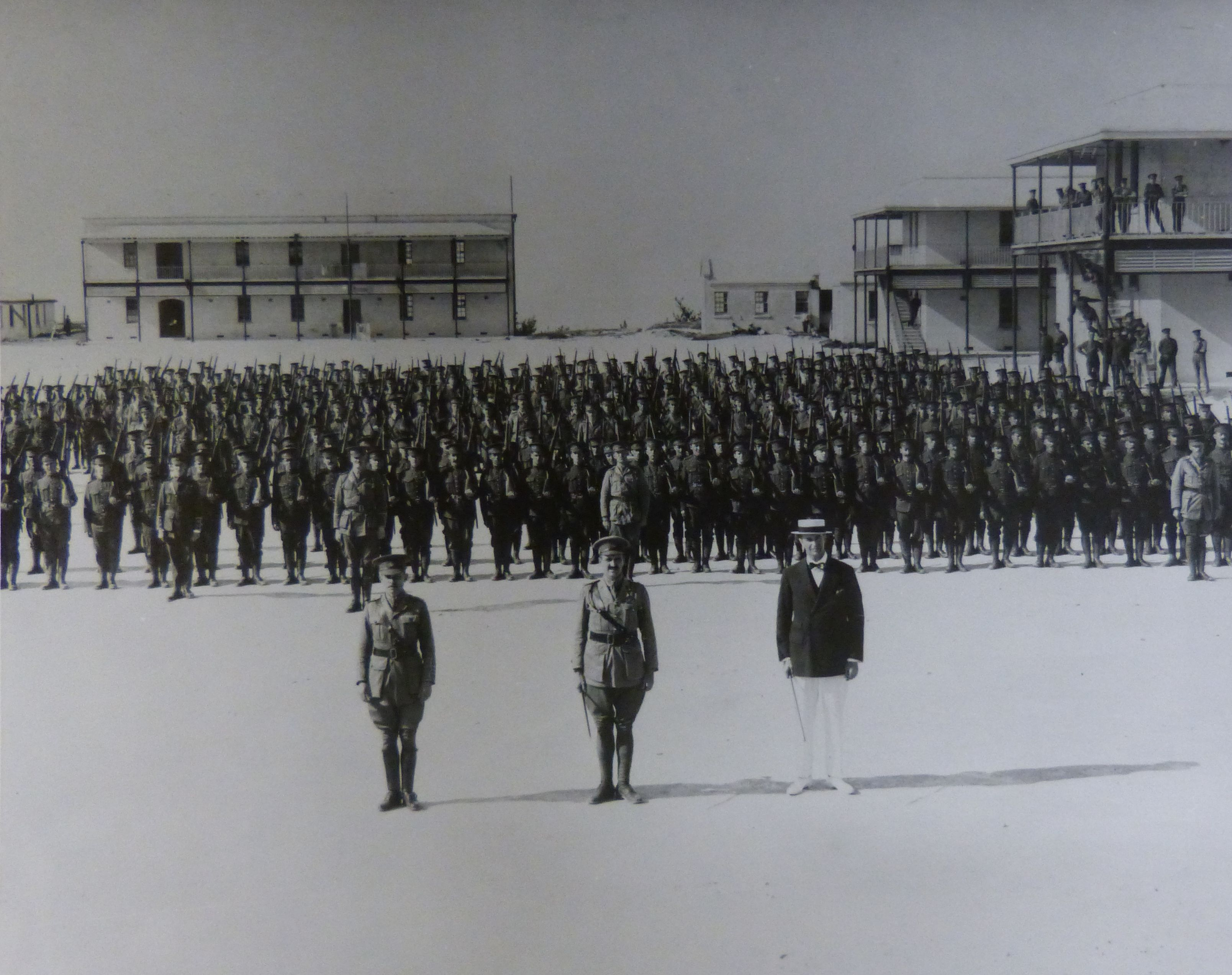
38th Battalion, CEF, at Prospect Camp in 1915

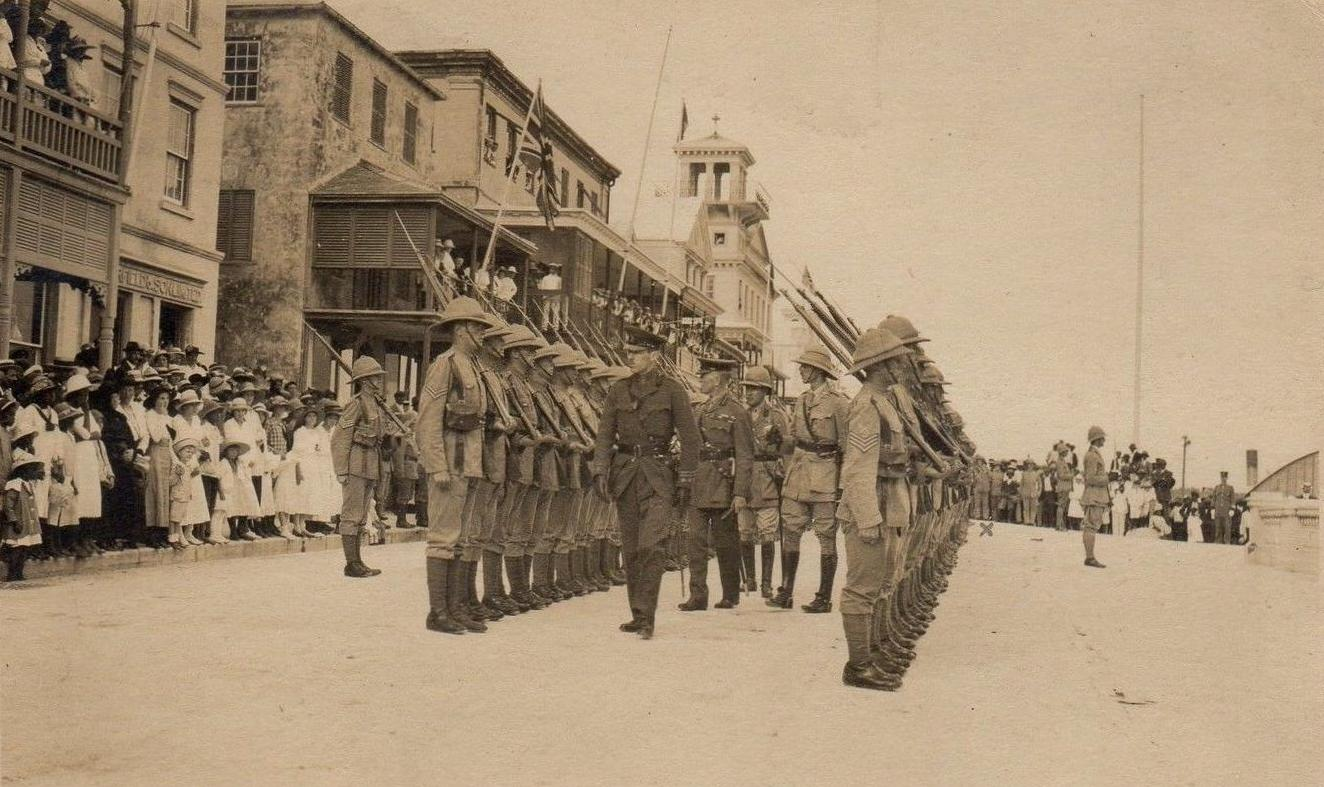
2/4th Bn East Yorkshire Regiment and General Sir James Willcocks in Hamilton, Bermuda in 1917

On the declaration of the First World War, Lieutenant-Colonel George Bunbury McAndrew, the commanding officer of the 2 Battalion, the Lincolnshire Regiment, was acting governor of Bermuda as the actual governor, Commander-in-Chief and Vice-Admiral (Bermuda's governors, from the time the bases were built up, were normally military officers, especially from the Royal Engineers or the Royal Artillery), Lieutenant-General Sir George Bullock was off the island, and oversaw Bermuda's placement onto a war footing. Lt. Gen. Bullock resumed command on his return to Bermuda, and was succeeded as governor and commander-in-chief by General Sir James Willcocks in May, 1917.

The 2 Lincolns were soon sent to England, preparatory to deployment to France, being replaced by a succession of Canadian battalions. On 19 August 1914, the British Government requested from the Adjutant General of the Canadian Militia a Canadian battalion to replace the 2 Lincolns, a request that was agreed to on 22 August by Lieutenant-Colonel Alfred Octave Fages, commanding the Royal Canadian Regiment. As with soldiers of the British Territorial Force (including the BVRC and BMA), Canadian Militia soldiers were recruited for home defence, and could not be compelled to serve overseas. Consequently, the soldiers of the RCR were asked to volunteer as a unit to the deployment. The unit relieved the 2 Lincolns at Prospect Camp on 13 September 1914. It would use the next eleven months in Bermuda to train in preparation for the Western Front. When it was deployed across the Atlantic on 13 August 1915, it was replaced by the 38th Battalion of the Canadian Expeditionary Force (CEF). When this battalion, too, deployed to the European theatre of conflict, it was replaced by the 163rd (French-Canadian) Battalion CEF, which arrived there on 29 May 1916. It was replaced by a British Territorial Force unit, the 2/4th Battalion, East Yorkshire Regiment on 18 November 1916, and departed for Europe on 27 November 1916. The 2/4th East Yorks remained in Bermuda for the duration of the war.

On the declaration of War in 1914, the BMA was already embodied for annual training and moved onto a war footing. The BVRC embodied, and both units took up their wartime roles. Many Bermudians also enlisted or were commissioned into other British Army units in the United Kingdom and elsewhere, and in dominion military units, the latter including a significant number of Bermudians in the CEF.

The BMA immediately began the process of forming a contingent of volunteers in 1914 to be despatched to the Western Front, but was prevented from doing so. However, two contingents eventually served as part of the larger Royal Garrison Artillery detachment to the Western Front. The first, 201 officers and men, under the command of Major Thomas Melville Dill (who handed overall command of the BMA to a subordinate in order to lead the overseas contingent), left for France on 31 May 1916. A second contingent, of two officers and sixty other ranks, left Bermuda on 6 May 1917, and was merged with the first contingent in France. The contingent, titled the Bermuda Contingent, Royal Garrison Artillery, served primarily in ammunition supply, at dumps, and in delivering ammunition to batteries in the field. The Contingent served at the Somme from June to December 1916. They were then moved away from the Front, serving on docks until April, 1917, when they were attached to the Canadian Corps at Vimy Ridge, serving in the battle for Vimy Ridge. They were at Ypres, from 24 June until 22 October, where three men were killed and several wounded. Two men received the Military Medal. In Bermuda, the BMA was demobilised on 31 December 1918, and when the overseas contingent returned in July, 1919, it was to no unit. Thirty men who chose to remain on temporarily re-enlisted in the RGA, and the rest were demobilised. The unit was re-embodied on 3 June 1920, when its previous members were called up and joined by fifty new recruits.

The BVRC formed a company-sized contingent, Captain Richard Tucker and 88 other ranks, in December 1914, which trained over the winter and spring before being sent to England in June, 1915. As there was a shortage of officers, the Governor and Commander-in-Chief, Lieutenant-General Sir George Bullock, filled the role of adjutant, a position normally filled by a captain. As a consequence, the contingent was popularly known as Bullock's Boys. It had been intended for the contingent to join the 2 Lincolns, but that battalion was already in France when they arrived and it became an extra company of 1 Lincolns, instead, deployed to the Western Front in July. It had lost more than half of its strength by September, 1916, and could no longer compose a rifle company. It was merged with the newly arrived BVRC Second Contingent, of one officer and 36 other ranks, who had trained in Bermuda as Vickers machine gunners. They were stripped of their Vickers machine guns and retrained as Lewis light machinegunners, providing 12 gun teams to 1 Lincolns headquarters. By the War's end, the two contingents had lost over 75% of their combined strength. Forty had died on active service, one received the O.B.E, and six the Military Medal. Sixteen enlisted men from the two contingents were commissioned, including the sergeant major of the First Contingent, Colour-Sergeant R.C. Earl, who would become commanding officer of the BVRC after the War. In 1918, 1 Lincolns was withdrawn from France and sent to Ireland to combat the army of the Irish Republic, declared in the 1916 Easter Rising.

== Between the wars ==
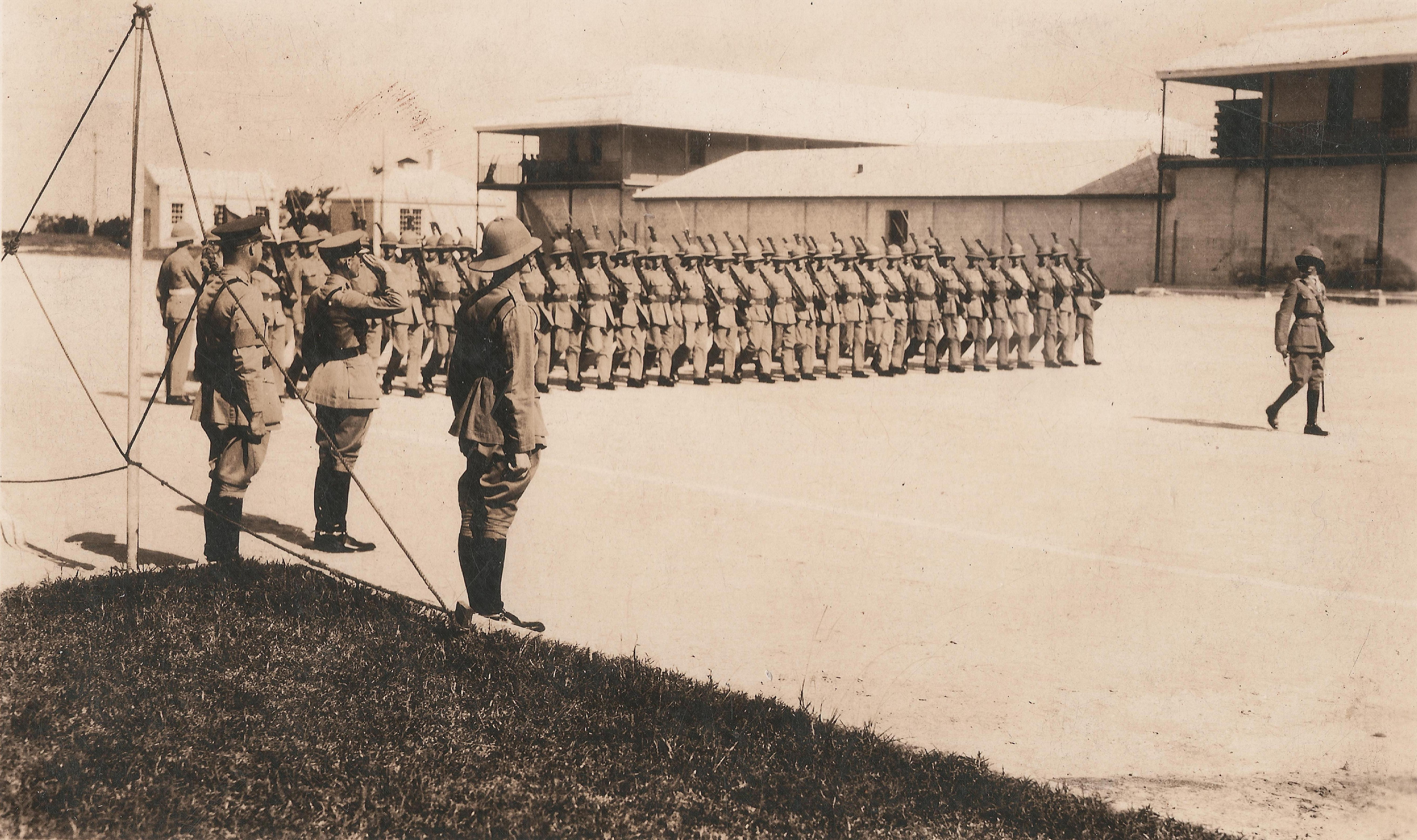
Governor of Bermuda Lieutenant-General Sir Louis Bols takes salute from the 1st Battalion, West Yorkshire Regiment (Prince of Wales's Own) at Prospect Camp in 1930

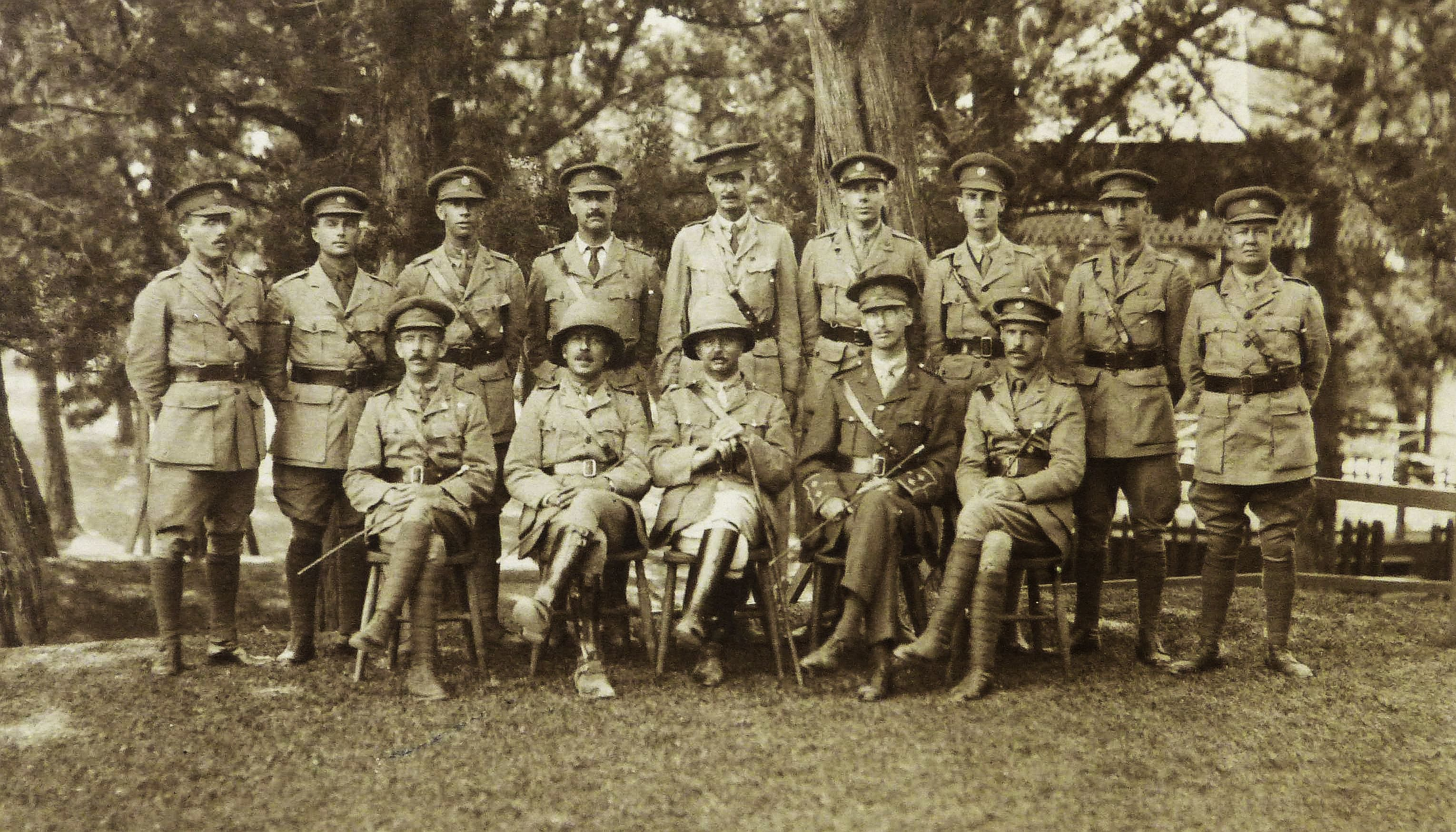
BVRC officers attached to 2/4th Bn East Yorkshire Regiment in 1918

The inter-war period finally saw the significant reduction of the regular army components of the garrison, and the transfer of most of their roles to the part-time territorial units. In 1928, the regular Royal Artillery coastal artillery units and the Royal Engineers Fortress Company were withdrawn, with their roles taken up respectively by the BMA and the new Bermuda Volunteer Engineers (BVE), raised in 1931. The coastal artillery forts and batteries were all mothballed or permanently removed from use except for St. David's Battery, which continued in the role of Examination Battery, watching over the channel through which shipping passed through Bermuda's surrounding barrier reef. The regular army infantry battalion was replaced by a company detached from whatever battalion was deployed to Jamaica (the unit on garrison continued to be replaced every three years). This consequently increased the requirement for part-time infantrymen. As the manpower requirements of the artillery had been reduced with the closure of most of the batteries, a new unit, the Bermuda Militia Infantry, was raised, grouped administratively with the BMA and likewise recruiting black soldiers, in 1939. That year, with war imminent, a new coastal artillery battery, with two 6 inch RBL guns, was built on a hill within Warwick Camp, intended to prevent naval vessels from bombarding the Royal Naval Dockyard from off Bermuda's South Shore. As with St. David's Battery, the guns were manned by the BMA and the Defence Electric Lights by the BVE.

== Second World War ==
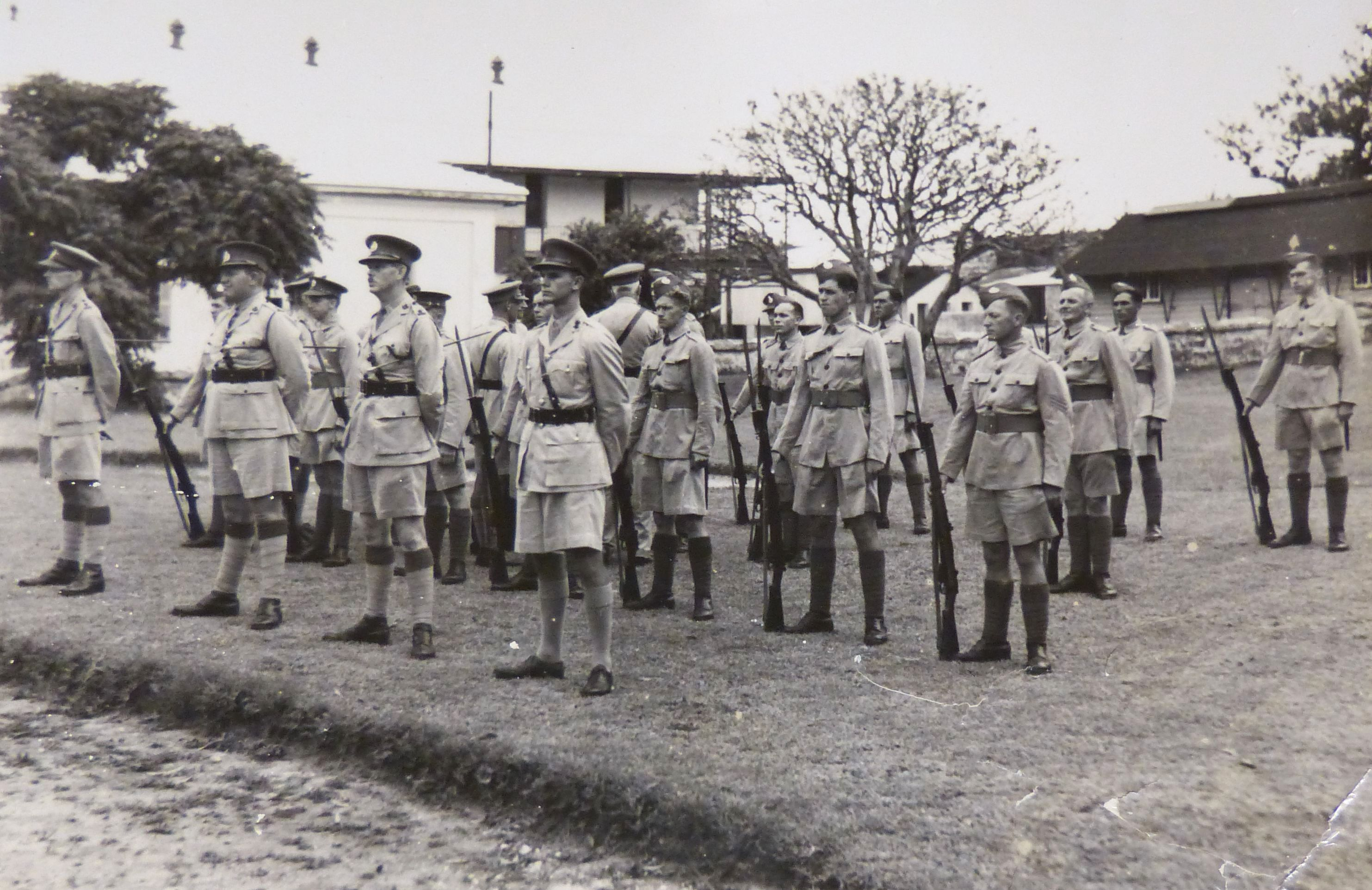
Governor and General Officer Commanding, Lieutenant-General Sir Denis Bernard, inspects the First BVRC Contingent to the Lincolnshire Regiment at Prospect Camp on 22 June 1940.

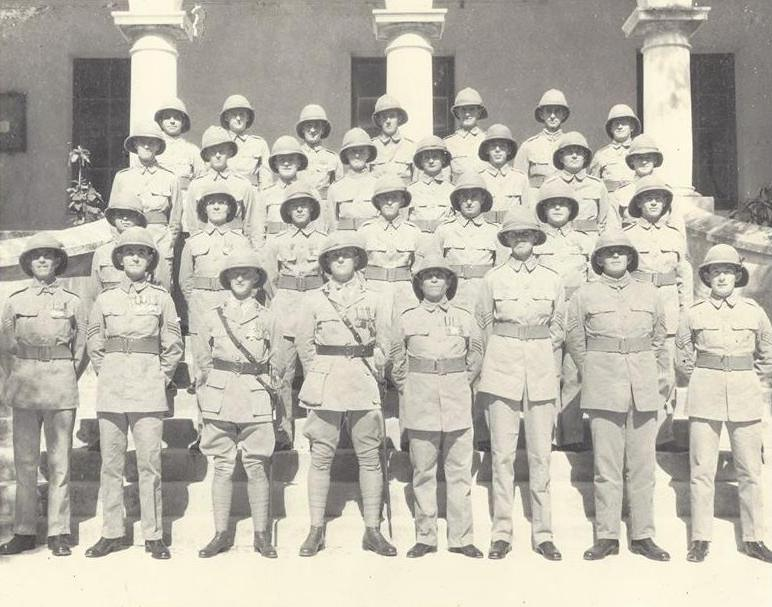
Bermuda Volunteer Engineers 1934

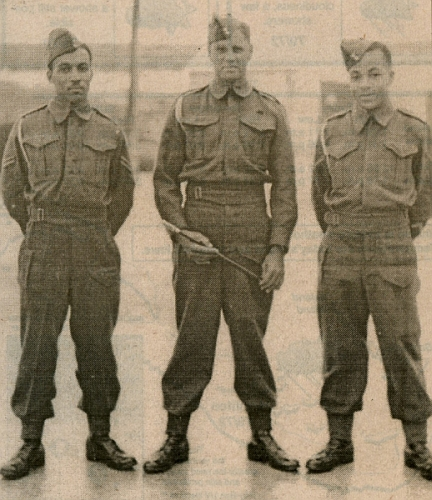
Warrant Officer and NCOs of the BMA at the Examination Battery, St. David's, Bermuda, ca. 1944.

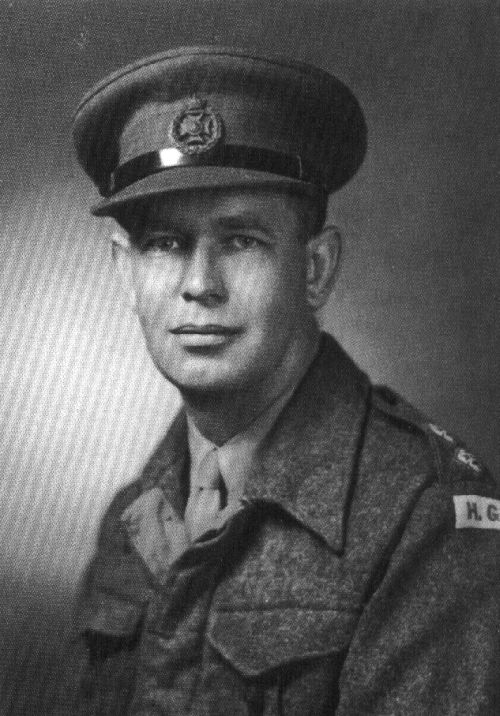
Lieutenant Percy Reginald Tucker Bermuda Home Guard

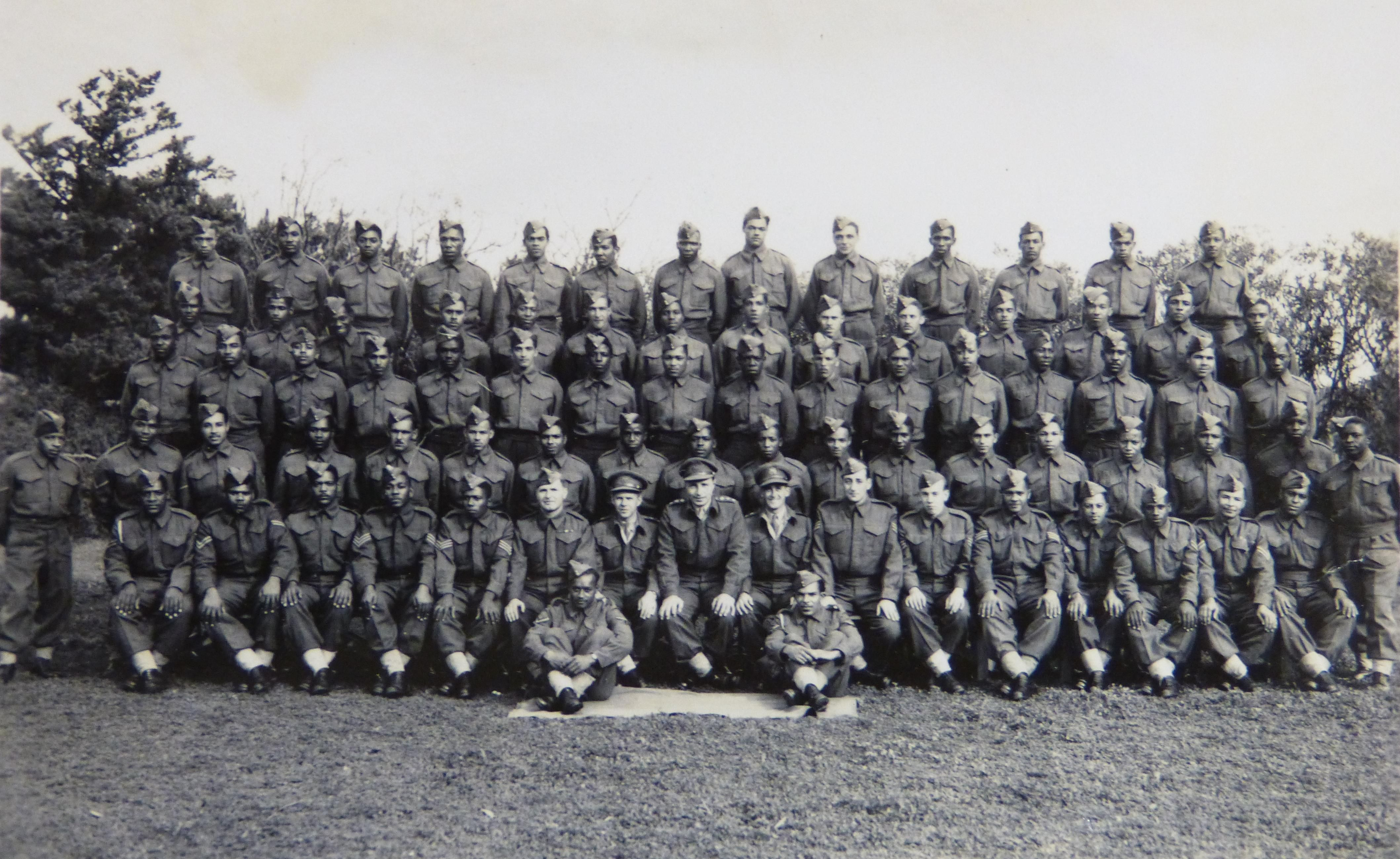
B Company Bermuda Militia Infantry in 1944

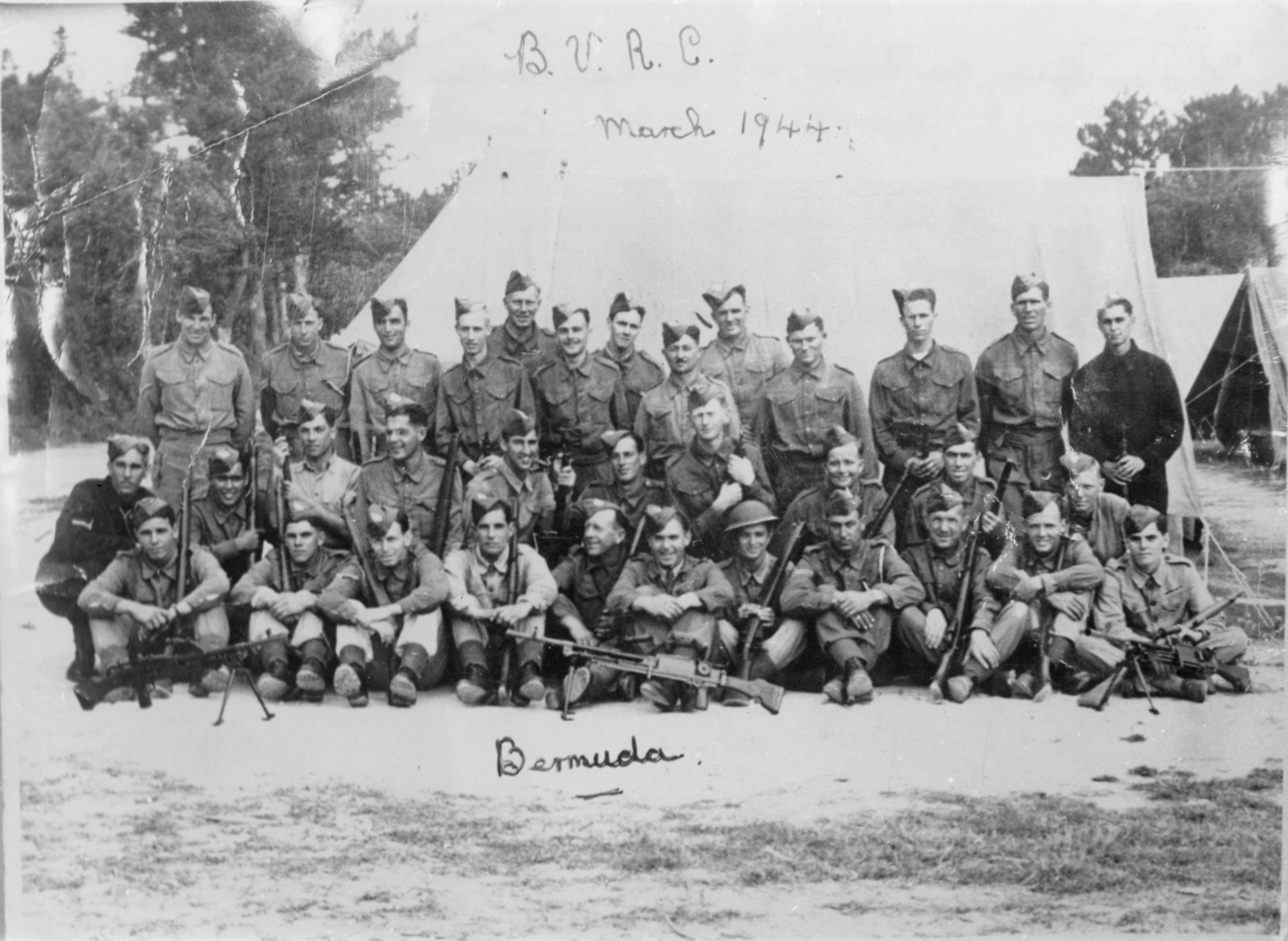
Bermuda Volunteer Rifle Corps platoon in March 1944

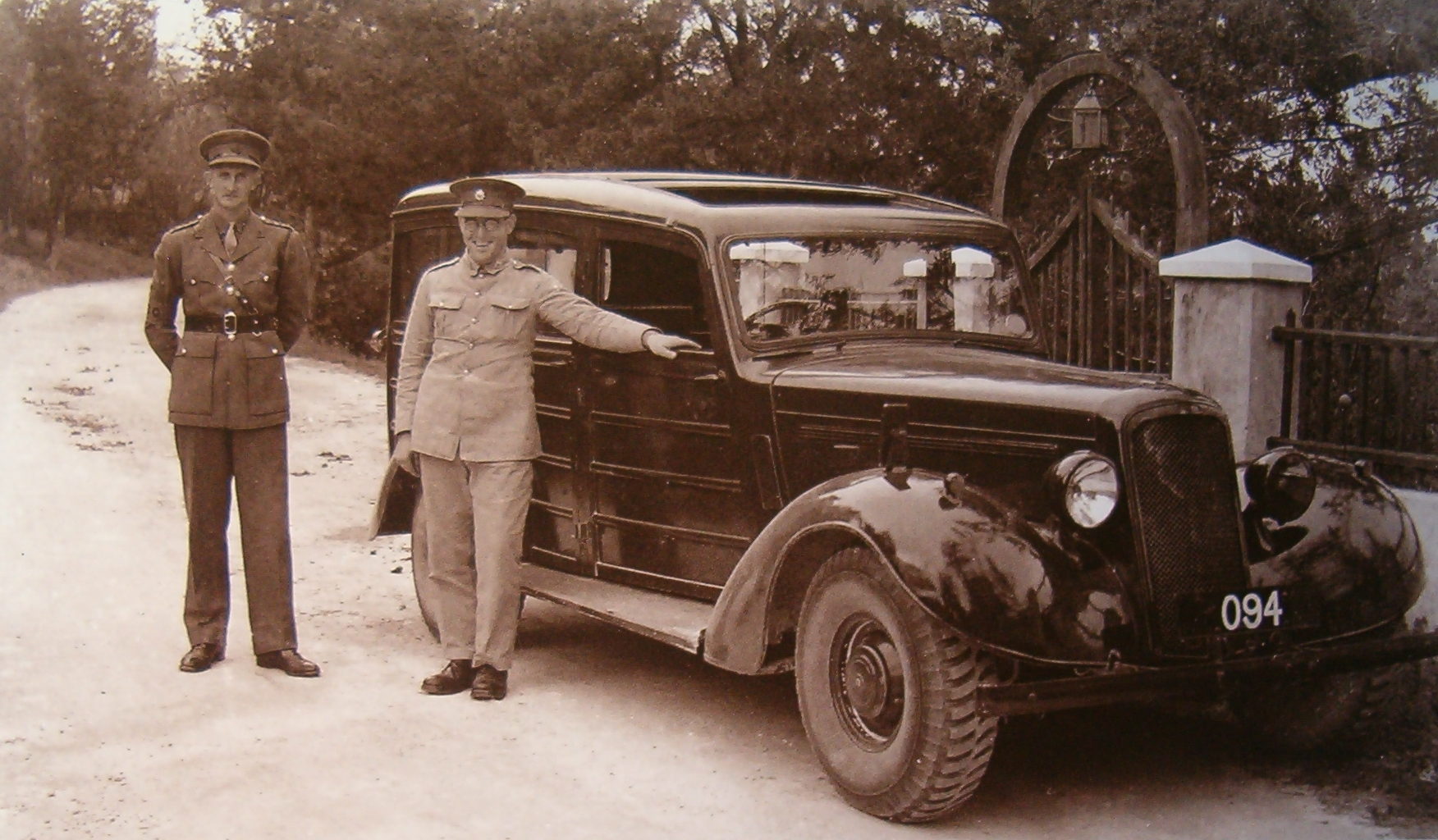
An officer in the temperate Service Dress and soldier in the other ranks tropical Service Dress in Bermuda, in 1942.

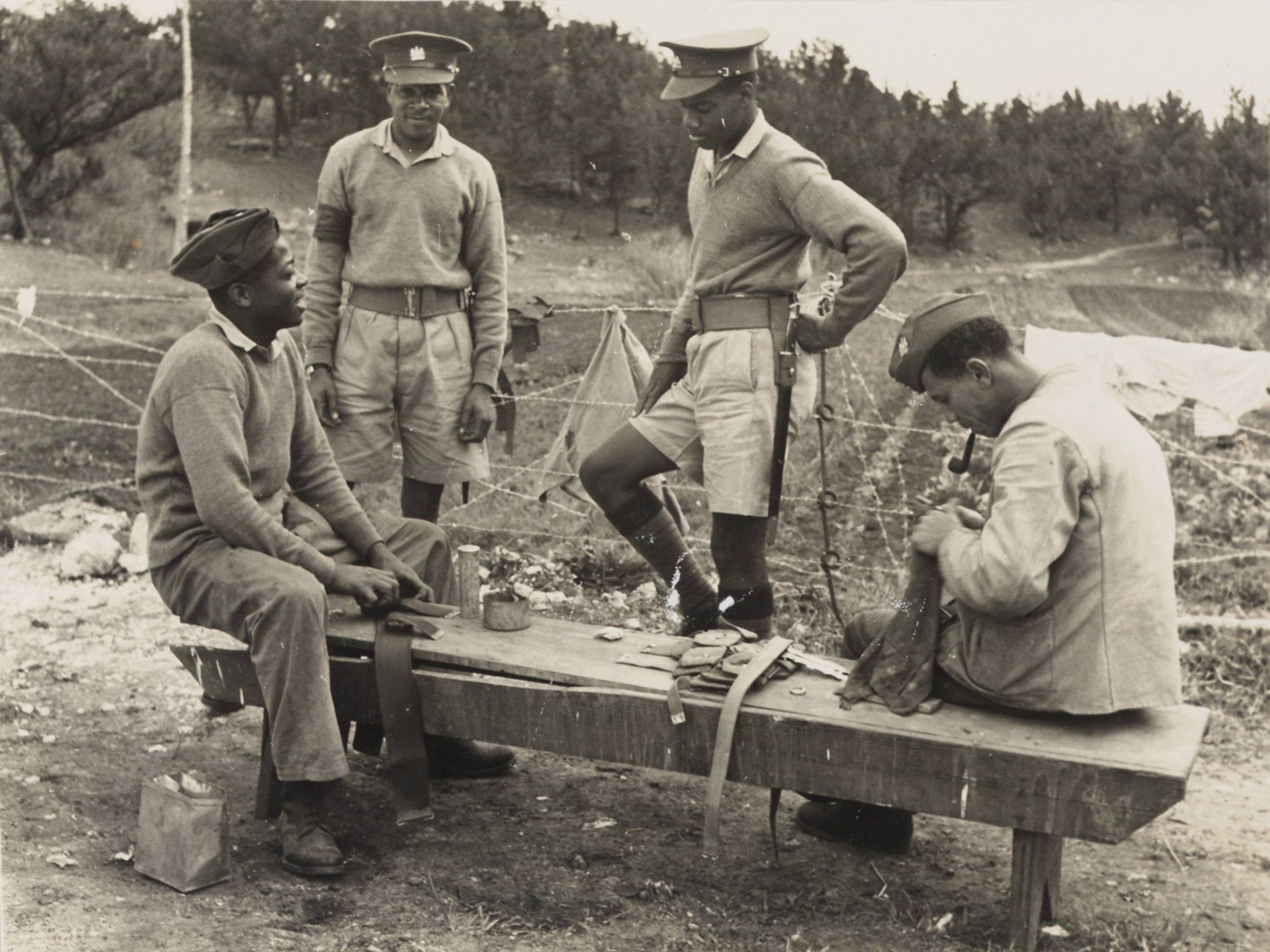
Bermuda Militia Infantry soldiers in camp

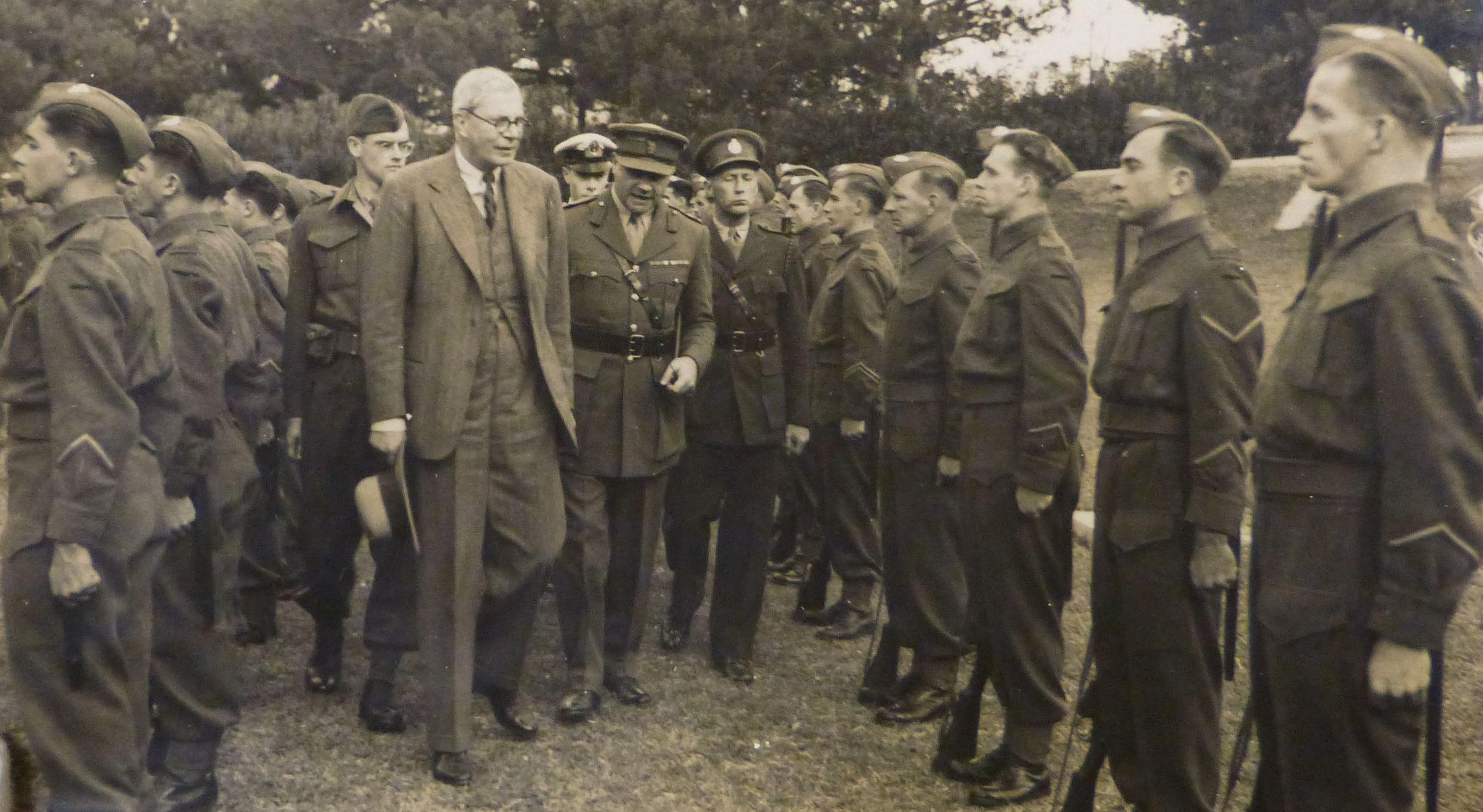
Secretary of State for the Colonies Oliver Stanley inspects a BVRC honour guard at Prospect Camp on 30 December 1944.

During the Second World War, as had been the case during the First World War, the units posted to Bermuda to provide the regular infantry company on garrison included reserve units from the Canadian Army (as the Canadian Militia had been renamed in 1940), embodied for the duration of the war. At the start of the war a company of the 2nd Battalion, King's Shropshire Light Infantry was on deployment to Bermuda. They were succeeded by the Canadian Army's Winnipeg Grenadiers in 1940, a company of the 4th Battalion, Queen's Own Cameron Highlanders (including future Major Donald Henry "Bob" Burns, MC, who would be a Second-in-Command of the Bermuda Regiment, Town Crier of St. George's, and Guinness world record holder for loudest human speaking voice) in 1942, and a company of the Canadian Pictou Highlanders from 1942 to 1946.

As during the First World War, the part-time units were again mobilized for the duration (The Bermuda Militia Artillery and the Bermuda Volunteer Engineers at mid-day on 24 August 1939, in anticipation of the 1 September invasion of Poland by Germany, and preparatory to the 3 September declaration of war against Germany, with the Bermuda Volunteer Rifle Corps preparing for embodiment, but not actually embodied until 4 September 1939), becoming full-time. Conscription was quickly introduced, with all military-age British males resident in Bermuda liable for service. The regular army infantry company operated the headquarters of the Garrison at Prospect Camp, and took responsibility for patrolling and guarding in the central parishes. The BVRC took responsibility for patrolling and defending the East End of Bermuda, and the BMI for the West End. In addition to maintaining guards at the Dockyard and Darrell's Island, the infantry soldiers guarded the trans-Atlantic cable facilities, beaches and inlets, patrolled the island, and operated motor boat patrols.

The BMA manned the Examination Battery in St. David's, which guarded the primary entrance through the reefs to Bermuda's harbours from the open Atlantic. By 1939, this was the only fixed battery left in use in Bermuda, though others were theoretically able to be returned to use. Similar 6" guns were fixed at the Dockyard, but it was felt that a capital ship could potentially bombard the Dockyard from off the South Shore, out of range of both batteries. As a result, a new battery was built on a hilltop within Warwick Camp, with two 6" guns mounted there. These too were manned by the BMA.

The Bermuda Volunteer Engineers filled two roles. They continued to operate spot lamps at the coastal artillery batteries, lighting targets for the BMA gun crews at night. In 1937, the BVE had also absorbed the BVRC's signals section, and assumed responsibility for providing signals detachments for all branches of the garrison, as well as to the Royal Naval Dockyard and to the RAF air station at Darrell's Island.

The BVRC sent a draft to the Lincolns (with volunteers from the other local units attached for the transit) in 1940, following which concern of denuding the garrison meant a moratorium was placed on any further drafts overseas by the local units (although many soldiers were released from their units to train as pilots at the Bermuda Flying School on Darrell's Island). The school only accepted volunteers from amongst those already serving in one of the local army units. Eighty-eight men were sent to the Royal Air Force and Fleet Air Arm before the school closed in 1942, following which it was reorganised as a recruiting arm for the Royal Canadian Air Force, sending 200 aircrew trainees to that service. The Bermuda Flying School was headed by Major Montgomery-Moore, DFC, who was also the commanding officer of the BVE.

In addition to the British Army and Royal Naval units in Bermuda during the War, a Royal Canadian Navy base, HMCS Somers Isles, operated at the former Royal Naval site at Convict Bay, and four airbases were operated in Bermuda – one by the Royal Navy's Fleet Air Arm, the Royal Air Force used RAF Darrell's Island, the US Navy operated flying boats from the US Naval Operating Base, and the US Army Air Force and the RAF shared an airfield built by the US Army, Kindley Field.

Although air and naval units based in Bermuda played an active part in the War, the Axis Powers never launched a direct attack on the colony. The considerable buildup of the American Bermuda Base Command of artillery and infantry forces and air bases in Bermuda began in April 1941 under the Destroyers for Bases Agreement. With the US entry into the war in 1942, as well as the decreased danger posed by German surface ships and submarines, the moratorium preventing local units sending drafts overseas was lifted in 1943. The Home Guard was raised at the same time, conscripting for part-time service from those men who had been exempted from full-time service. The unit took over some of the duties of the BMI and the BVRC, enabling the full-time units to send contingents overseas.

The BVRC sent a second detachment to the Lincolnshire Regiment, and the Bermuda Militia (Artillery and Infantry together) sent a draft which formed the training cadre and the core of the new Caribbean Regiment.

Other than those needed to defend their bases, US ground forces were withdrawn on the war's end.

== 1945 to 1957 ==
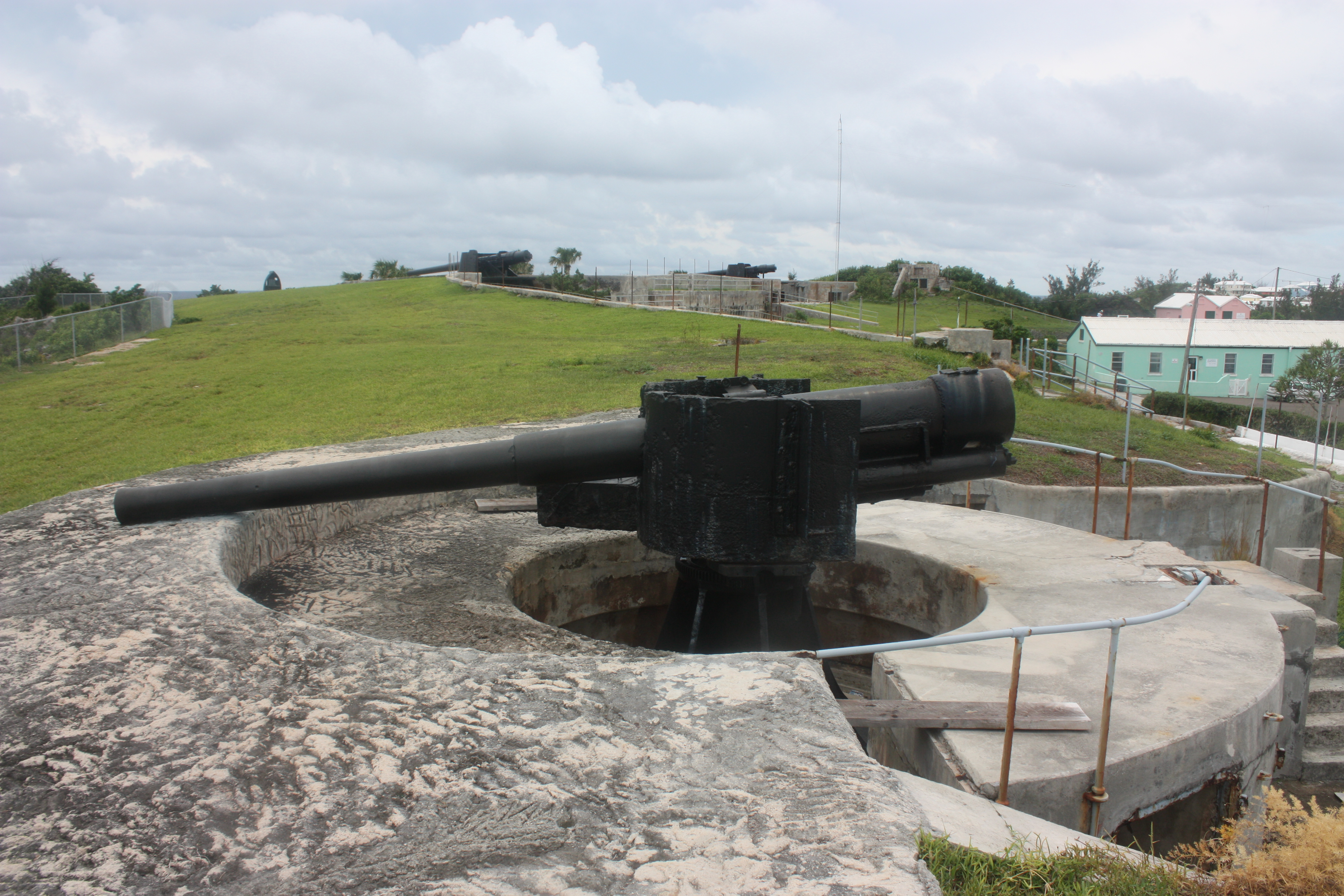
One of two 6 inch RBLs, with the two 9.2 inch RBLs visible beyond, at St. David's Battery, in 2011

Following the war, the BVE and BMI, as well as the Home Guard, ceased to existed. The BMA and BVRC were both demobilised, reduced to skeleton staffs. Both were quickly built back up to strength in 1951, and conscription, which had been used during the war, was re-introduced for both units (the BVRC suitably being retitled simply Bermuda Rifles), although the conscripts served on a part-time basis, whereas wartime service had been full-time for the duration. The last coastal artillery, the Examination Battery on St. David's Head, was removed from use in 1953, and the BMA converted to the infantry role (but remained nominally part of the Royal Regiment of Artillery). The last Imperial Defence Plan was issued the same year. After that, the local units no longer had a role under Imperial defence planning.

The regular garrison continued to include a full infantry company of 250 soldiers, plus attachments to, and detachments from other corps ("atts and dets"), such as the Royal Electrical and Mechanical Engineers. A company of the Gloucestershire Regiment was posted to Prospect Camp in 1947, but this was sent to British Honduras the following year in response to a Guatemalan threat of invasion. Three Bermudians who had served in the BVRC during the war (Bernard L. Martin, Robert Wheatley, and Vernon Smith) re-enlisted into the Gloucestershire Regiment during its posting in Bermuda and subsequently took part in the Battle of Imjin River, during the Korean War. The Glosters were replaced by a detachment of The Highland Brigade in 1949.

In 1951, it was announced that the Royal Naval Dockyard would be closed, with much of its establishment withdrawn immediately. The process of running the naval base down would stretch over the rest of the decade (though part of the base, HMS Malabar, would operate until 1995). In November 1952, it was decided to withdraw the Regular Army garrison, too, which was completed by 1 May 1953. However, during the Bermuda Conference of 4 to 8 December 1953, the Prime Minister, Sir Winston Churchill, met with the US President Dwight D. Eisenhower and French Premier Joseph Laniel in the colony to discuss the security of Western Europe. A detachment of the Royal Welch Fusiliers had to be brought in for the period of the conference. The concerns of the Government of Bermuda and other interested parties were put to the Prime Minister during his stay in Bermuda, and as a result 'A' Company, 1st Battalion, Duke of Cornwall's Light Infantry (1 DCLI) arrived to resume garrison duty at Prospect Camp in 1954.

The 1957 Defence White Paper ended National Service, and stipulated the reduction of the Regular Army to 165,000. Given the much smaller size of the army, the high cost per man of the Bermuda Garrison, and two part-time units in Bermuda (and which were capable of absorbing the responsibilities or the regular detachment), it was decided to withdraw the DCLI and all other regular soldiers (other than Permanent Staff Instructors and other attachments to the territorial units and the Aide-de-camp (ADC) to the Governor) from Bermuda by the end of May. This was despite strong arguments in the House of Commons for the retention of the Garrison by Bermuda-raised Denis Keegan, the Member of Parliament (MP) for Nottingham South, and Frederic Bennett, MP for Torquay. A Company DCLI reunited with E Company, which had been posted to British Honduras, and both were returned to England. The Officer Commanding A Company, Major J. Anthony Marsh, DSO, a Second World War veteran of the Special Air Service, took permanent residence in Bermuda after leaving the Regular Army, retiring from military service in 1970 as a lieutenant-colonel, commanding the Bermuda Regiment (a 1965 amalgam of the BVRC and BMA).

The Bermuda Government maintained both territorial units (the BMA being predominantly Black; the BVRC restricted to Whites) until 1965, when they were amalgamated into the Bermuda Regiment. Although trained in conventional light infantry tactics, the Bermuda Regiment has sought new roles to justify the expenditure required to maintain it, including readiness for Internal Security roles supporting the Bermuda Police Service, providing hurricane relief in Bermuda and other British territories, and taking an increasing hand in maritime patrol. It has also provided ceremonial parades previously mounted by regular soldiers.

== Post 1957 ==
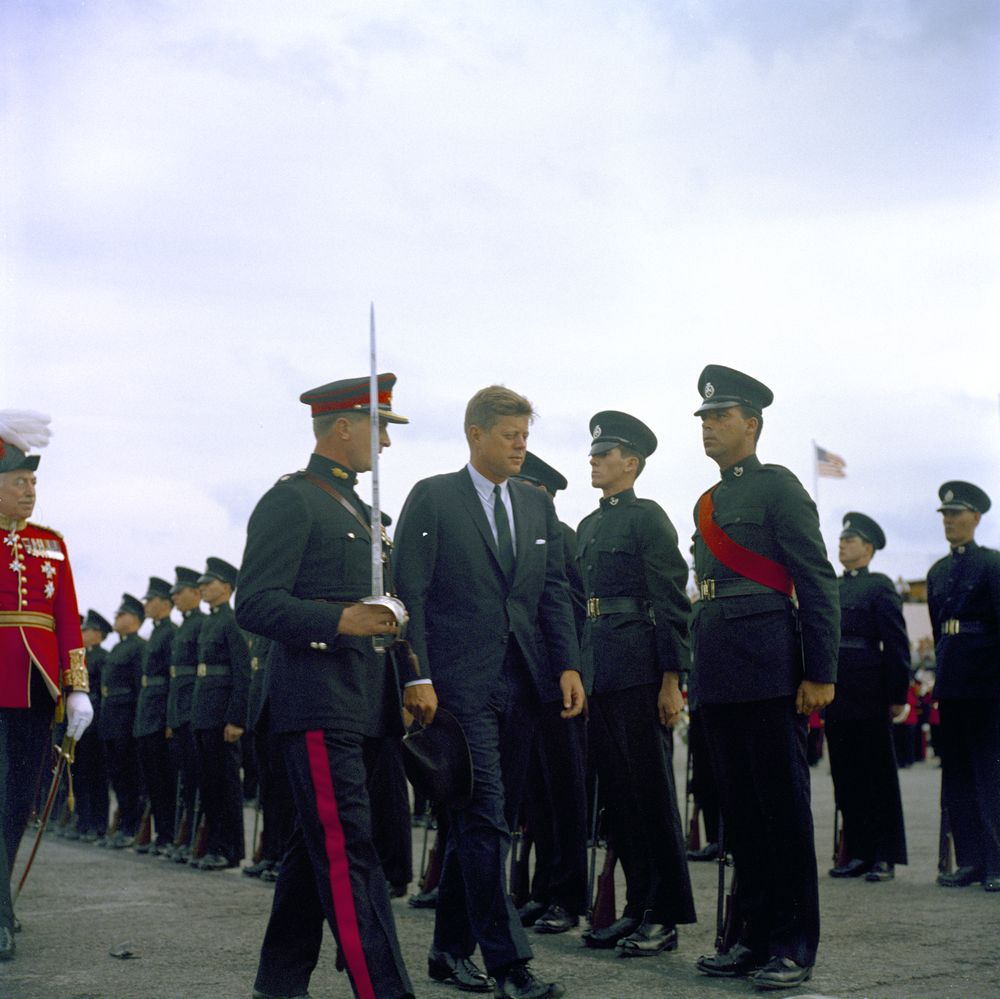
US President JF Kennedy and Major JA Marsh, DSO with bar, OBE (Officer Commanding the Bermuda Militia Artillery) inspect the BMA and Bermuda Rifles in 1961

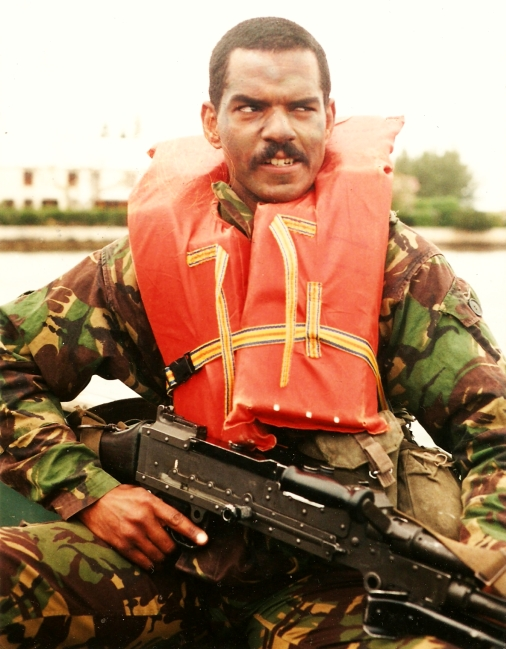
Royal Bermuda Regiment Corporal aboard a Dell Quay Dory Mk. 1 boat

Although no further regular units have been garrisoned in Bermuda since 1957, detachments have been sent to Bermuda occasionally for internal security, training, recreational, or ceremonial purposes, including elements of the airborne forces, which were on Bermuda for training exercises with the Bermuda Regiment when Governor Sir Richard Sharples and his ADC, Captain Hugh Sayers, were murdered on 10 March 1973. A state of emergency was declared, and the Bermuda Regiment and the airborne soldiers (as well as the Royal Marines detachment from the frigate HMS Sirius, serving as West Indies Guard Ship, and docked at HMS Malabar) were called in to assist the civil authorities. The 23 Parachute Field Ambulance, 1 Parachute Logistic Regiment and the band of the 1st Battalion, The Parachute Regiment subsequently provided protection for Government buildings and officials as well as assisting the Bermuda Police.

The 1st Battalion Royal Regiment of Fusiliers was briefly despatched to Bermuda at the request of the local government as a result of riots in 1977 (following the death sentences given to the two men responsible for the murders of the Governor and his ADC, as well as of the 1972 murder of Police Commissioner George Duckett and the 1973 murders of two staff members of a grocery store). At the time, the Bermuda Regiment numbered about 400 officers and men. While sufficient to guard key points around the island, this did not allow for a reserve of men in barracks, and the soldiers assigned to guard duty could not be rotated back to barracks for periods of rest. This shortfall was taken into account by Major-General Glyn Gilbert, the highest-ranking Bermudian in the British Army, when he issued a report on the Bermuda Regiment in which he made a number of recommendations, including its increase to a full battalion of about 750, with three rifle companies and a support company.

The Bermuda Regiment (now the Royal Bermuda Regiment) trained for the Internal Security role to support the police, but with threat of civil unrest fading over the following decades, it sought new roles, especially the response to hurricanes. Its expertise means it has been increasingly called on to provide similar relief in British Overseas Territories and Commonwealth countries in the West Indies which lack Bermuda's resources. Teams of volunteers have been flown to a series of islands since the 1980s by Royal Air Force transport, helping to fulfill the British Government's obligations to territories throughout that region.

== Military Establishment of Bermuda ==
Sixty of the Bermuda Garrison defence works, camps, depots and other sites
- North America Command
- Nova Scotia Command
  - St. George's Garrison (Eastern District Headquarters)
  - Convict Bay (transferred from Royal Navy 1866, becoming part of adjacent St. George's Garrison)
    - Ordnance Island
    - Royal Army Service Corps Wharf (St. George's)
    - St. George's Armoury
    - East Coast Forts (St. George's, Paget, Governor's, and St. David's Islands)
    - Fort St. Catherine's
    - Fort Victoria
    - Fort Albert
    - Western Redoubt
    - Fort George
    - Town Cut Battery (or Gates' Fort)
    - Alexandra Battery
    - Fort Cunningham
    - Fort Popple
    - Paget Fort
    - Smith's Fort
    - Peniston's Redoubt
    - St. David's Battery
    - Castle Islands Fortifications
      - Devonshire Redoubt
      - Landward Fort
      - Queen's Castle (King's Castle, The Castle, Seaward Fort)
      - Southampton Fort
      - Martello Tower
      - Burnt Point Fort
      - Ferry Island Fort
  - Prospect Camp (Command Headquarters and Central District Headquarters)
    - Warwick Camp
    - Agar's Island
    - Royal Army Service Corps Wharf (Hamilton)
    - Hamilton Armoury
    - Prospect Hill Position
      - Fort Prospect
      - Fort Langton
      - Fort Hamilton
    - South Shore Batteries (former fixed batteries adapted for field guns)
      - Fort Bruere
      - Bailey's Bay Battery (Tucker's Town Battery, and Tucker's Town Bay Fort)
      - Newton's Bay Fort (Hall's Bay Fort)
      - Albouy's Fort
      - Harris' Bay Fort
      - Sears' Fort
      - Devonshire Bay Fort
      - Hungry Bay Fort
      - Crow Lane Fort (also known as New Paget's Fort and East Elbow Bay Fort)
      - Middleton's Bay Fort (also known as Centre Bay Fort)
      - West Elbow Bay Fort
      - Warwick Camp Battery
      - Warwick Fort
      - Jobson's Cove Fort
      - Great Turtle Bay Battery
      - Jobson's Fort
      - Hunt's Fort (Lighthouse Fort)
      - Ingham's Fort
      - Church Bay Fort East
      - Church Bay Fort West
  - Boaz Island and Watford Island (Clarence Barracks; Western District Headquarters)
    - Somerset Armoury
    - Whale Bay Battery (West Whale Bay)
    - Whale Bay Fort (West Whale Bay)
    - West Side Fort
    - Wreck Hill Fort
    - Scaur Hill Fort
    - Daniel's Island Fort
    - Mangrove Bay Fort
    - King's Point Redoubt
    - Maria's Hill Fort
- Bermuda Militia. 1612–1815.
- Bermudian Militia, Volunteer and Territorial Army Units, 1895–1965
- Bermuda Militia Artillery
- Bermuda Volunteer Rifle Corps
- Bermuda Volunteer Engineers
- Bermuda Militia Infantry
- Royal Bermuda Regiment
- Bermuda Home Guard
- Bermuda Cadet Corps

== Gallery ==
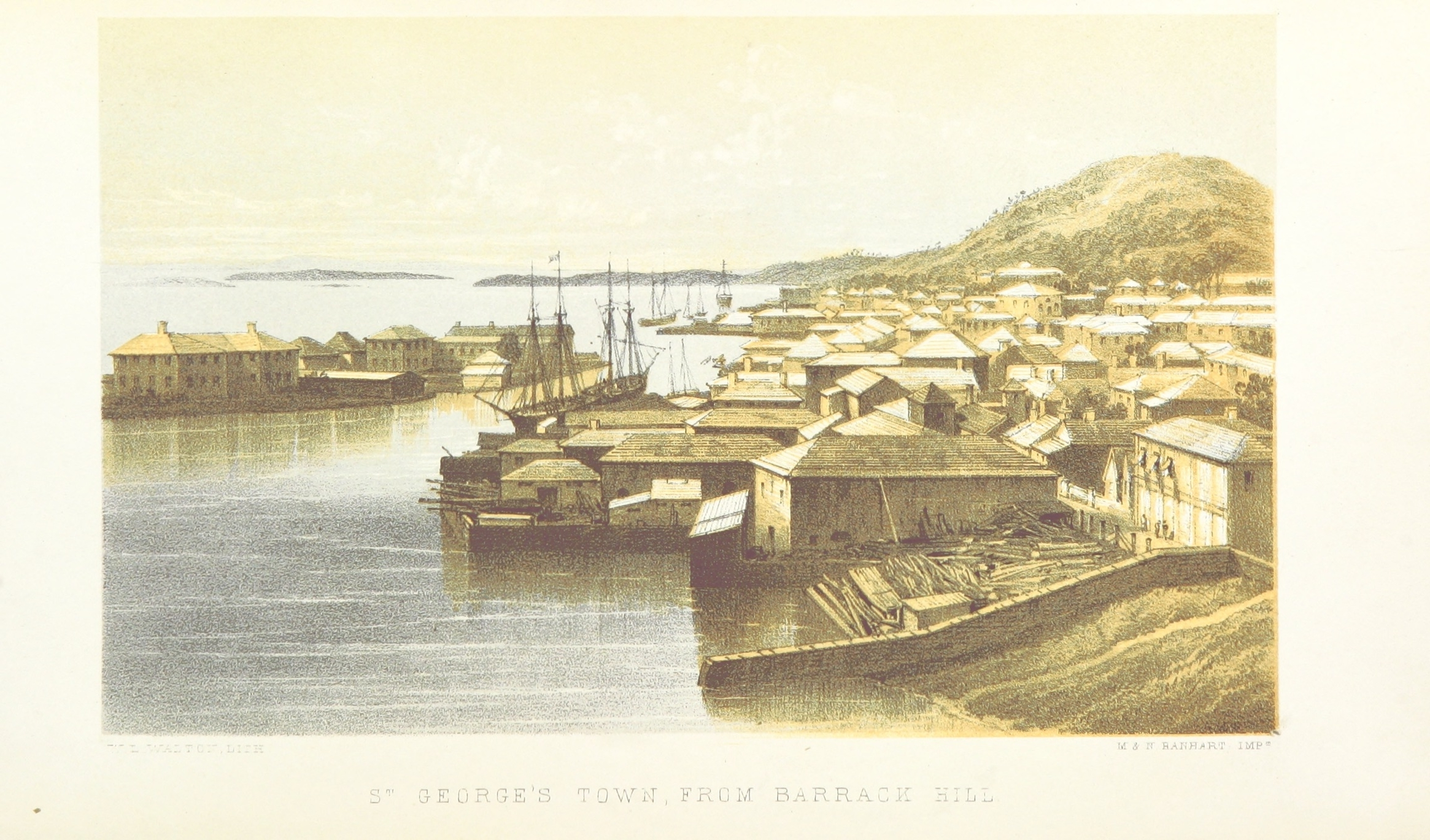
Ordnance Island (left) and St. George's Town as seen from Barrack Hill in 1857

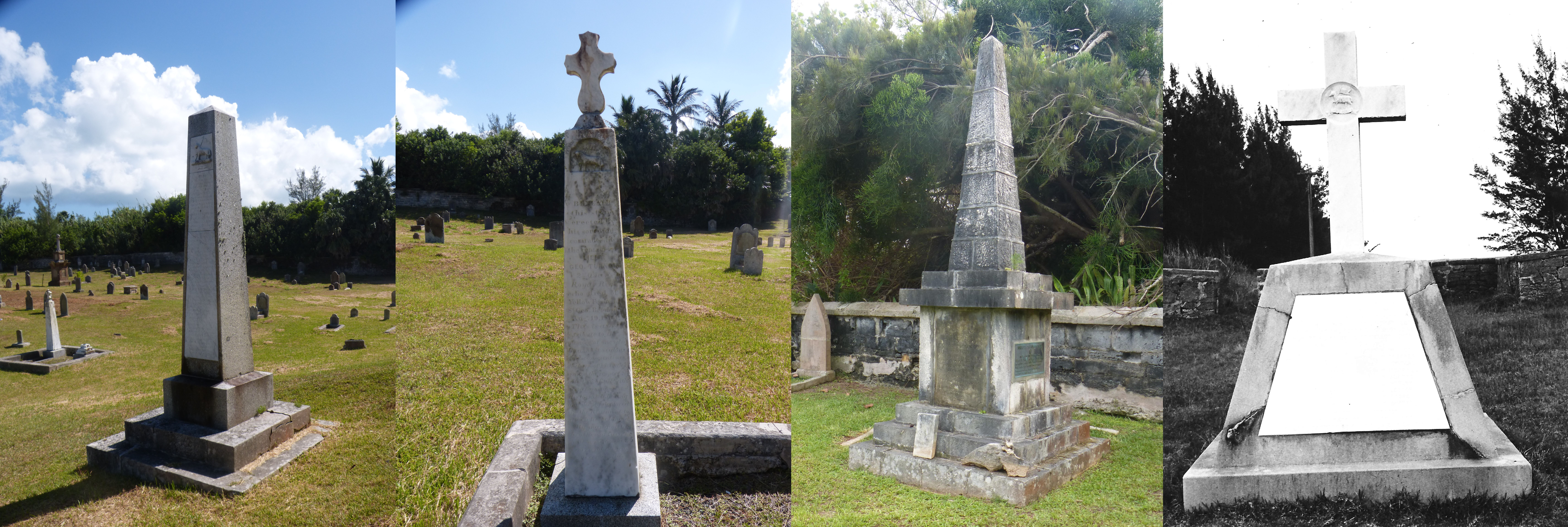
1864-1866 2nd Bn, 2nd Queen's Regiment memorials in Bermuda

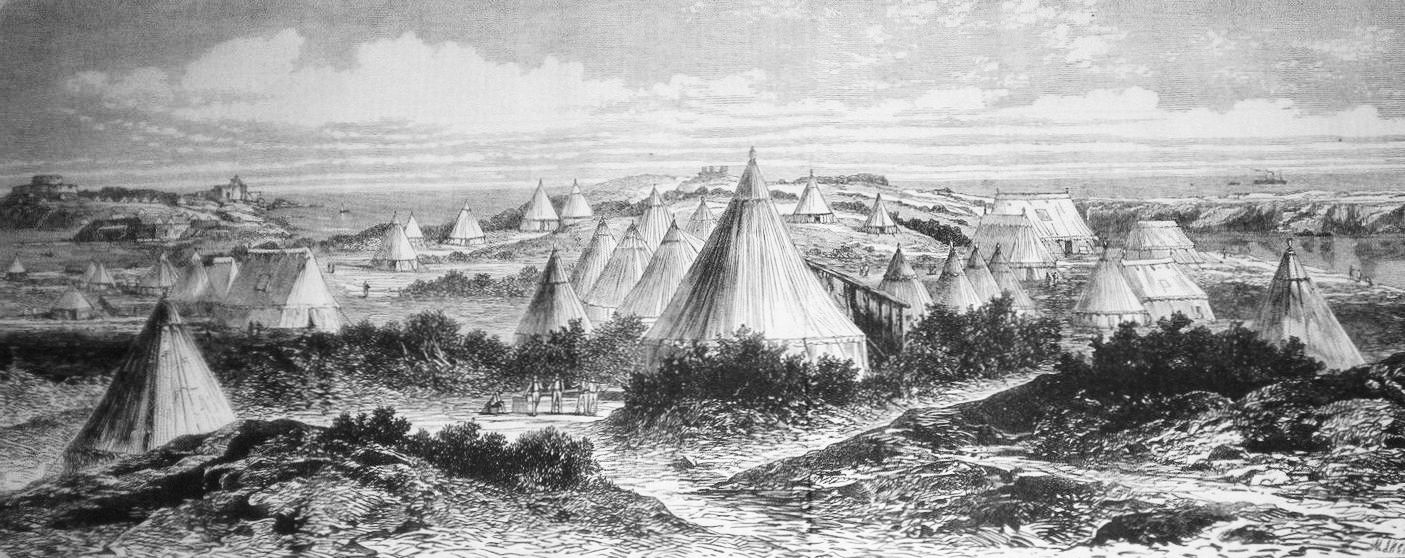
Royal Artillery and Royal Engineers camp at Tucker's Town, St. George's Parish, Bermuda in 1867

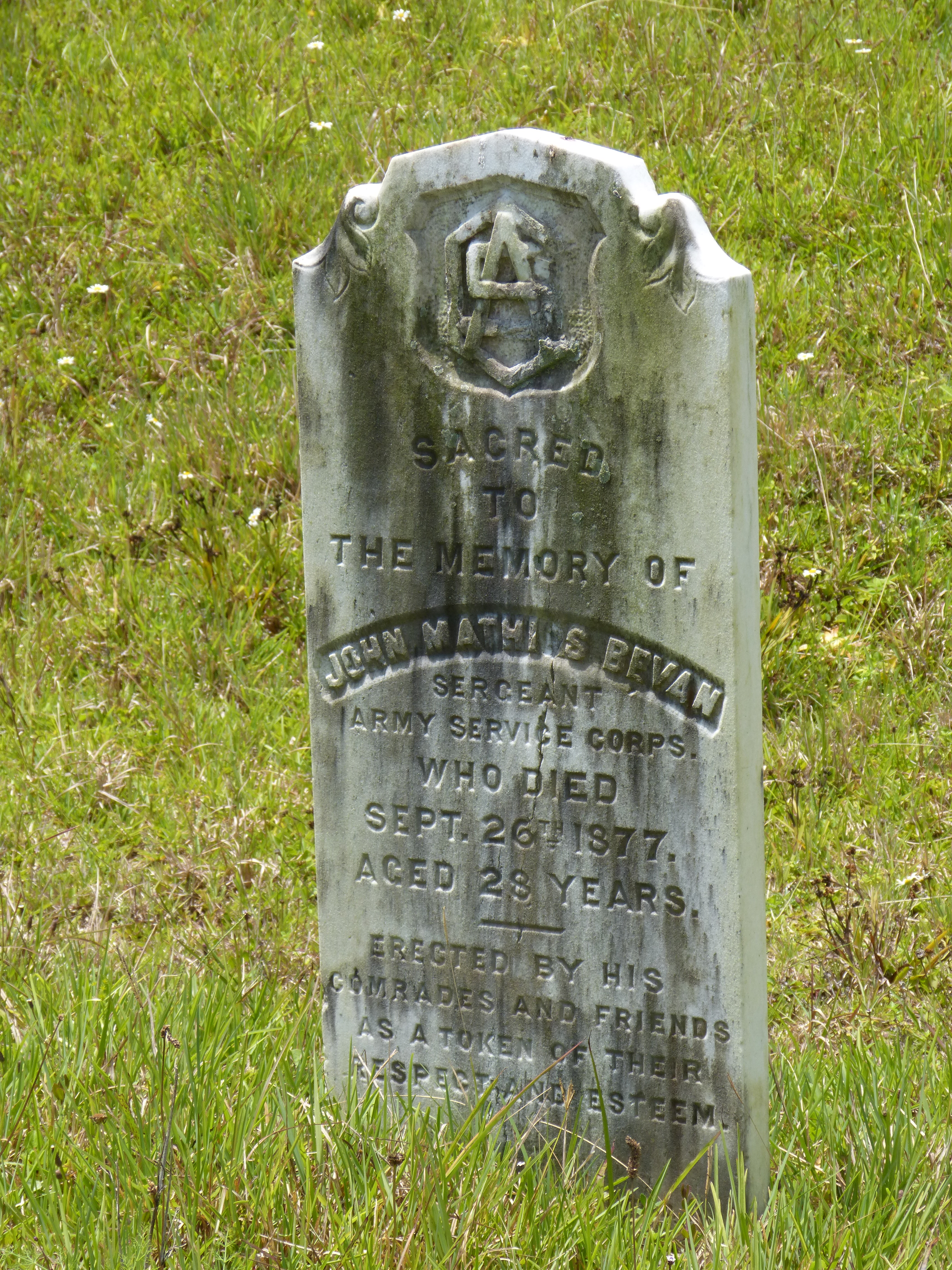
1877 gravestone of Sergeant John Matthias Bevan, ASC, in the new cemetery of St. George's Garrison.

46th (South Devonshire) Regiment of Foot (1876–1879) & 2nd Battalion Duke of Cornwall's Light Infantry (1907–1910) graves in Bermuda

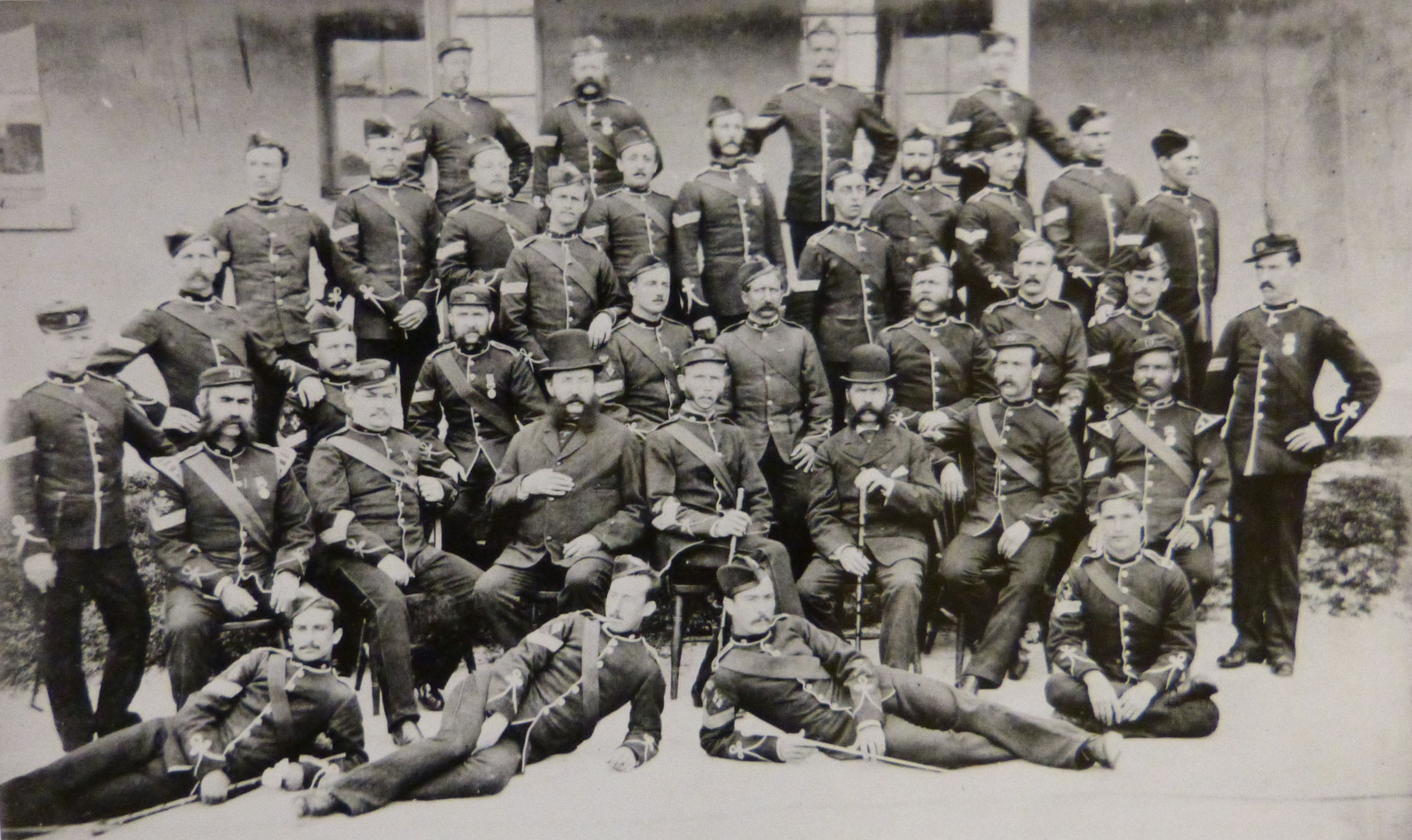
1st Battalion, 19th (1st Yorkshire North Riding – Princess of Wales's Own) Regiment of Foot Warrant Officers and Non-Commissioned Officers in Bermuda circa 1879–1880

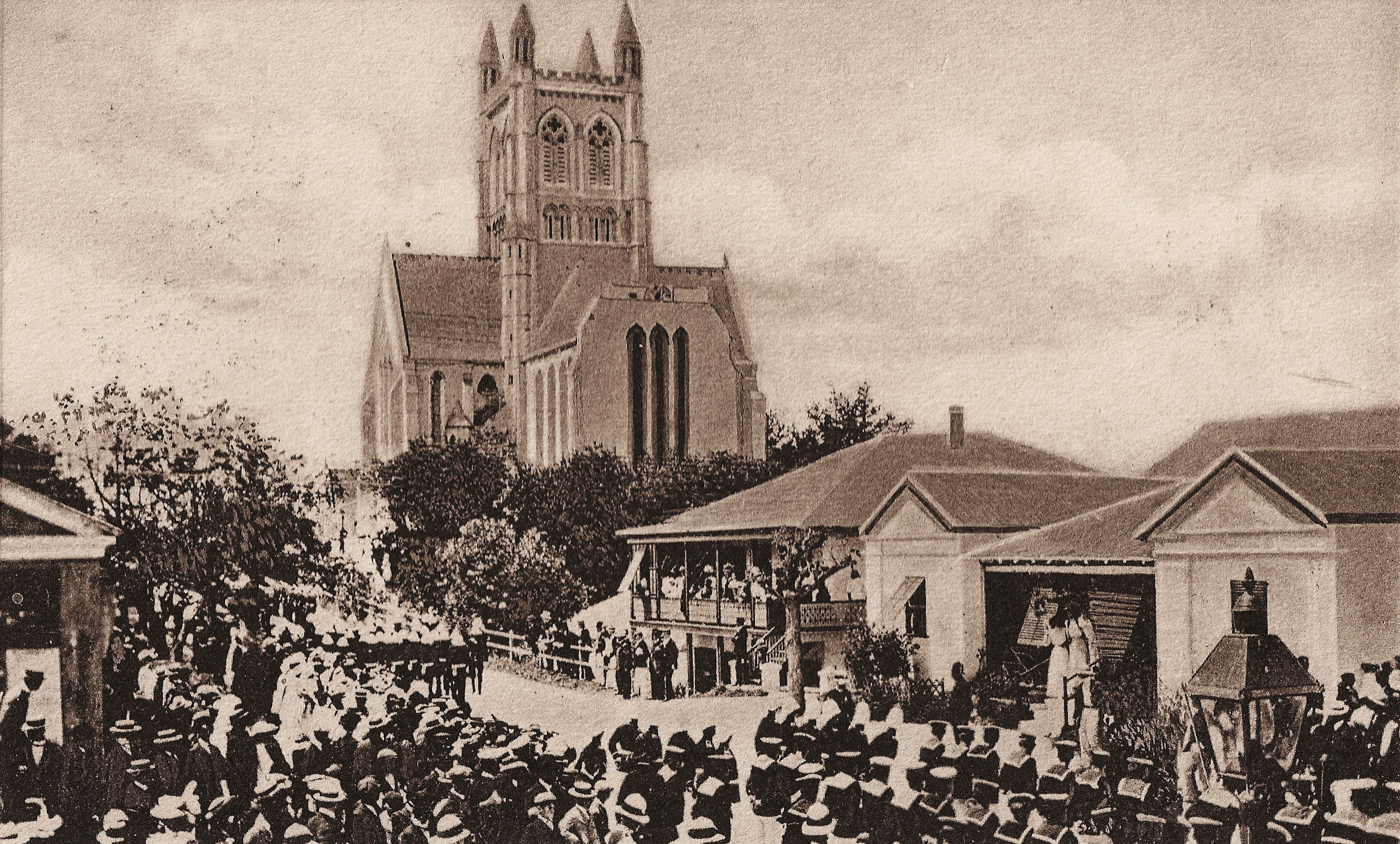
Royal Navy and British Army Church Parade at the (then under construction) Cathedral in the City of Hamilton, circa 1900

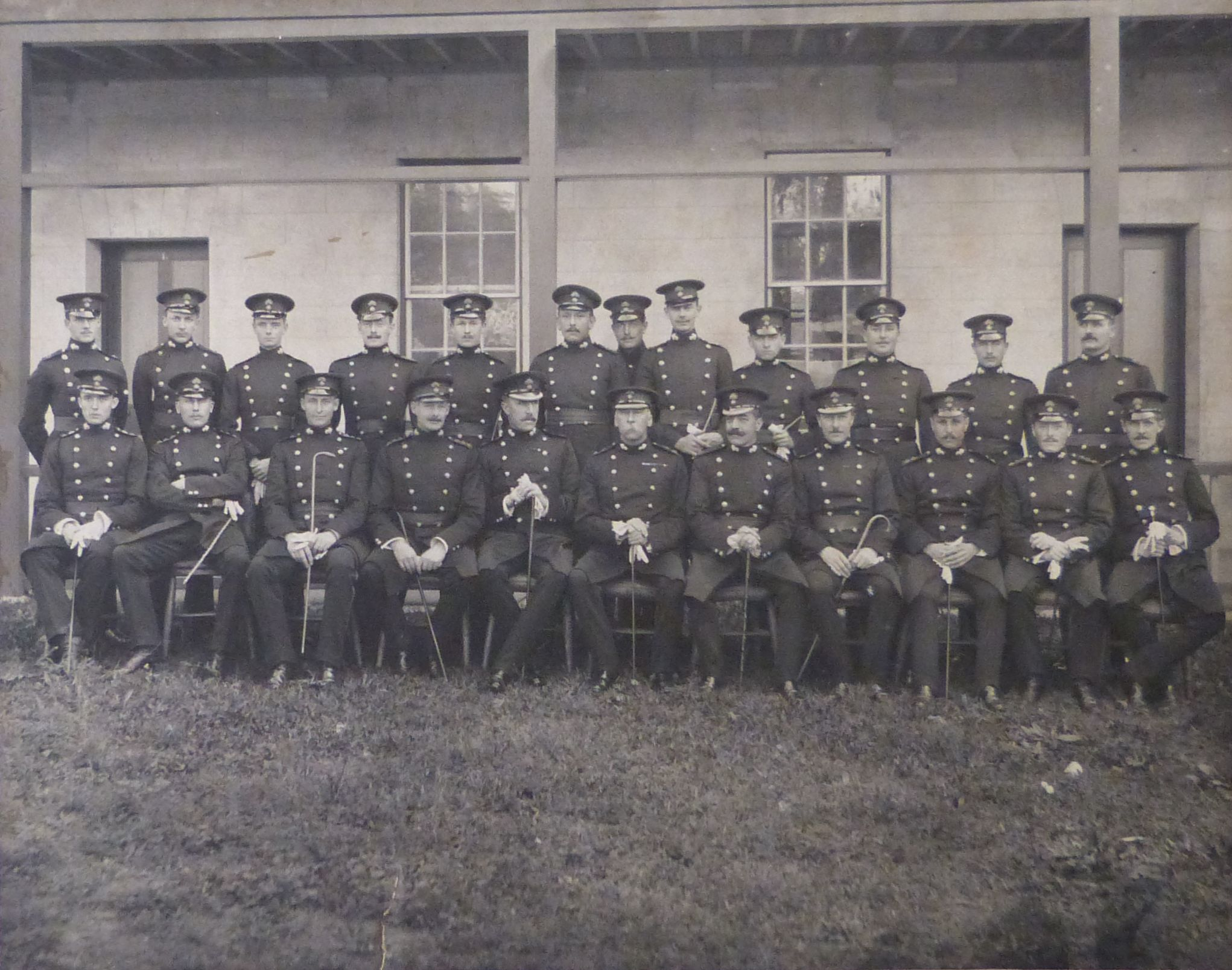
Lieutenant-Colonel Richard Boileau Gaisford, CMG (Commanding Officer) and other officers of the 3rd Battalion, The Royal Fusiliers (City of London Regiment), in Bermuda in 1905

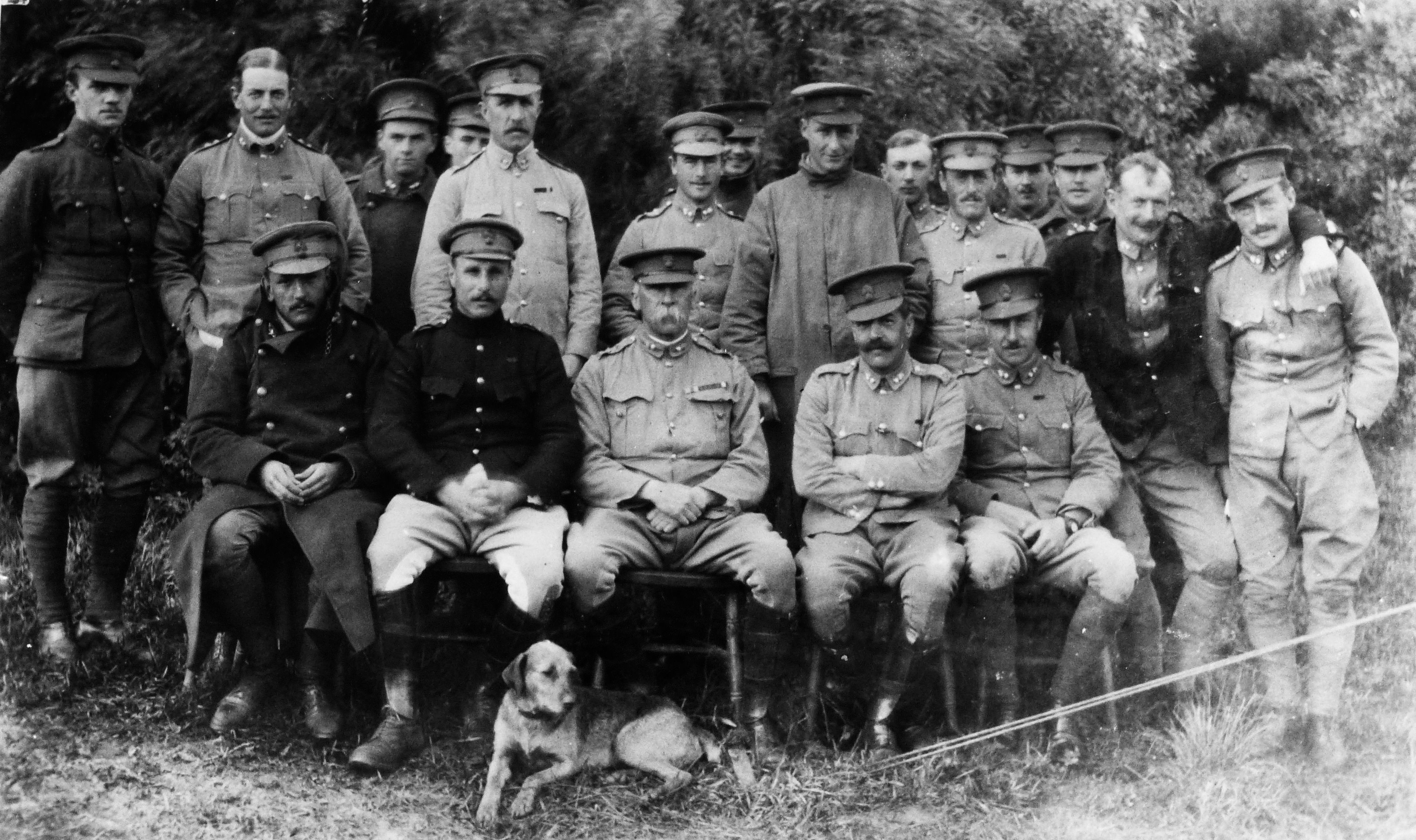
Lieutenant-Colonel Richard Boileau Gaisford, CMG (Commanding Officer) and other officers of the 3rd Battalion, The Royal Fusiliers (City of London Regiment), at Battalion Training at Tucker's Town, Bermuda, 23rd to 28 January 1905

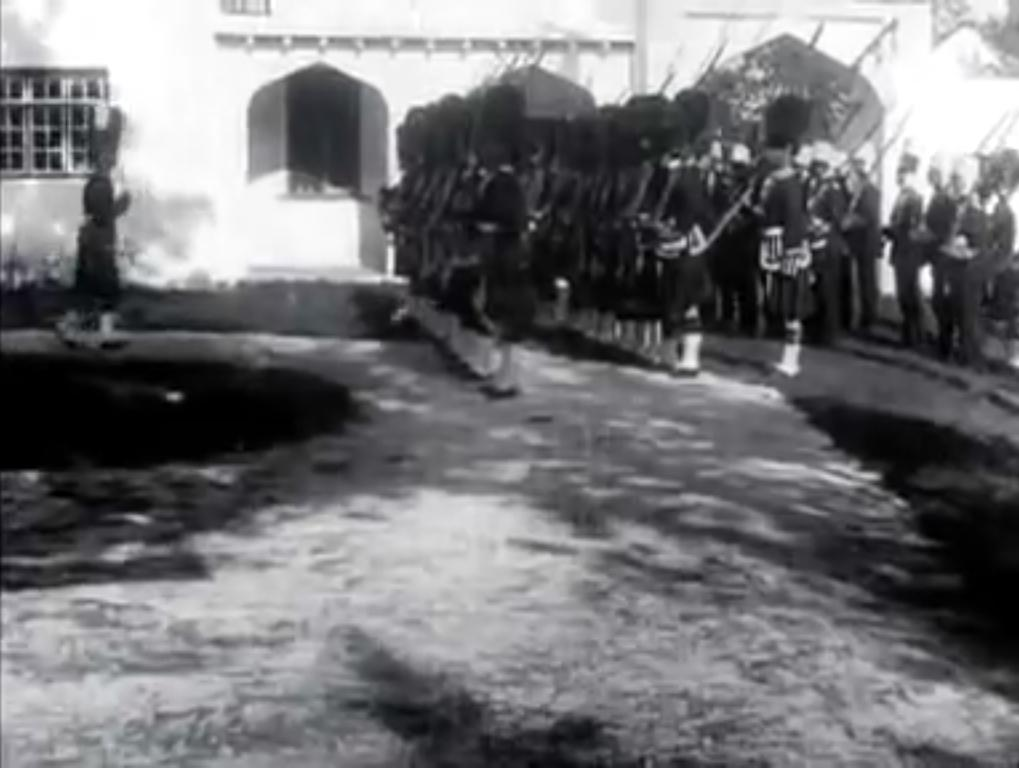
Soldiers from the 2nd Battalion, The Queen's (Royal West Surrey) Regiment, based in Bermuda, playing the role of Scottish Highland infantry in the 1912 film "The Relief of Lucknow" (at Walsingham House, today housing the "Tom Moore's Restaurant")

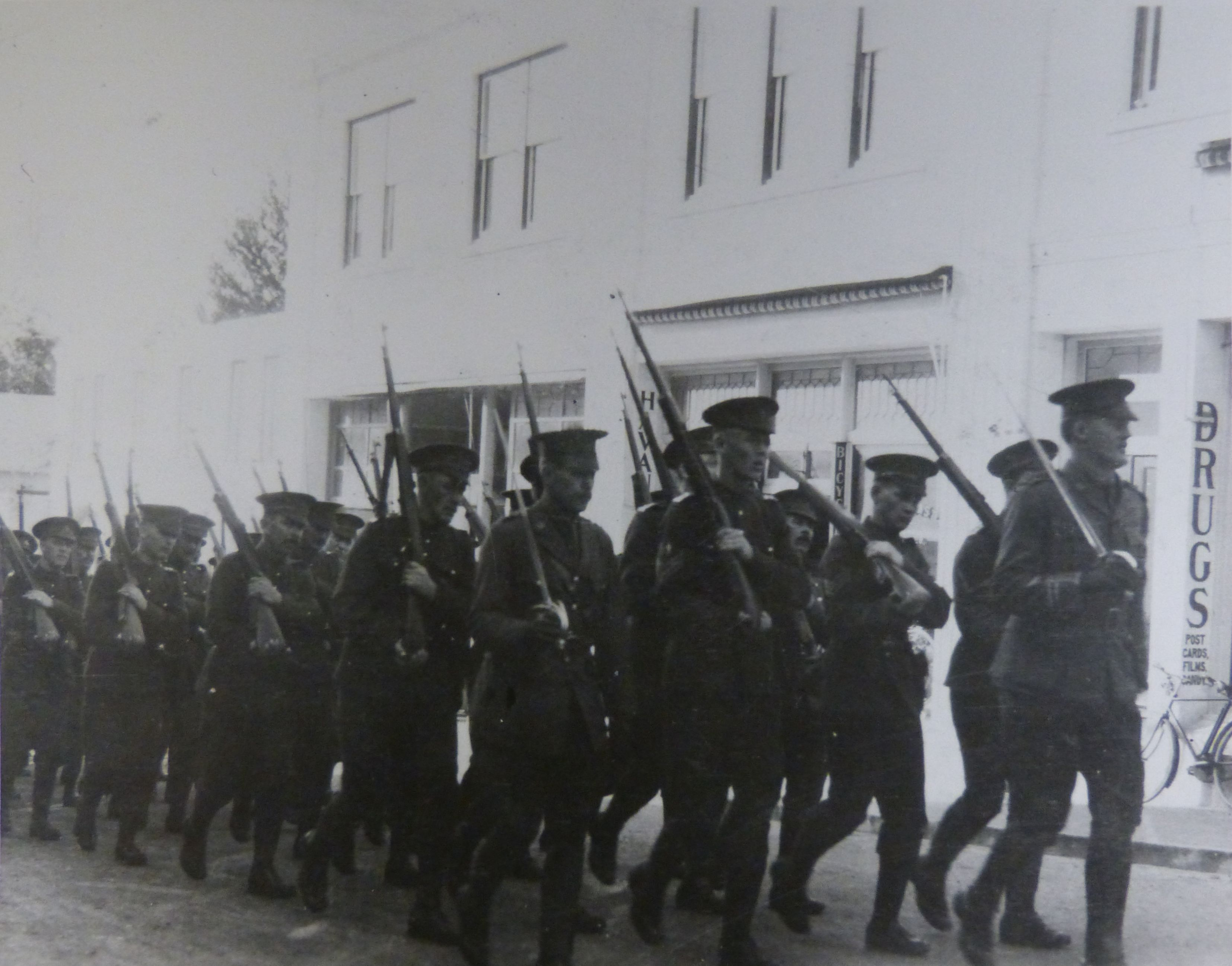
38th Battalion (Ottawa), CEF on Queen Street, City of Hamilton, Bermuda in 1915

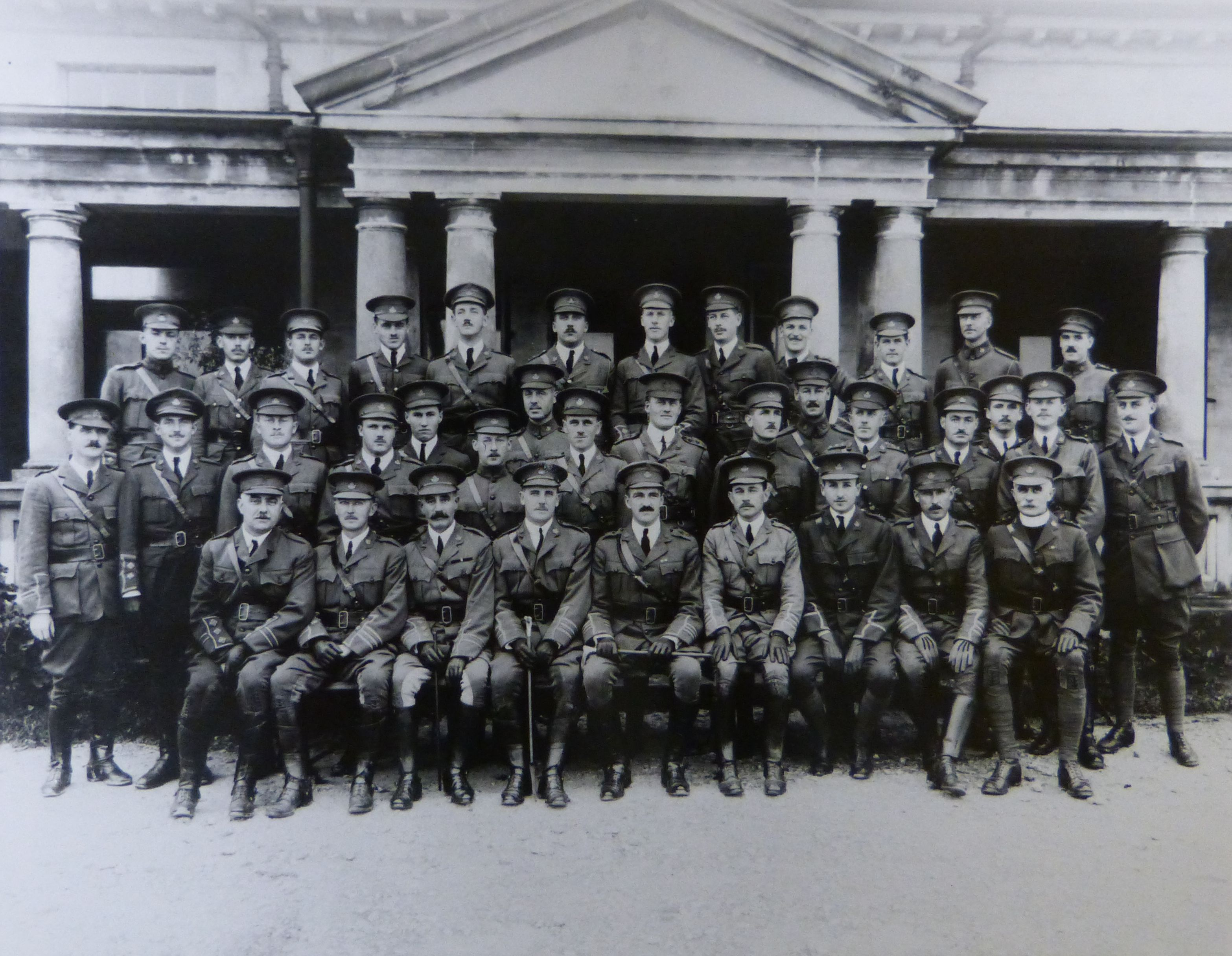
Officers of the 38th Battalion (Ottawa), CEF in Bermuda in 1915

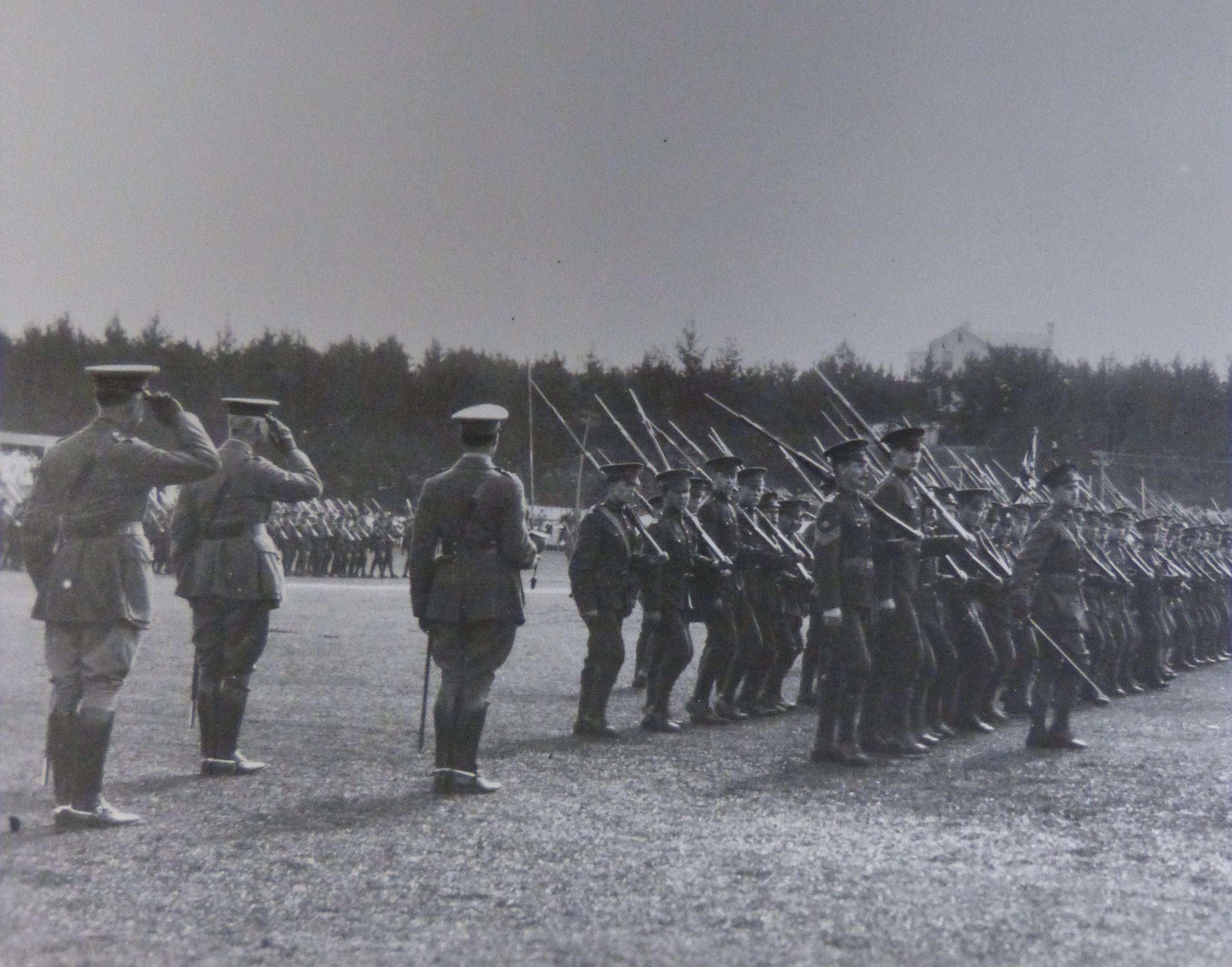
38th Battalion, CEF parade on a field in Bermuda, 1915

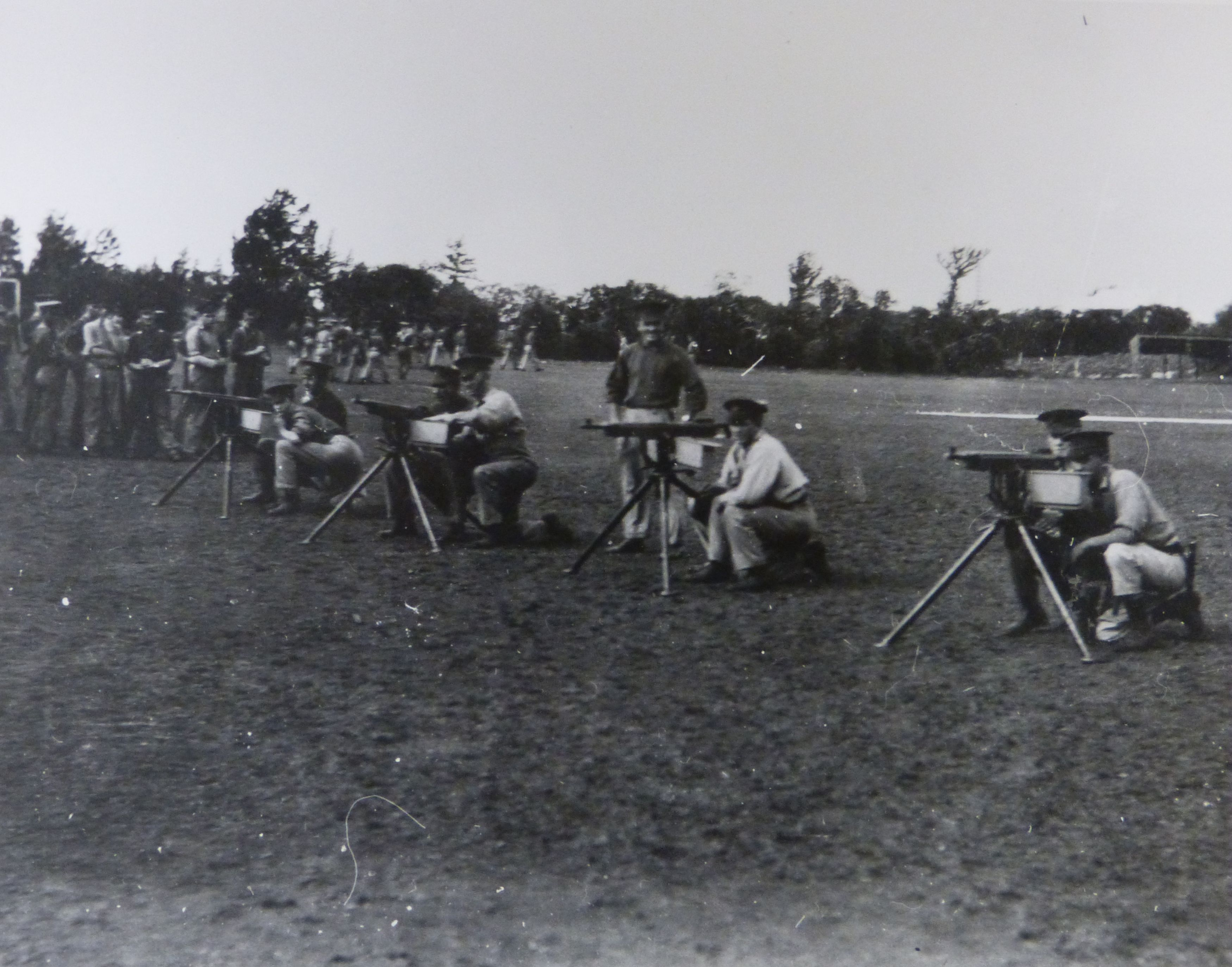
38th Battalion (Ottawa), CEF, with M1895 Colt–Browning machine guns at Prospect Camp in 1915

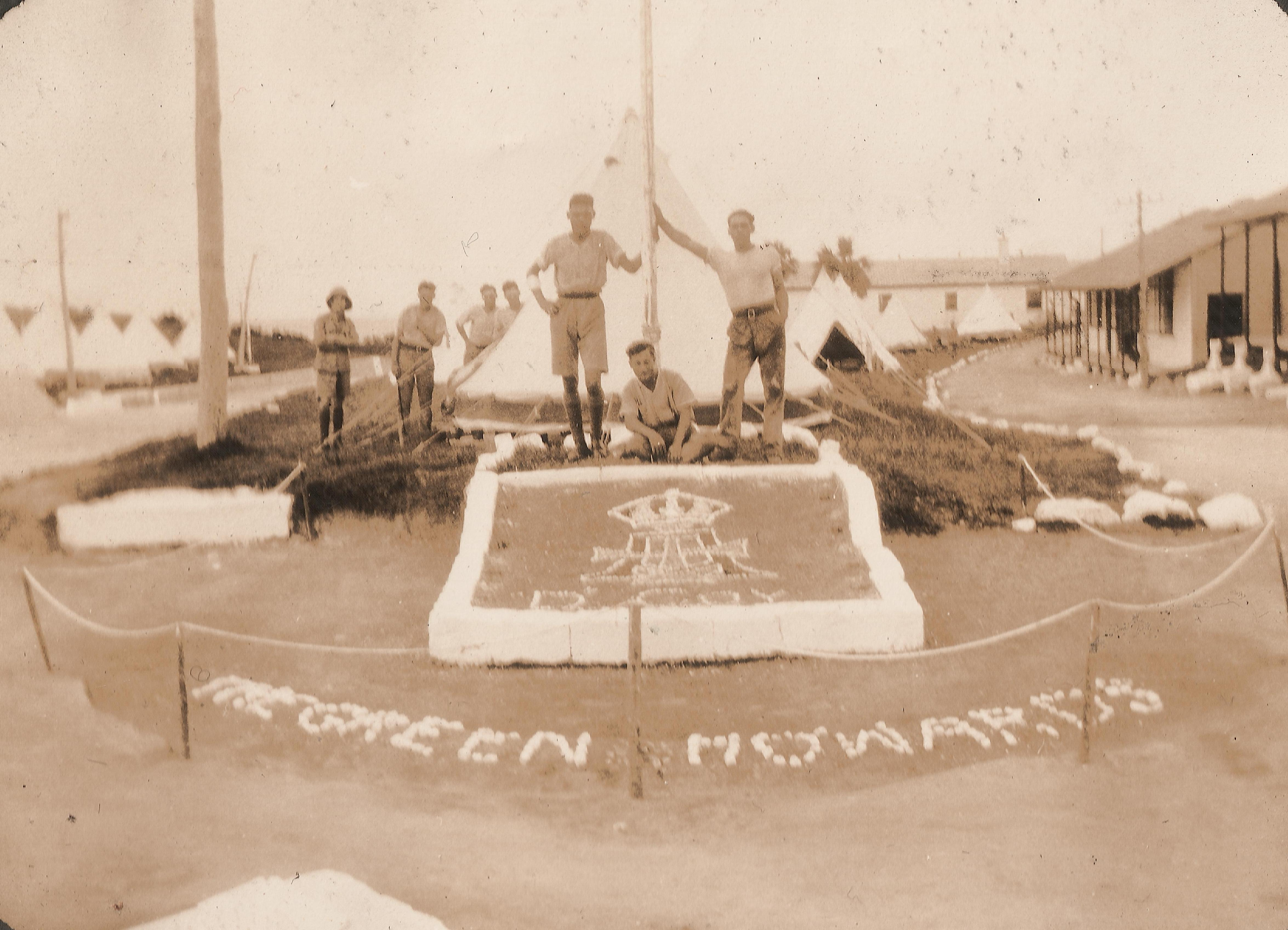
2 Battalion, Green Howards (Alexandra, Princess of Wales's Own Yorkshire Regiment) at Warwick Camp, Bermuda, circa 1925-1927

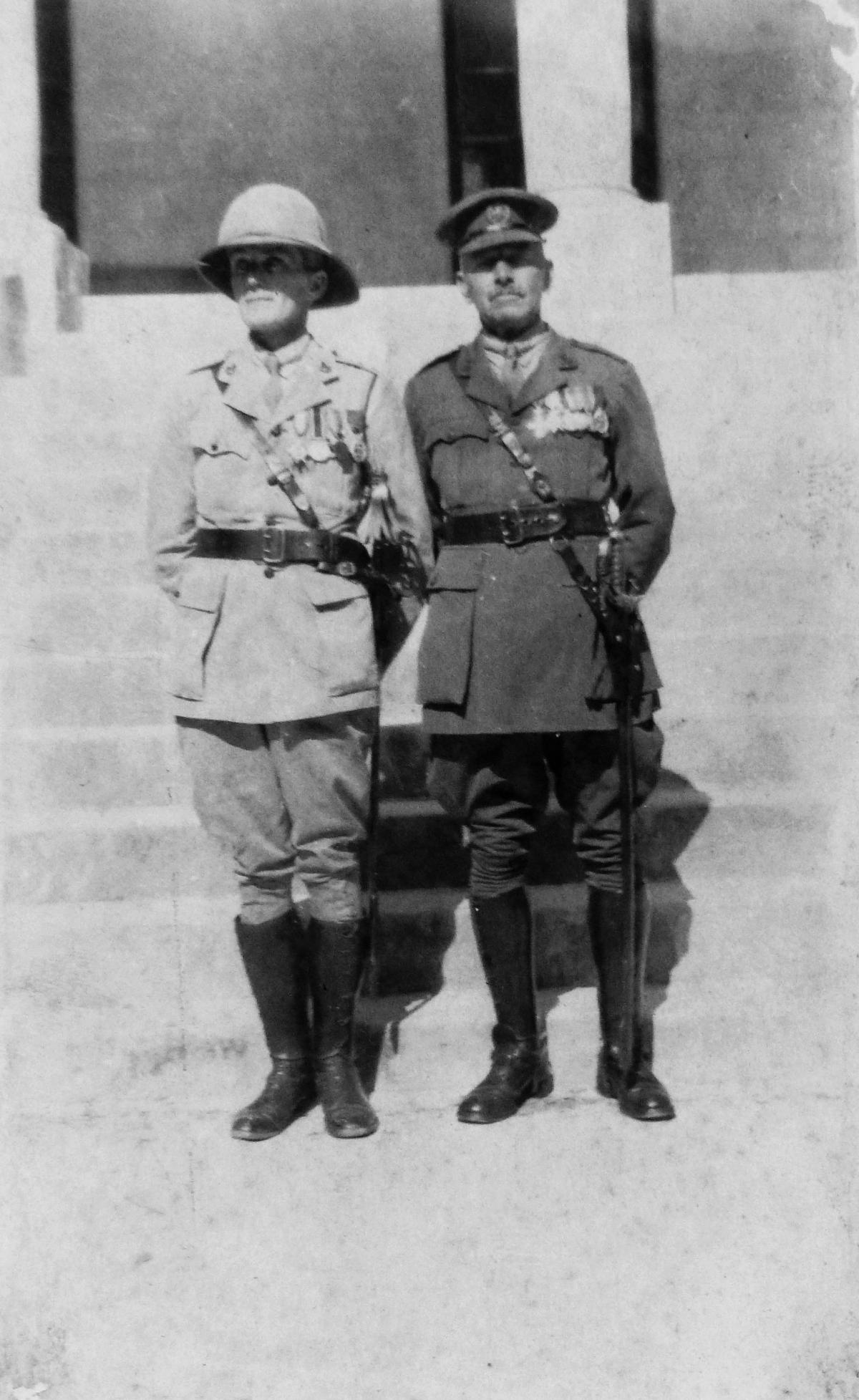
Major RC Earl and Lieutenant-Colonel RJ Tucker, BVRC, on Armistice Day, 1930

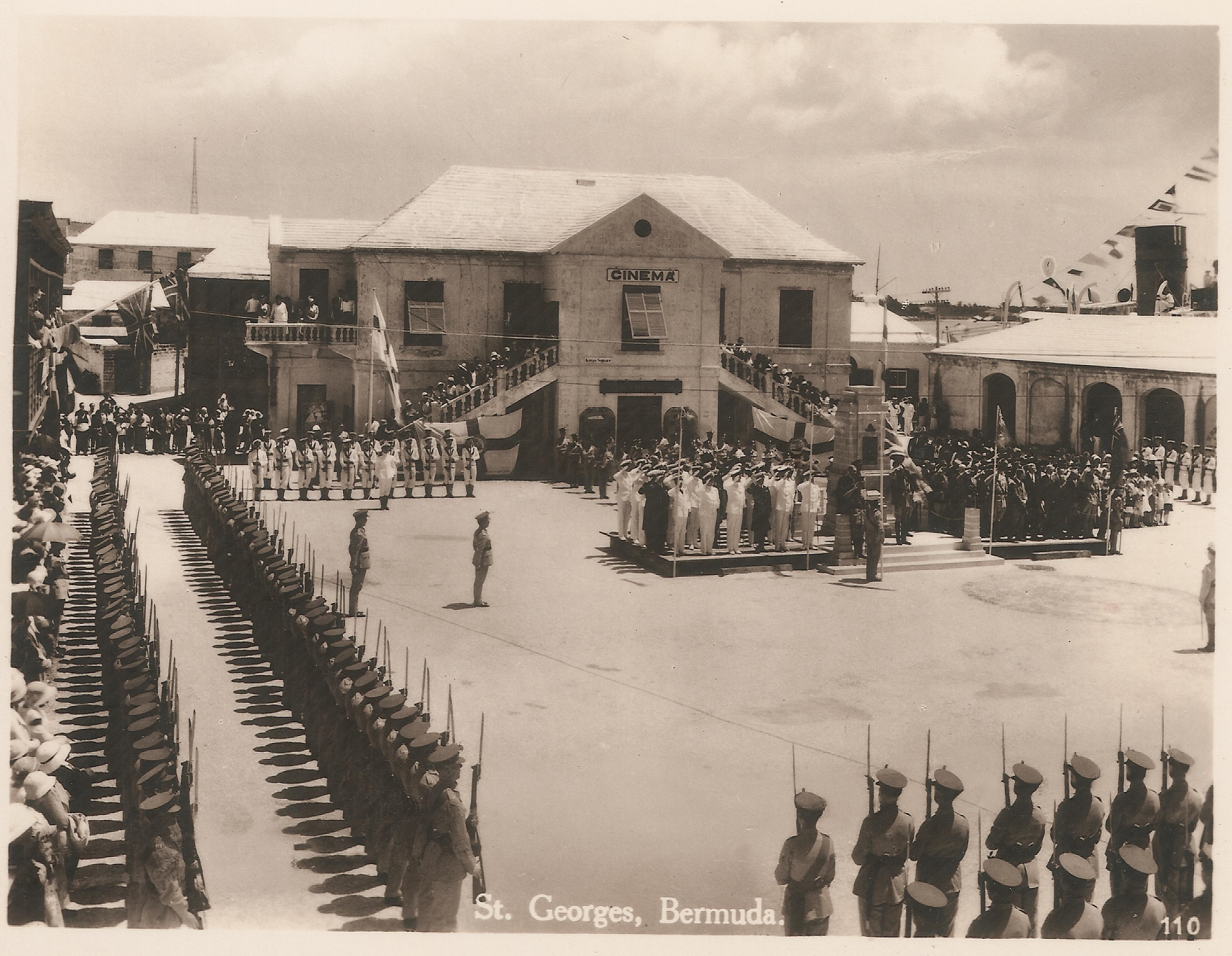
Naval and military parade in King's Square, St. George's Town, in the 1930s

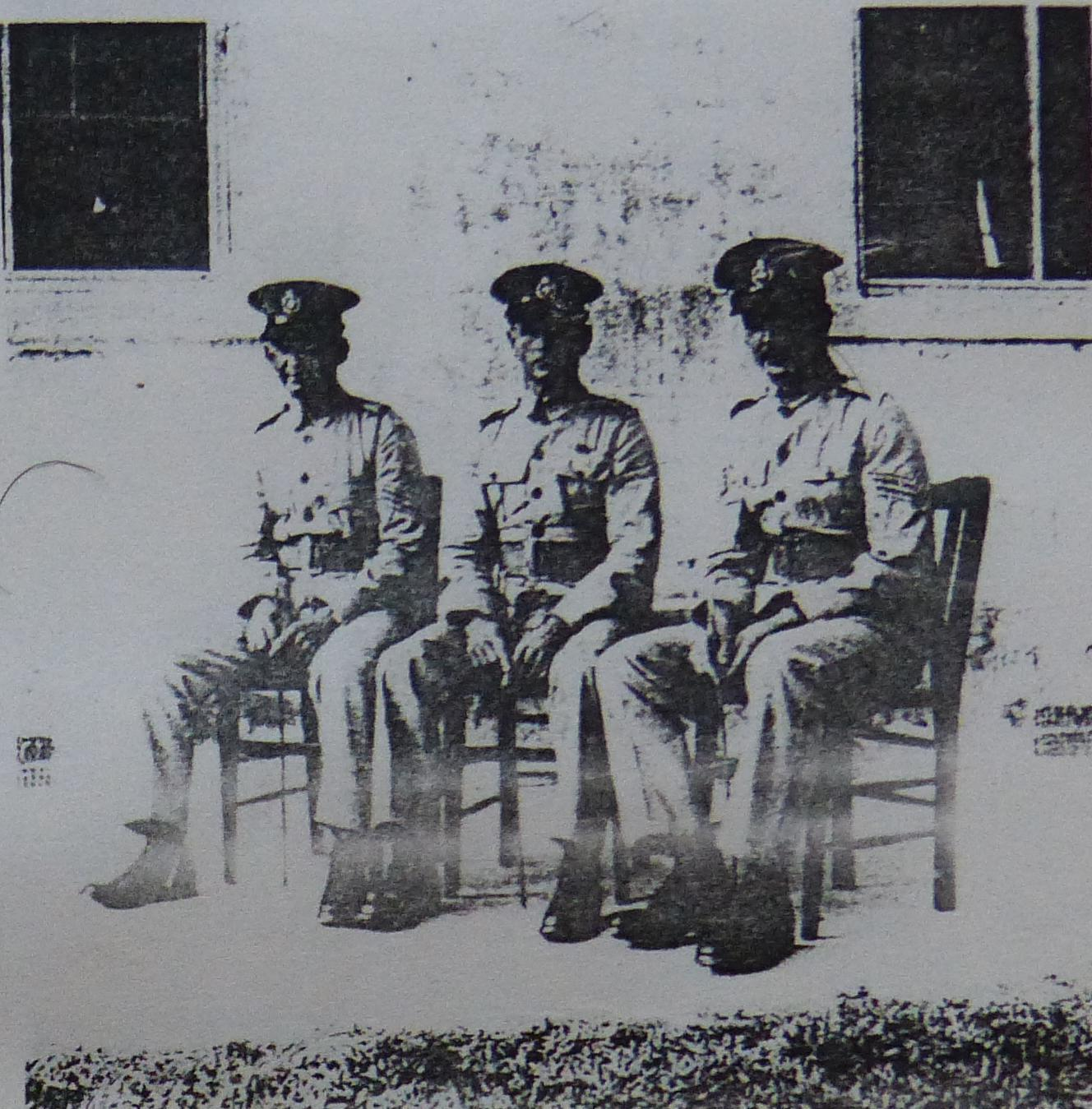
Three senior Other ranks of the Bermuda Volunteer Rifle Corps at the Royal Naval Dockyard circa 1940, including 683 Sergeant Edward A. Lee (right), later a CSM of the Caribbean Regiment.

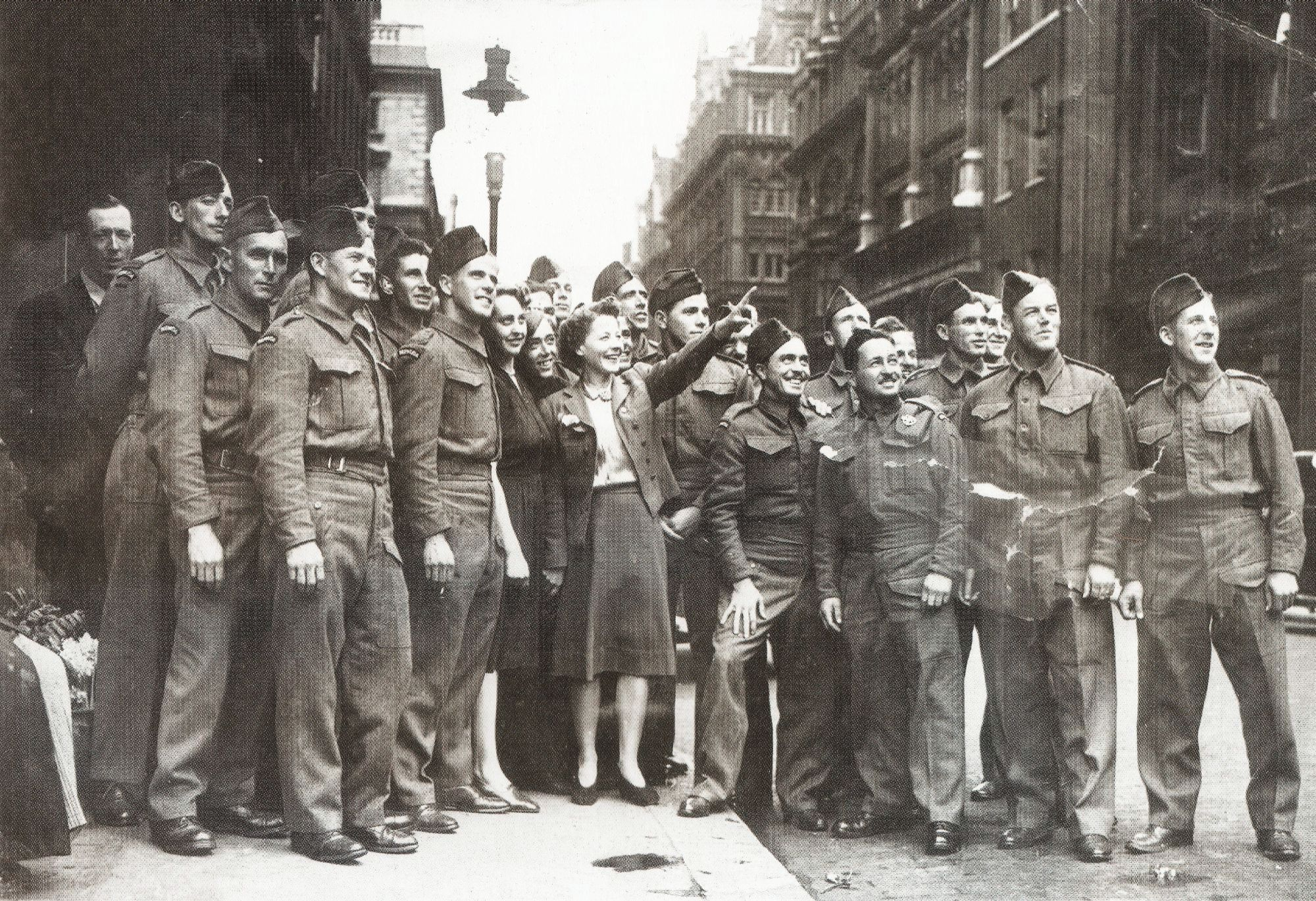
BVRC soldiers serving with the Lincolnshire Regiment, circa May, 1944

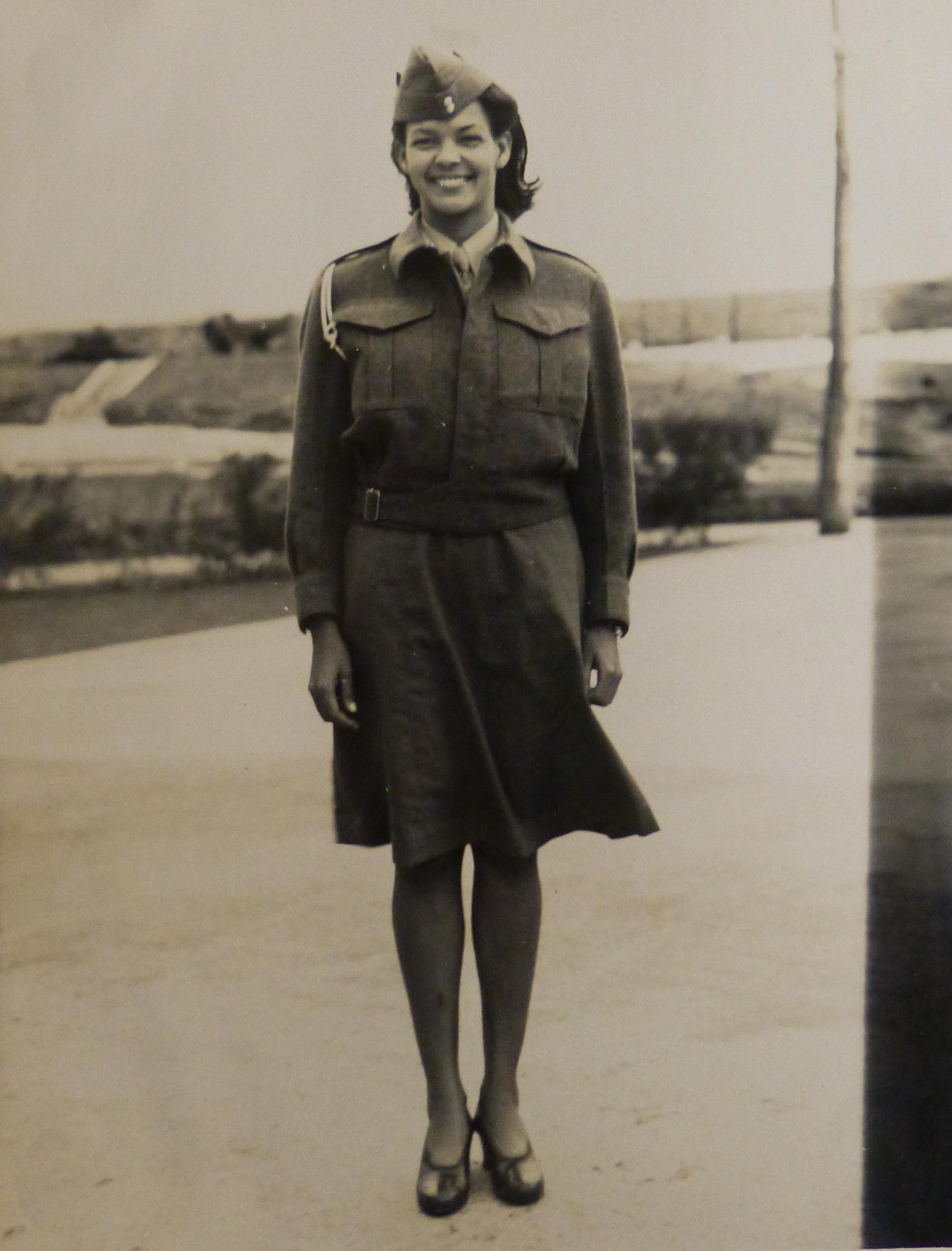
Bermuda Militia Artillery Clerk June Reid at St. David's Battery circa 1944

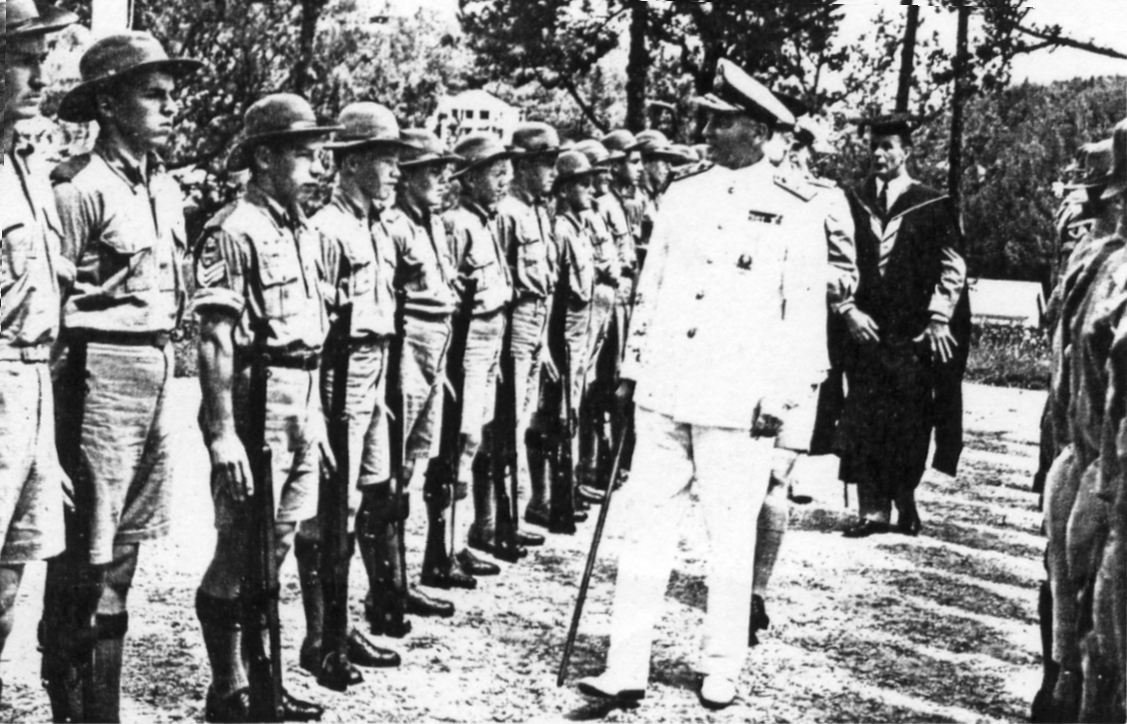
Bermuda Cadet Corps in the Second World War

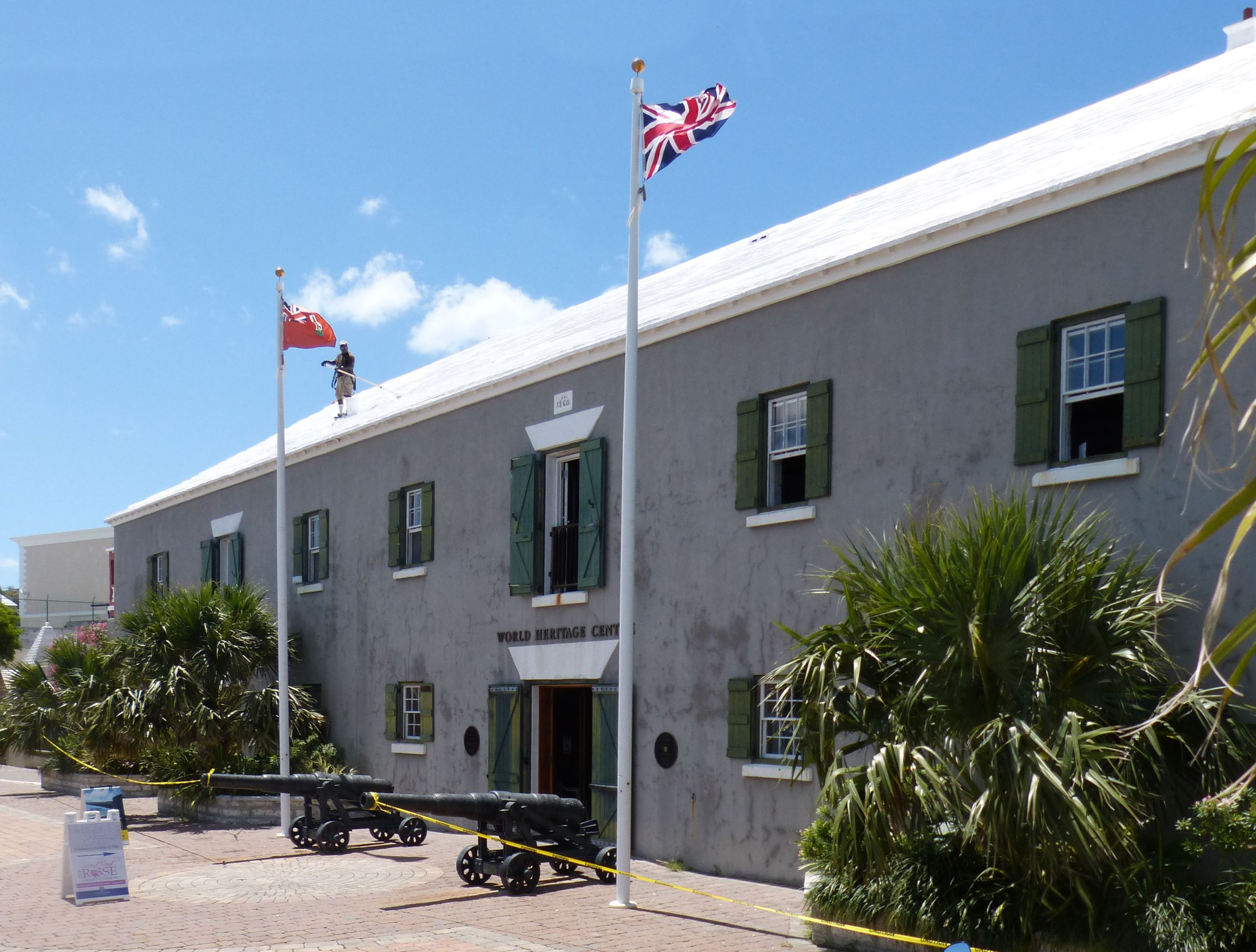
Two RBL 40-pounder Armstrong guns displayed at St. George's Foundation's UNESCO World Heritage Centre (a former Ordnance Stores warehouse), St. George's Town,. Originally used as mobile guns for defending areas of Bermuda's South Shore without fixed coastal artillery, they were soon replaced and became part of a saluting battery at Fort Victoria before being set into a wharf as bollards

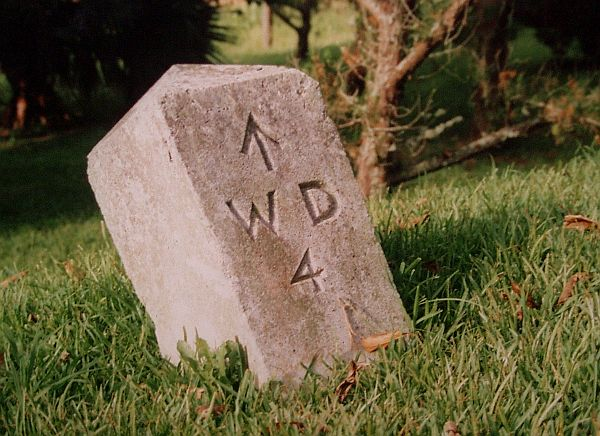
War Department Ordnance Survey Marker, Bermuda.

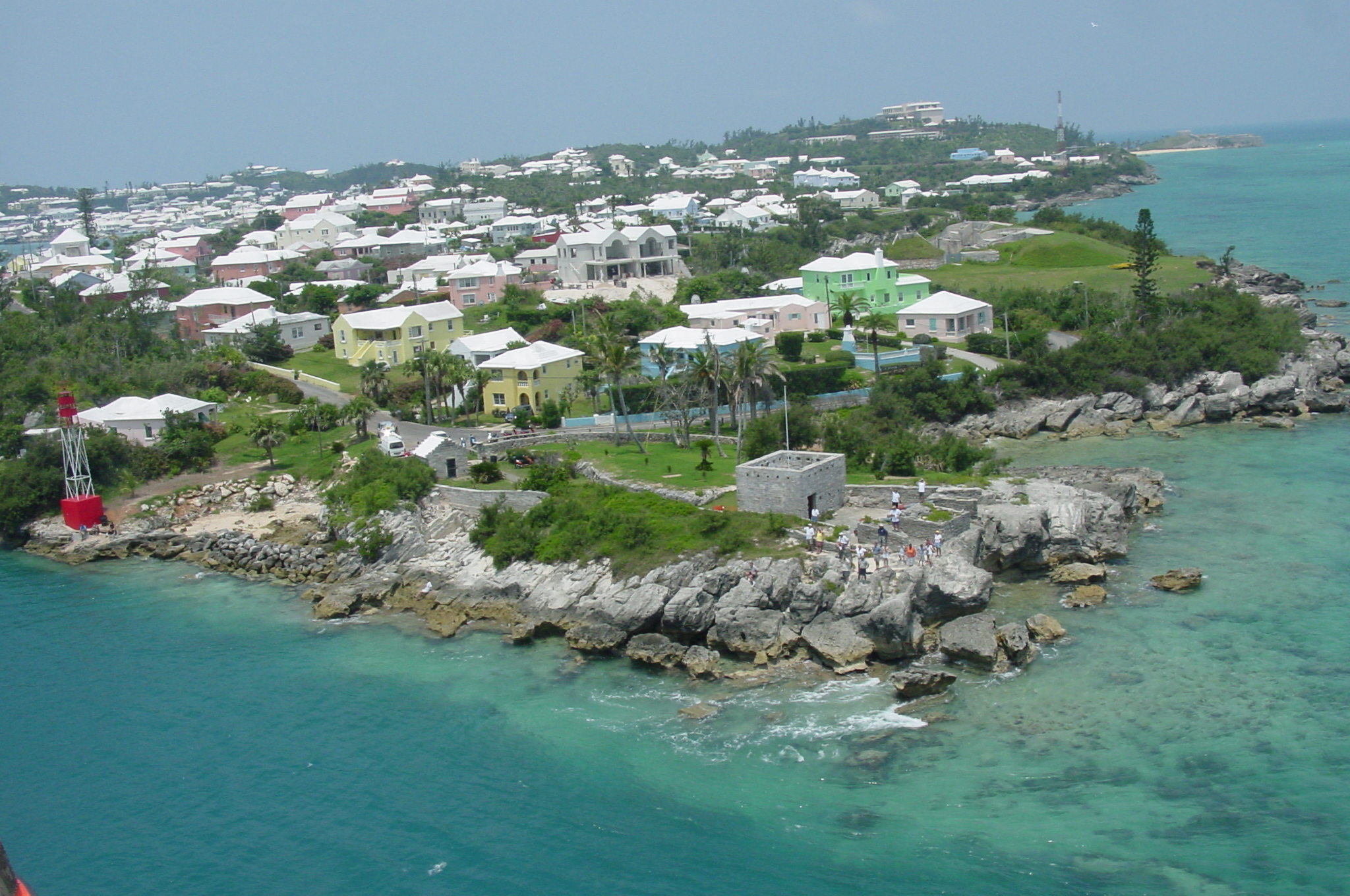
Cut Battery, with Alexandra Battery, Fort St' Catherine's, and Retreat Hill (with Fort Victoria and Fort Albert) visible

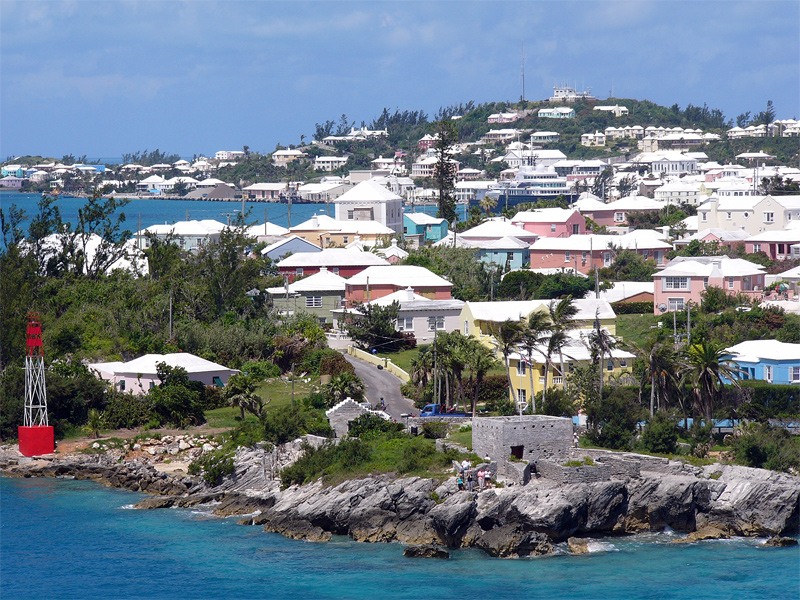
Cut Battery, with Fort George in view

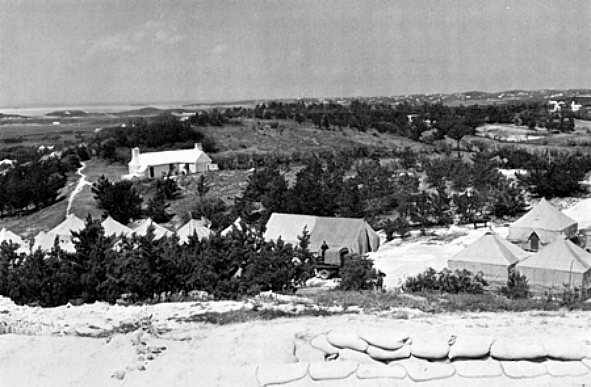
US Army camp at Ackermann's Hill (or Turtle Hill) within Warwick Camp, Southampton, Bermuda in World War II

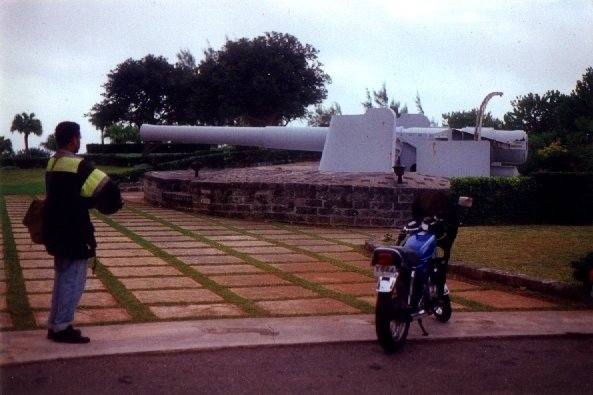
BL 9.2 inch gun Mk X at Fort Victoria on St. George's Island.

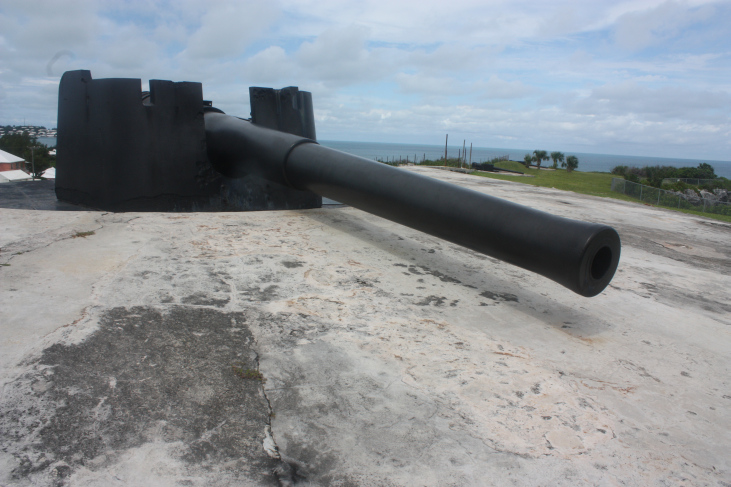
St. David's Battery (or the Examination Battery), St. David's, Bermuda in 2011

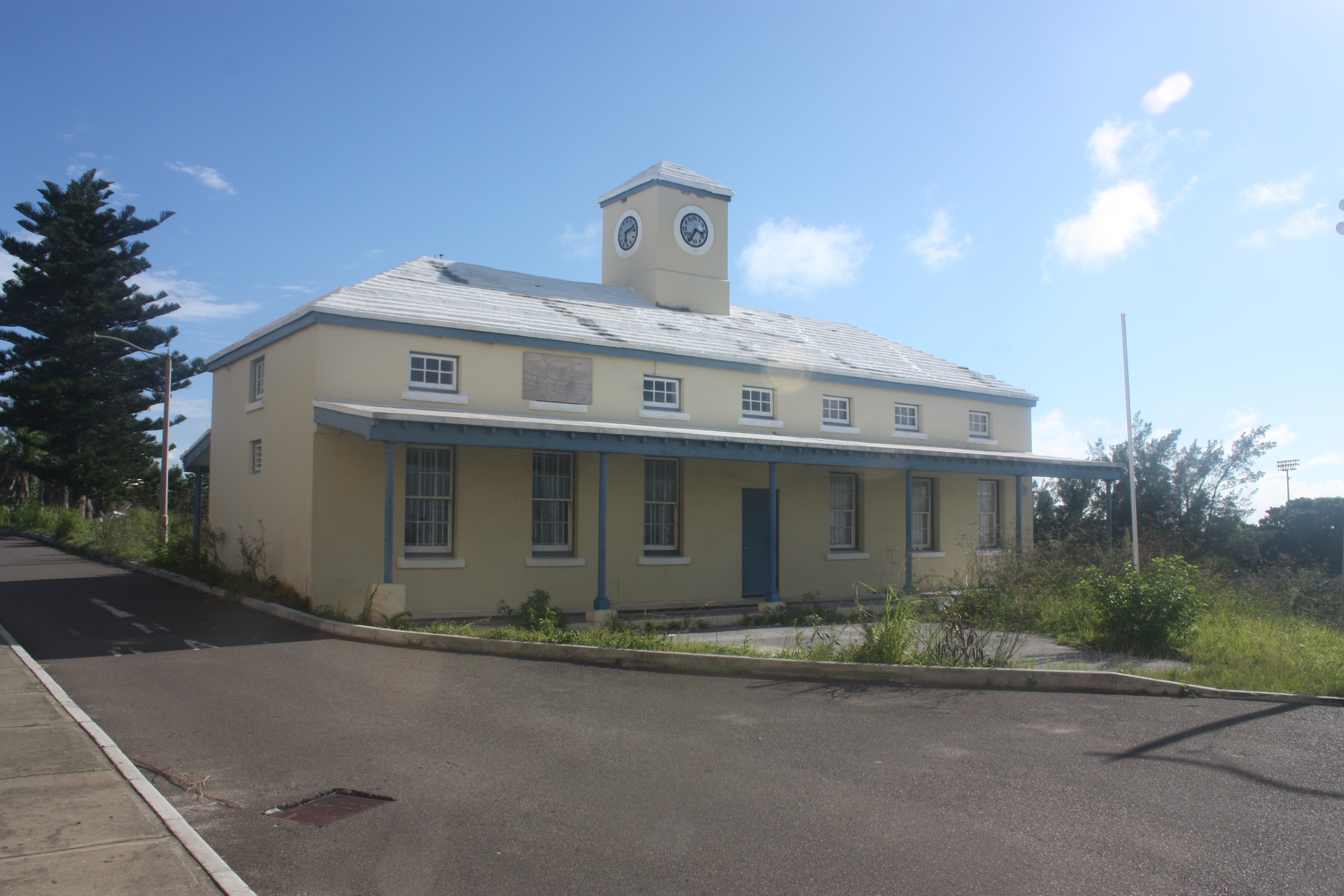
The Guard House at Prospect Camp, Devonshire, Bermuda in 2011

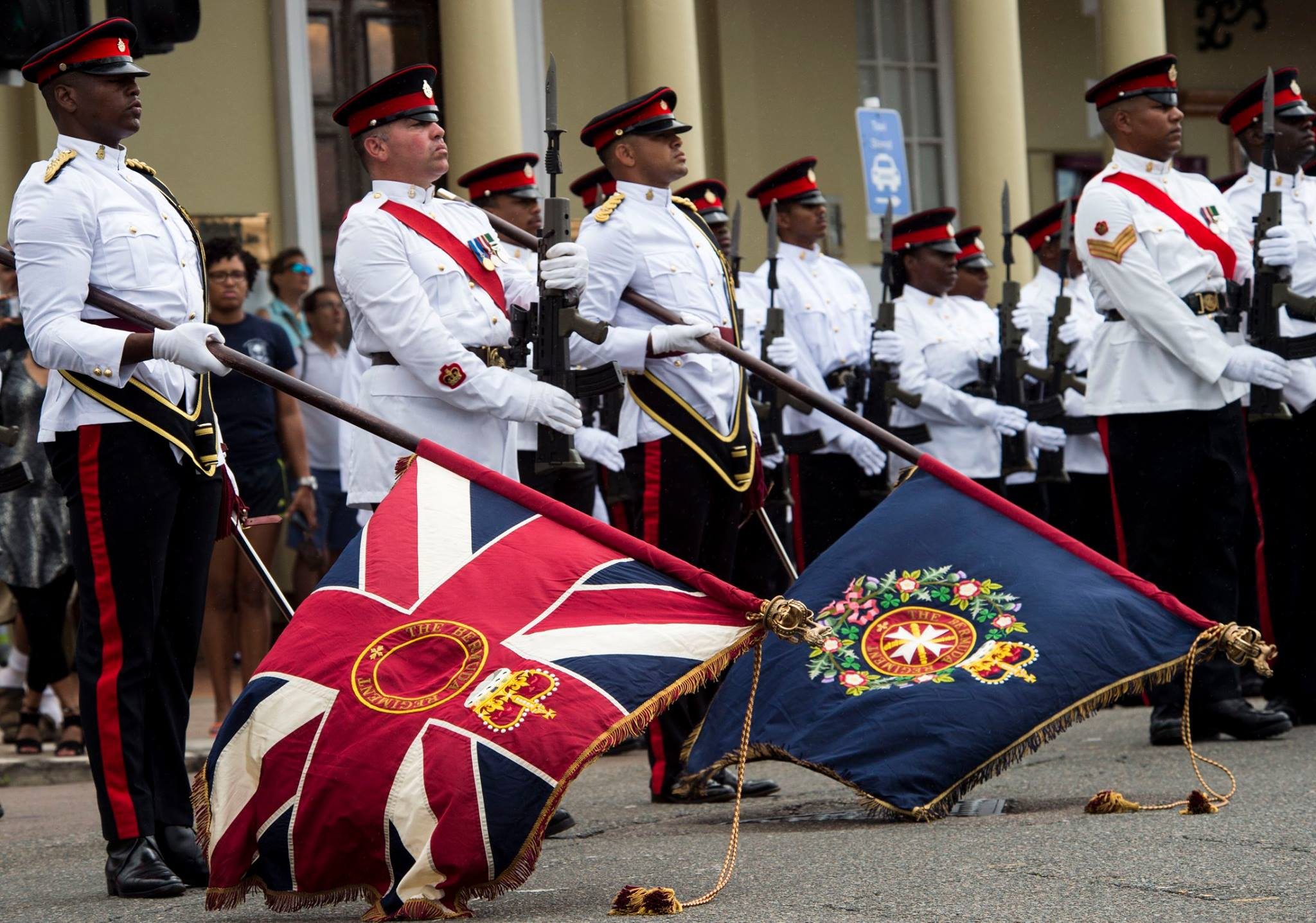
Colour party of the Royal Bermuda Regiment at Queen's Birthday Parade in 2017

== See also ==
- Imperial fortress
- Military of Bermuda
- St. George's Garrison
- Prospect Camp
- Warwick Camp
- Historic Town of St. George and Related Fortifications, Bermuda
- Castle Harbour Islands Fortifications
- Fort St. Catherine's
- Fort Victoria
- Scaur Hill Fort
- Ordnance Island
- St. David's Battery
- Fort George, Bermuda

== Bibliography ==
- Defence, Not Defiance: A History Of The Bermuda Volunteer Rifle Corps, Jennifer M. Ingham (now Jennifer M. Hind), The Island Press Ltd., Pembroke, Bermuda. ISBN 0-9696517-1-6
- The Andrew And The Onions: The Story Of The Royal Navy In Bermuda, 1795 – 1975, Lt. Commander Ian Strannack, The Bermuda Maritime Museum Press, The Bermuda Maritime Museum, P.O. Box MA 133, Mangrove Bay, Bermuda MA BX. ISBN 978-0-921560-03-6
- Bermuda Forts 1612–1957, Dr. Edward C. Harris, The Bermuda Maritime Museum Press, The Bermuda Maritime Museum. ISBN 978-0-921560-11-1
- Bulwark Of Empire: Bermuda's Fortified Naval Base 1860–1920, Lt.-Col. Roger Willock, USMC, The Bermuda Maritime Museum Press, The Bermuda Maritime Museum. ISBN 978-0-921560-00-5
- Cruikshank, Ernest (1964). "The County of Norfolk in the War of 1812". In Zaslow, Morris (ed.). The Defended Border. Toronto: Macmillan of Canada. OCLC 480289.
- Cruikshank, Ernest (2006) [1814]. The Documentary History of the campaign upon the Niagara frontier. (Part 1-2). University of Calgary. Archived from the original on 27 May 2011.
