= Bermuda Militia Artillery =

The Bermuda Militia Artillery
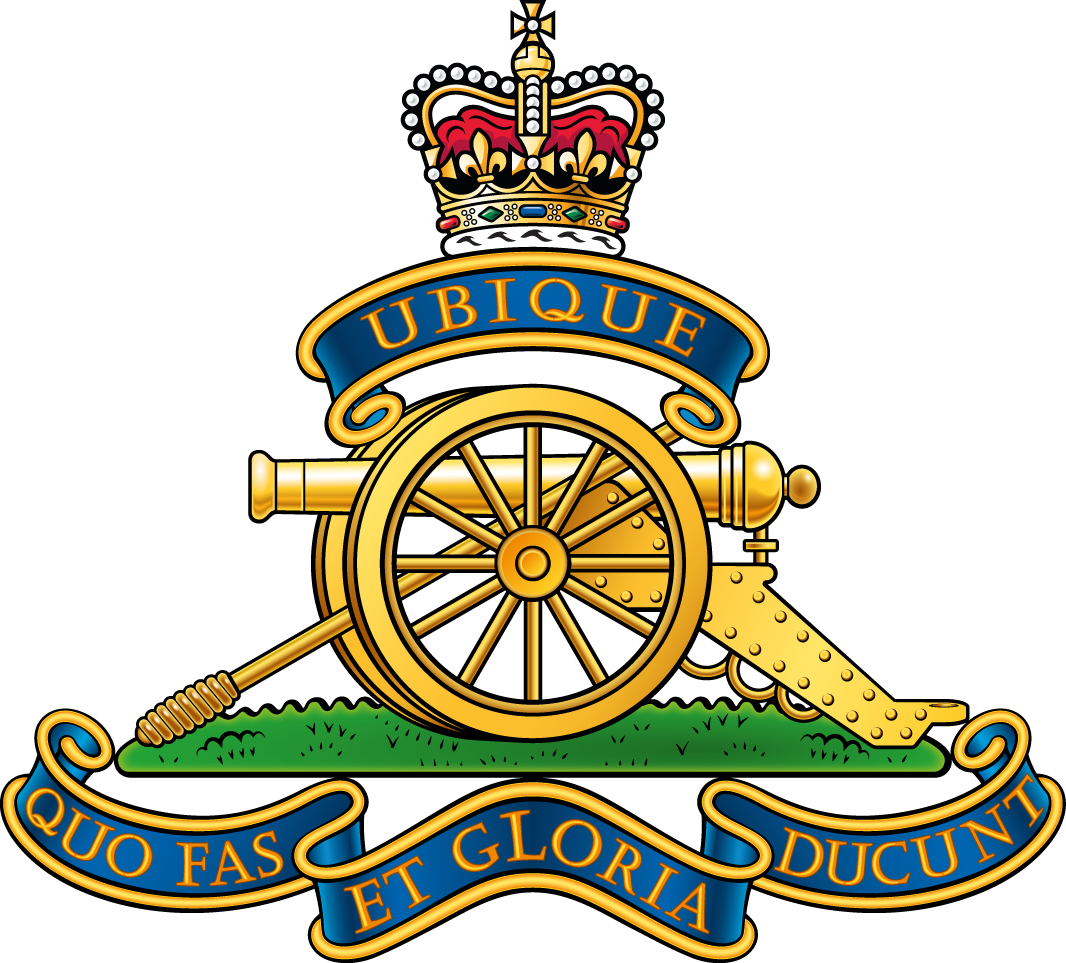
- Cap Badge of the Royal Artillery
- Country: Bermuda (United Kingdom overseas territory)
- Branch: British Army
- Type: Coastal artillery
- Garrison/HQ: St. David's Battery
- Anniversaries: 1 September 1965 (amalgamation into Bermuda Regiment)

The Bermuda Militia Artillery was a unit of part-time soldiers organised in 1895 as a reserve for the Royal Garrison Artillery detachment of the Regular Army garrison in the Imperial fortress colony of Bermuda. Militia Artillery units of the United Kingdom and Colonies were intended to man coastal batteries in times of war, which were manned by under-strength numbers of regular army gunners in peace time. The unit was embodied during both world wars, fulfilling its role within the garrison, and also sending contingents overseas to more active theatres of the wars.

== History ==
Bermuda had maintained its own militias (in which all able-bodied, adult males, free or enslaved, were required to serve) since British rule officially began in 1612. With the buildup of the Royal Naval Dockyard and the attendant Regular Army garrison in the years following the American War of Independence, however, the Government of Bermuda quickly lost interest in funding a militia that seemed superfluous. Following the American War of 1812, it ceased to renew the Militia Act, and the military reserve was allowed to lapse. For the next eight decades, the Secretary of State for War, and the Governor and Commander-in-Chief of Bermuda implored the local government in vain to raise a military reserve force as vast funds were channelled into building up the colony's defences. The colonial government, however, feared being saddled with the entire cost of maintaining the garrison, and was also concerned of the social discord that would result from raising either racially integrated or segregated units.

Major General Sir William Reid, Governor and Commander-in-Chief of Bermuda from 1839 to 1846, was forced to raise a body of voluntary reservists without the assistance of the local government, which recruited part-time soldiers into the regular army and the Board of Ordnance military corps without racial discrimination, although relatively few white Bermudians enlisted. Those serving in the army were trained as light infantry, with an emphasis on amphibious operations.

Although this unit was short-lived, other Bermudians appear to have continued to serve on a local-service, and presumably part-time, basis (many others simply enlisted as regular full-time soldiers) with the regular detachments in Bermuda (note First Sergeant Robert John Simmons of the 54th Regiment Massachusetts Volunteer Infantry, who died of wounds as a prisoner of war following the assault on Battery Wagner. Simmons was described by abolitionist, lecturer, novelist, playwright, historian and former slave William Wells Brown as "a young man of more than ordinary abilities who had learned the science of war in the British Army". Simmons was 26 when he died, and too young to have served under Reid's scheme).

In Britain, many citizens felt the government was neglecting the defence of Bermuda by deploying too much of the army around the World on garrison duty. The Militia and the Yeomanry (which could no longer rely on compulsory service), together with the regular army units that did remain in Britain, were unable to field forces thought adequate for the defence of the island against a large, modern continental army. Following the Crimean War, when reserve forces had to be dispatched to the war zone, it was realised that the British Army's Imperial garrison obligations not only left Britain vulnerable, but also did not leave aside sufficient uncommitted forces to compose an effective expeditionary force such as had been required in the Crimea. Britain's primary motivation in supporting the Ottoman Empire against Russia was to prevent the border of the Russian Empire advancing to meet that of British India. Potential Russian interference with Britain's East Asian trade was also a concern. Following the Indian Mutiny of 1857, it was feared that Indian units might be encouraged to mutiny should there be a Russian invasion, and might mutiny in any case were British units in India reduced in number.

As funds for the increase of the British Army were not forthcoming, and with the threat of invasion by France, the government tackled these issues by raising a Volunteer Force of part-time soldiers in 1859. Composed primarily of locally organised Volunteer Rifle Corps, this force could be embodied in times of emergency, but its volunteers could not be compelled to serve abroad. Although the volunteer rifle corps would prove popular, the most immediate requirement was for artillerymen to man the coastal batteries that were the first line of defence. To make up the shortfall of reserve gunners, a number of existing Militia infantry regiments were retrained as the Militia Artillery that, along with the remainder of the Militia, the Yeomanry, and the Volunteer Force, would be merged into the Territorial Force (subsequently the Territorial Army) in 1908, when terms-of-service (a set number of years for which the recruit was obligated to serve), among other changes, were introduced to the former volunteer units (from which soldiers could previously quit with fourteen days notice, except while embodied for training or active service). Terms of service had already applied to Militia soldiers.

In addition to creating these part-time reserve forces, the British Government sought to redeploy regular army units from imperial garrisons back to Britain, where they could be used for defence or to compose expeditionary forces to be sent overseas to war zones, and replacing them with full-time or part-time units raised locally. This proved difficult to accomplish. In some parts of the Empire, removing British Army regiments would invite insurrection, insurgency, or invasion (such as India, ever under threat from the Russian Empire, and which suffered the Great Mutiny of native regiments in 1857). Bermuda, while less likely to suffer insurrection, was an inviting target to Britain's potential enemies, notably the United States of America, thanks to its strategic location and the important Imperial defence assets located there, such as the Royal Naval Dockyard. Regular units could not be removed, therefore, 'til local reserves had been raised to replace them. As neither the London nor the Hamilton government was keen to pay for these units, decades more would pass before the regular army garrison in Bermuda began to be drawn down.

Bermuda's new tourism industry, pioneered in the latter 19th century by Princess Louise, Samuel Clemens and others, provided the Secretary of State with the leverage to compel the colonial government. He withheld his approval of American investment into the new Princess Hotel and the dredging of the shipping channel into St. George's Harbour as the first could provide a pretext for invasion (by the US, to protect the interests of its nationals), and the latter would make it easier for an enemy force to invade. The Secretary wrote that he could not approve either project while Bermuda contributed nothing to her own defence. Accordingly, the Parliament of Bermuda passed three acts drafted by the London Government authorising the creation of voluntary, part-time artillery, rifle, and sappers-and-miners (engineers) units. The last unit was not raised, and the Royal Engineers 27th Company (Submarine Mining), which had been permanently reassigned from Halifax, Nova Scotia, to Bermuda in 1888 (part of the company had been split off to create the new 40th Company, which remained in Halifax), continued to maintain the mine defences unaided. A reserve unit of engineers, the Bermuda Volunteer Engineers, would not be raised for another four decades.

== Foundation ==
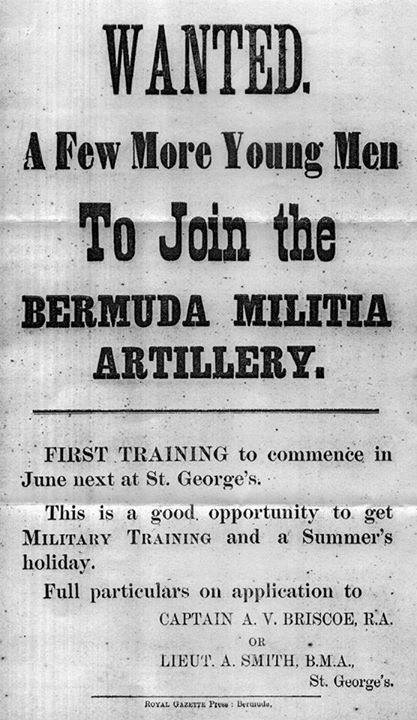
An 1895 recruiting advert for the Bermuda Militia Artillery, printed in The Royal Gazette.

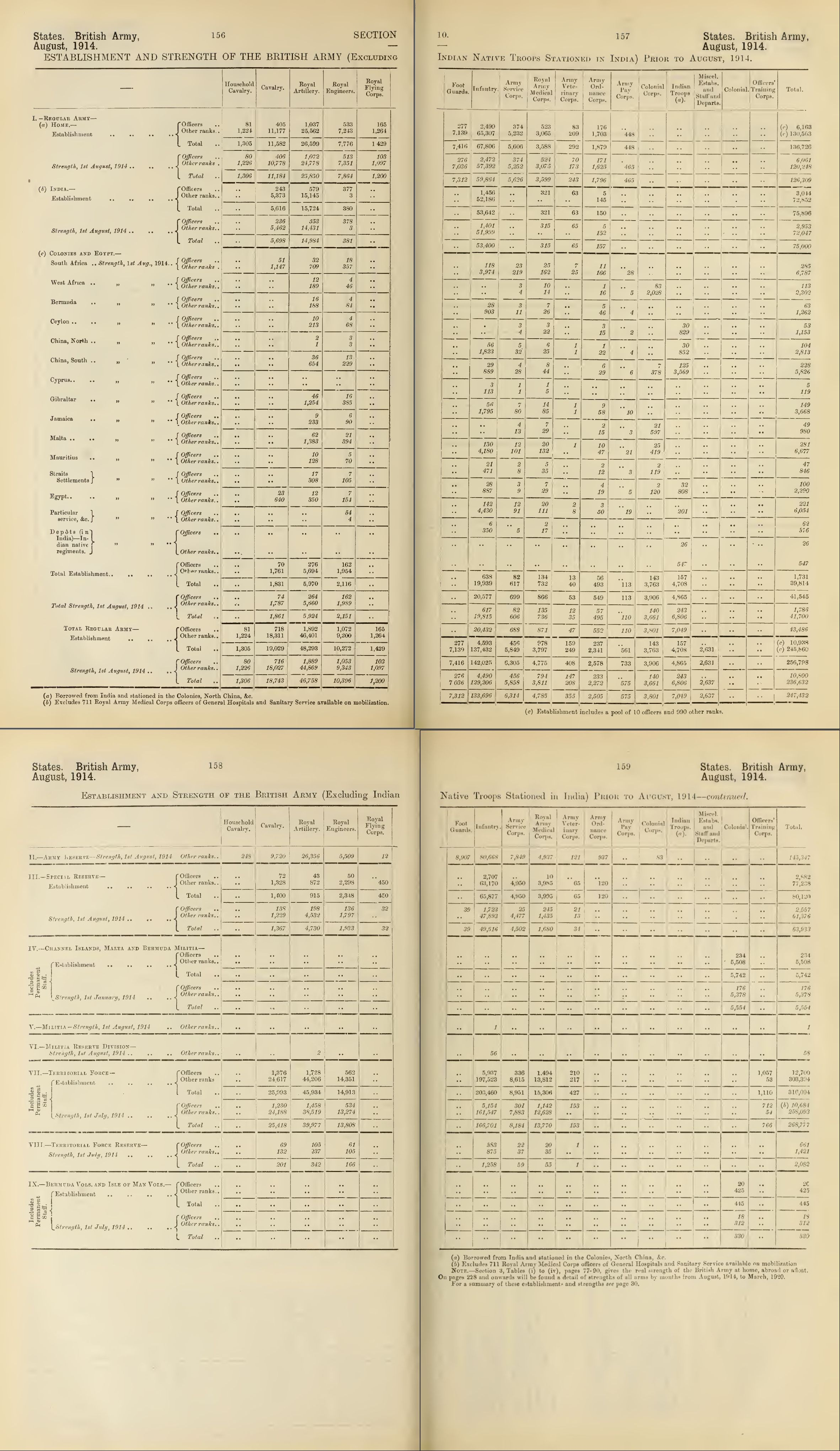
Establishment and Strength of the British Army (excluding Indian native troops stationed in India) prior to August 1914.

The Bermuda Militia Artillery (BMA), however, was raised in 1895. Although it was titled as a militia, it was in practice a voluntary organisation, akin to those of the Volunteer Force, except that volunteers for the Militia were enlisted for a term of service whereas members of the Volunteer Force could resign with fourteen days notice (except while embodied for training or active service).

The old militia, in England and Wales, as well as in Bermuda, had been a conscripted body of men who gathered annually to train, and could be called out and embodied in times of emergency. All males of military age who were fit to serve were required to do so. By the mid-19th century, the militia in Britain had become a smaller, voluntary force, from which the British Army often recruited trained soldiers. In Bermuda, which had seen the buildup of a regular army garrison, the militia had been allowed to lapse, but the American War of 1812 led to its resurrection. After the war, however, no further Militia Acts were passed and it ceased to exist.

Historically, the Militia Artillery (in Britain and in Bermuda) had been seen as the most critical component. Whereas the Militia infantry and the mounted units had embodied only for annual training, or during times or war or emergency (which included quelling the Privateer Riots in Bermuda), a standing force of the Militia Artillery had been required to maintain the coastal artillery defences in Britain and Bermuda, guarding against attacks that might come at any time. Also, the skills of the artilleryman required more training to acquire and maintain, and annual training camps were not sufficient, which led to more emphasis being placed on the requirements of the artillery. Advances in artillery and tactics, by the mid-19th century, had actually increased the importance of the militia gunners in Britain. In Bermuda, roughly five hundred artillery pieces were emplaced by mid-century, but without the support of a militia, the regular gunners were sufficient to man only a fraction of them.

Although not a continuation of the original militia, the titling of the new Bermudian artillery reserve as the Bermuda Militia Artillery, rather than as the Bermuda Volunteer Artillery, followed the practice then current in Britain for similar units, which, though voluntary, were a continuation of the old militia.

The other volunteer unit raised at the same time as the BMA, the Bermuda Volunteer Rifle Corps BVRC), restricted its recruitment to whites, and the BMA was made up almost entirely of blacks, although its officers were white. Although BVRC recruits, originally, could quit their corps with fourteen days notice, as with UK volunteer rifle regiments, BMA recruits enlisted for six years. After 27 days of basic training, they were liable only to attend annual camp. While in camp, they were subject to the Army Act, and military law. The BMA wore the standard Royal Artillery uniform, and cap badge.

Soldiers were originally recruited on a voluntary basis, though conscription was introduced during the Second World War, and re-introduced during the 1950s. Small contingents were sent to England in 1897, to take part in Queen Victoria's Diamond Jubilee, and in 1902, for the coronation of King Edward VII. At the first camp, in 1896, the unit had a single company with a strength of 10 men and three officers. A second company was added as its strength grew to more than 200 over the next decade, but, as recruitment fell, its numbers dropped below 100 men again by 1914. The unit was already embodied for annual camp when war was declared in 1914.

== The First World War ==
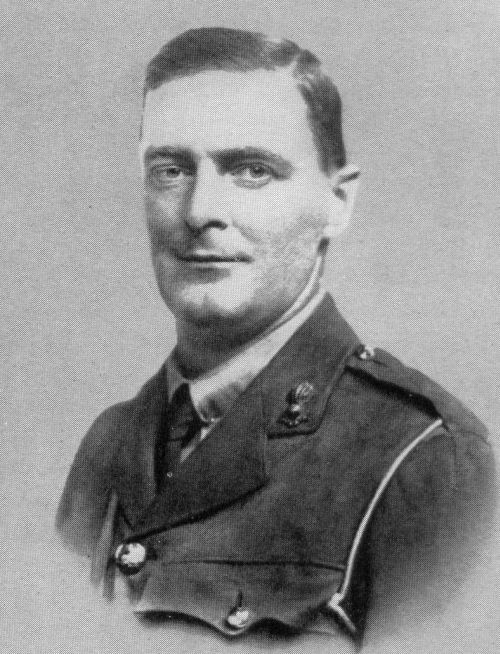
Major Thomas Melville Dill

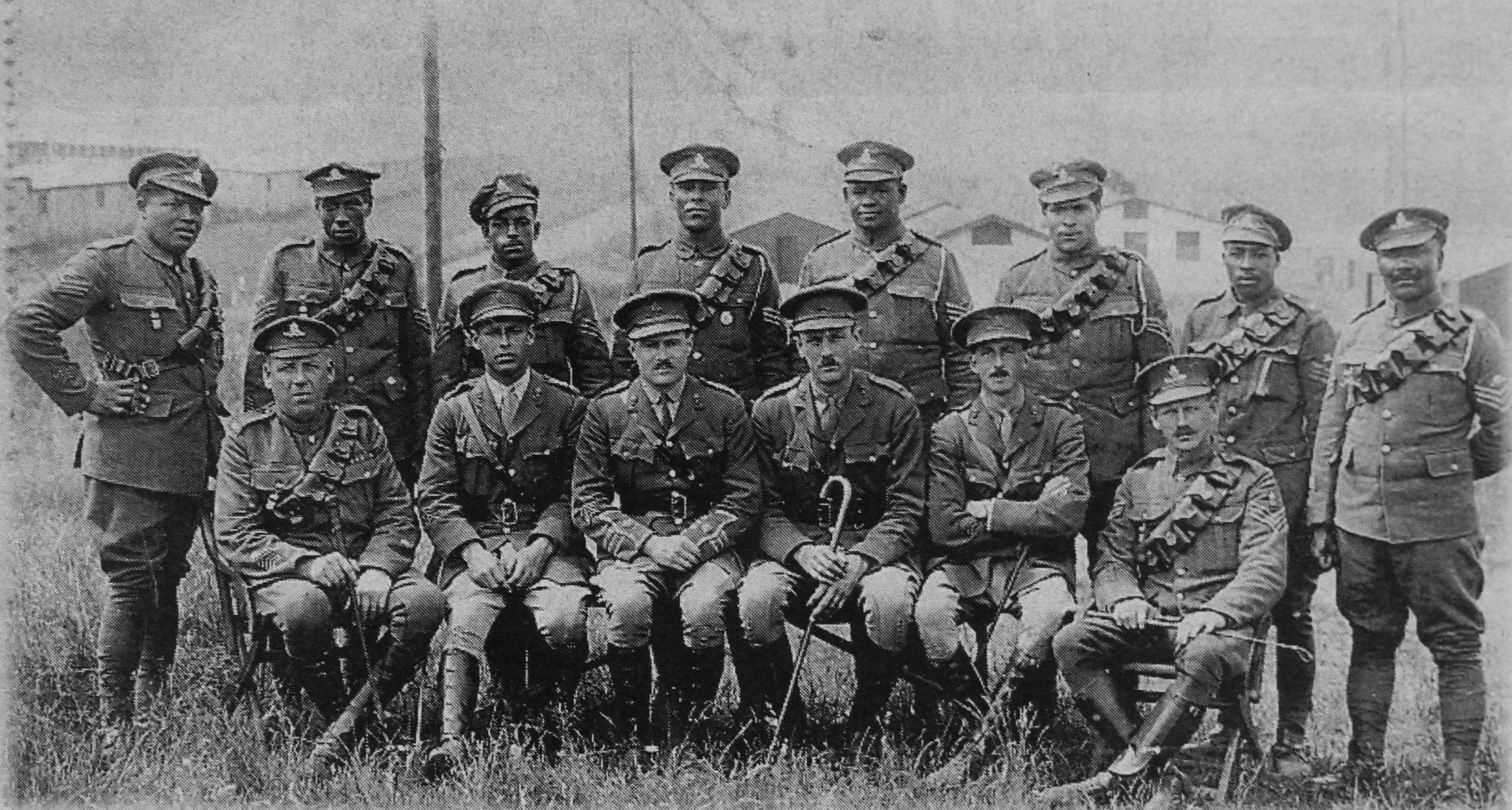
Officers and senior enlisted men of the Bermuda Contingent, Royal Garrison Artillery, in Europe.

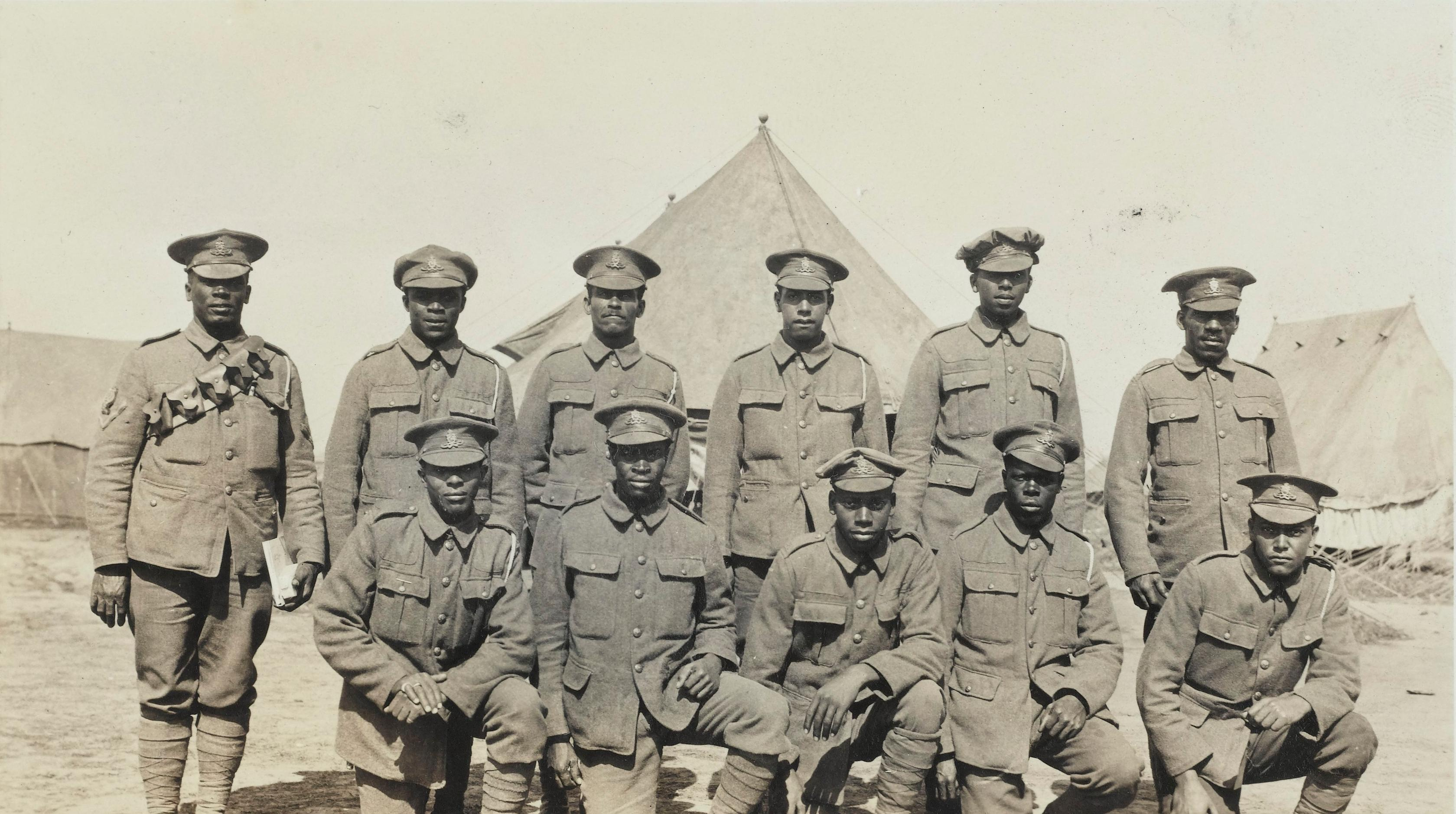
Soldiers of the Bermuda Contingent of the RGA in a Casualty Clearing Station in July 1916

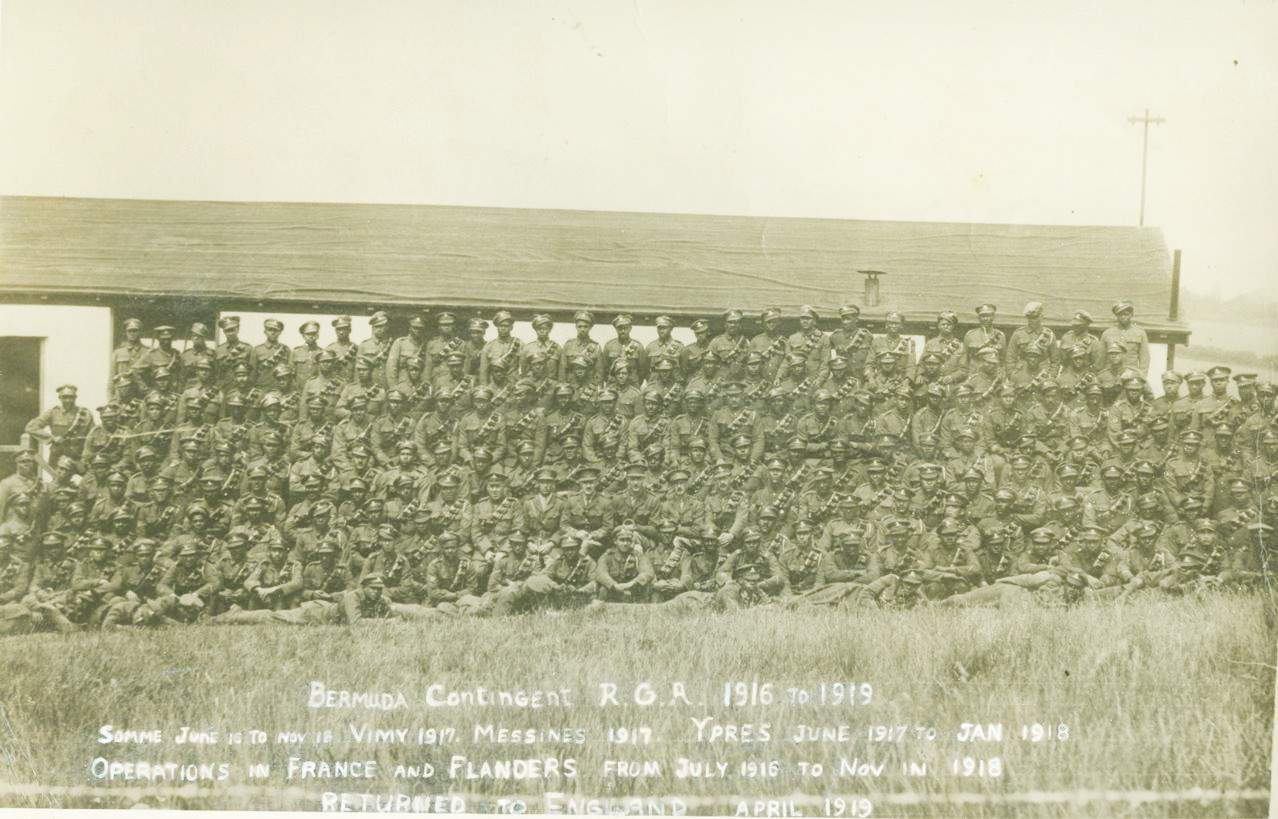
The Bermuda Contingent of the Royal Garrison Artillery

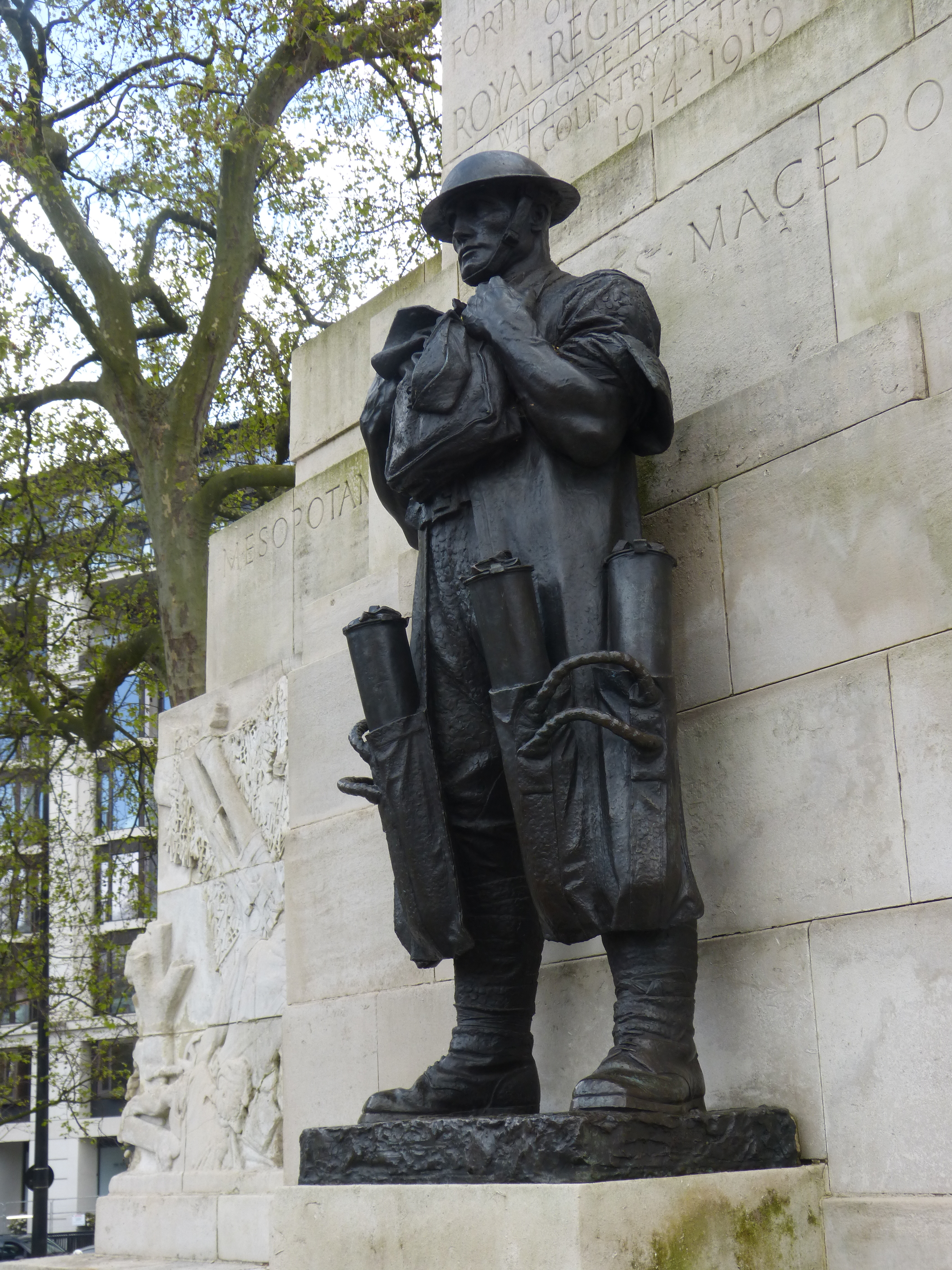
Shell carrier sculpture of the Royal Artillery Memorial in London, England

During the First World War, two contingents served as part of the larger Royal Garrison Artillery detachment to the Western Front. The first, 201 officers and men, under the command of Major Thomas Melville Dill, left for France on 31 May 1916. A second contingent, of two officers and sixty other ranks, left Bermuda on 6 May 1917, and was merged with the first contingent in France. The contingent, titled the Bermuda Contingent, Royal Garrison Artillery, served primarily in ammunition supply, at dumps, and in delivering ammunition to batteries in the field. The Contingent served at the Somme from June to December 1916. They were then moved away from the Front, serving on docks until April 1917, when they were attached to the Canadian Corps, serving in the Battle of Vimy Ridge. They took part in the Battle of Passchendaele (or the Third Battle of Ypres), from 24 June until 22 October, where three men were killed, and several wounded. Two men received the Military Medal. A total of 10 Gunners are commemorated on the CWGC Website. In Bermuda, the BMA was demobilised on 31 December 1918, and when the overseas contingent returned in July 1919, it was to no unit. Thirty men who chose to remain on temporarily re-enlisted in the RGA, and the rest were demobilised. Field Marshall Sir Douglas Haig commended the contingent, writing:

They were employed on heavy ammunition dumps, and great satisfaction was expressed with their work. Though called upon to perform labour of the most arduous and exacting nature at all times of the day and night, they were not only willing and efficient but also conspicuous for their cheeriness under all conditions. On more than one occasion the dumps at which they were employed were ignited by hostile shellfire and much of their work was done under shellfire. Their behaviour on all these occasions was excellent, and commanded the admiration of those with whom they were serving.

— Field Marshal Sir Douglas Haig, 1st Earl Haig

== Between the wars ==
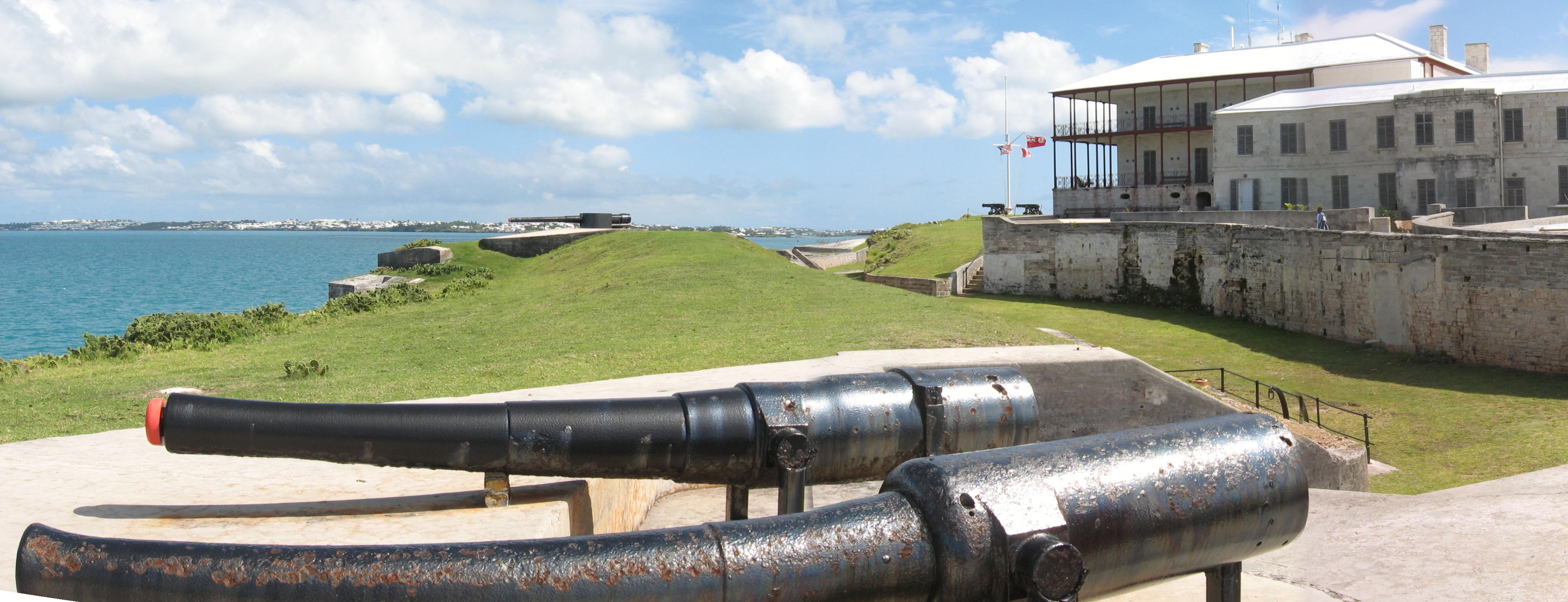
A 6" Breech Loading (BL) gun is visible mounted, in the background. Other restored guns await re-mounting at Royal Naval Dockyard, Bermuda.

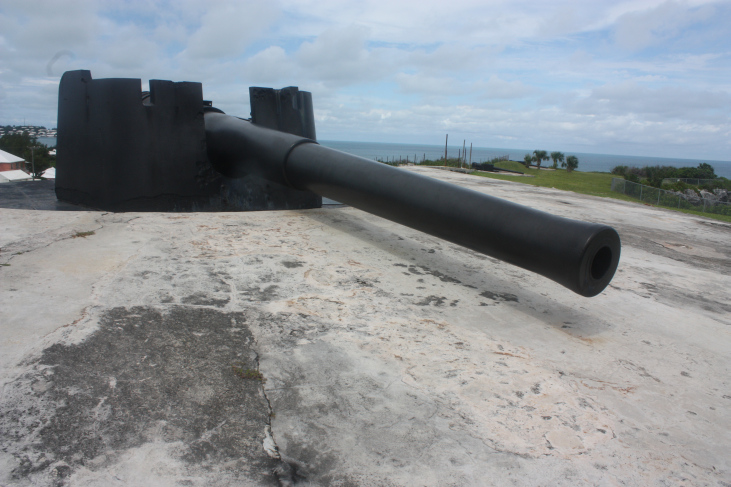
A 9.2" Breech Loading (BL) gun at St. David's Battery (or the Examination Battery), St. David's, Bermuda in 2011.Two 6" BLs are visible behind.

This was not the end for the BMA, however, as it was re-constituted for the annual camp of 1920, when fifty new recruits joined six officers and 154 other ranks who had enlisted before or during the war. In 1921, one company was tasked with providing mobile detachments, and the other for serving at fixed batteries.

In 1924, the Royal Garrison Artillery was amalgamated again with the Royal Horse Artillery and Royal Field Artillery as the Royal Artillery (within which the Royal Horse Artillery retained its distinct identity). In 1928, the last of the regular army Royal Artillery detachments, along with the Royal Engineers Fortress Company which manned searchlights at the batteries, were withdrawn from Bermuda due to post-war reductions in expenditure. By 1935, all of the batteries in Bermuda became inactive, except the Examination Battery at Saint David's Head, which the BMA assumed complete responsibility for operating. Also in 1928, the BMA was reorganised along the lines of the Territorial Army. Although it ceased at this point to be a militia unit, it was not re-titled as the Militia Artillery units in the United Kingdom had been.

With re-organisation as a territorial unit, training requirements became a weekly drill night, plus an annual two week camp. All of its enlisted men were discharged, and the unit slowly began to rebuild its strength through new recruitment. In 1930, the War Office also ceased funding annual camps outside of the British Isles, citing a lack of funds, and the Bermuda government began funding training. Although the colonial government began paying a contribution towards the costs of the BVRC during this period, the Imperia government remained completely responsible for funding the BMA until its re-organisation in 1951. In 1931, a new territorial unit, the Bermuda Volunteer Engineers (BVE), was raised to take up the role of manning the search light detachment at Saint David's Battery (and in 1940 it also absorbed the BVRC signals element, providing wireless communications for the garrison).

In 1936, on the occasion of the death of King George V, the BMA was involved in what could have been a severe international incident. The BMA had been instructed to fire a memorial salute from one of the two 4.7" guns at Saint David's Battery. This salute was to consist of seventy blank rounds, one for each year of the King's life, fired at one-minute intervals. Because of the difficulty of storing ammunition in Bermuda's humid climate, there proved to be only twenty-three rounds of blank ammunition in stock, and the remainder used were all headed ammunition. As the firing was to commence at 8am (on 21 January), and it was thought unlikely any vessels would be in the danger area, it was decided to proceed with the salute, ensuring the guns were elevated for maximum range (8,000 yards), out to sea. The firing began at 08:00, and was over seventy minutes later. What the BMA gunners were unaware of, however, was that a Colombian Navy destroyer, the ARC Antioquia, was at the receiving end of their barrage. The destroyer. built in Portugal by a British company, was under the command of a retired Royal Naval officer (part of the British Naval Mission to Colombia), and was arriving at Bermuda to undergo repairs at the HM Dockyard. Although the ship's crewmembers were alarmed to find themselves on the receiving end of an artillery barrage, the ship fortunately was not hit.

== The Second World War ==
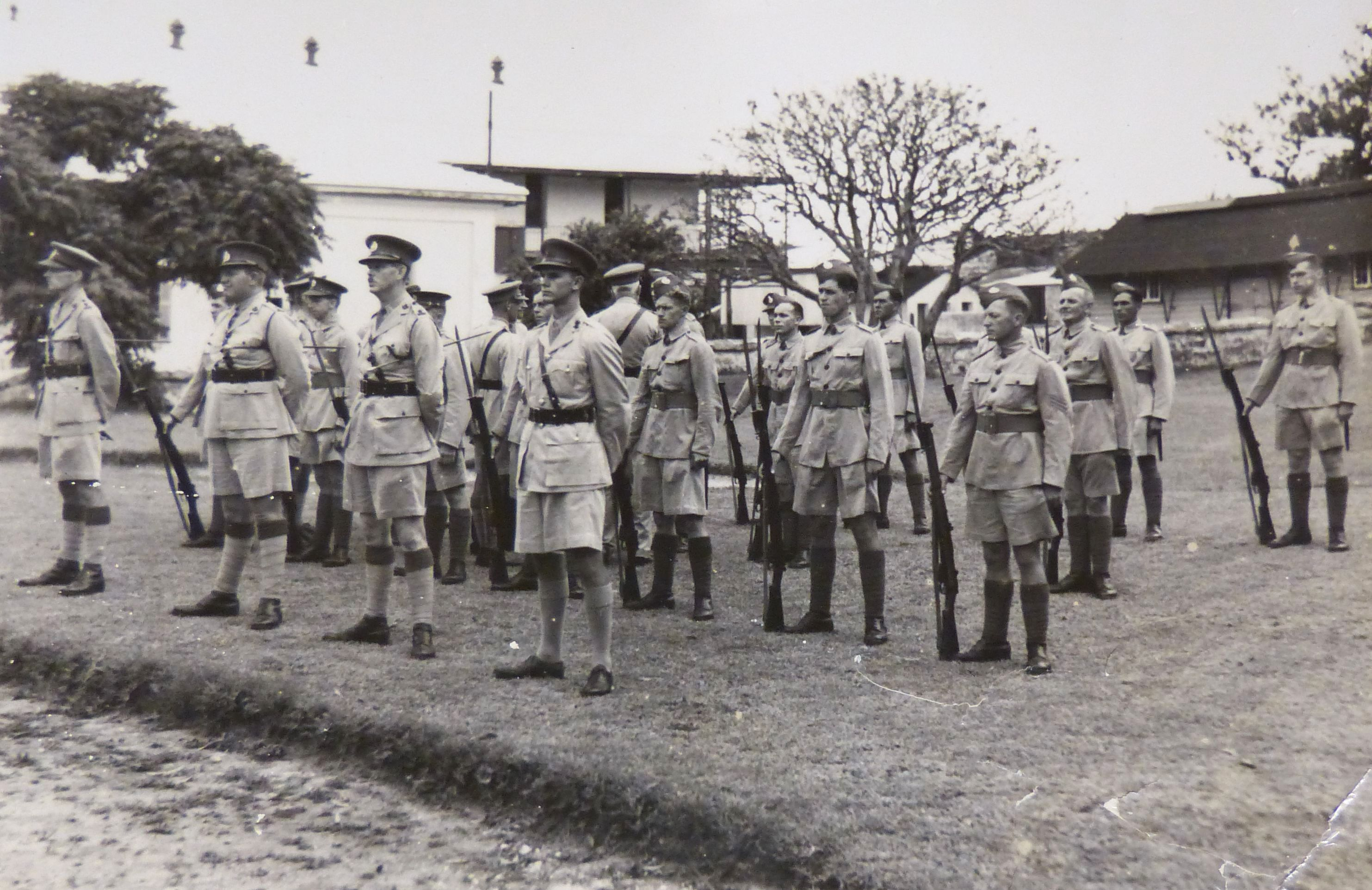
Governor and General Officer Commanding, Lieutenant-General Sir Denis Bernard, inspects the First BVRC Contingent to the Lincolnshire Regiment at Prospect Camp on 22 June 1940. Lieutenant Patrick Lynn Purcell, BMA, attached for transit, is at left of front row (right of photo).

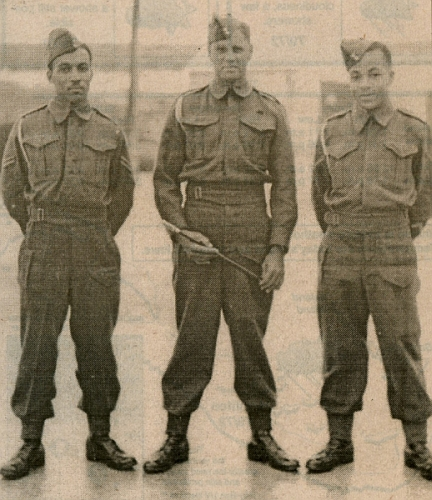
Warrant Officer and NCOs of the BMA at the Examination Battery, St. David's, Bermuda, ca. 1944.

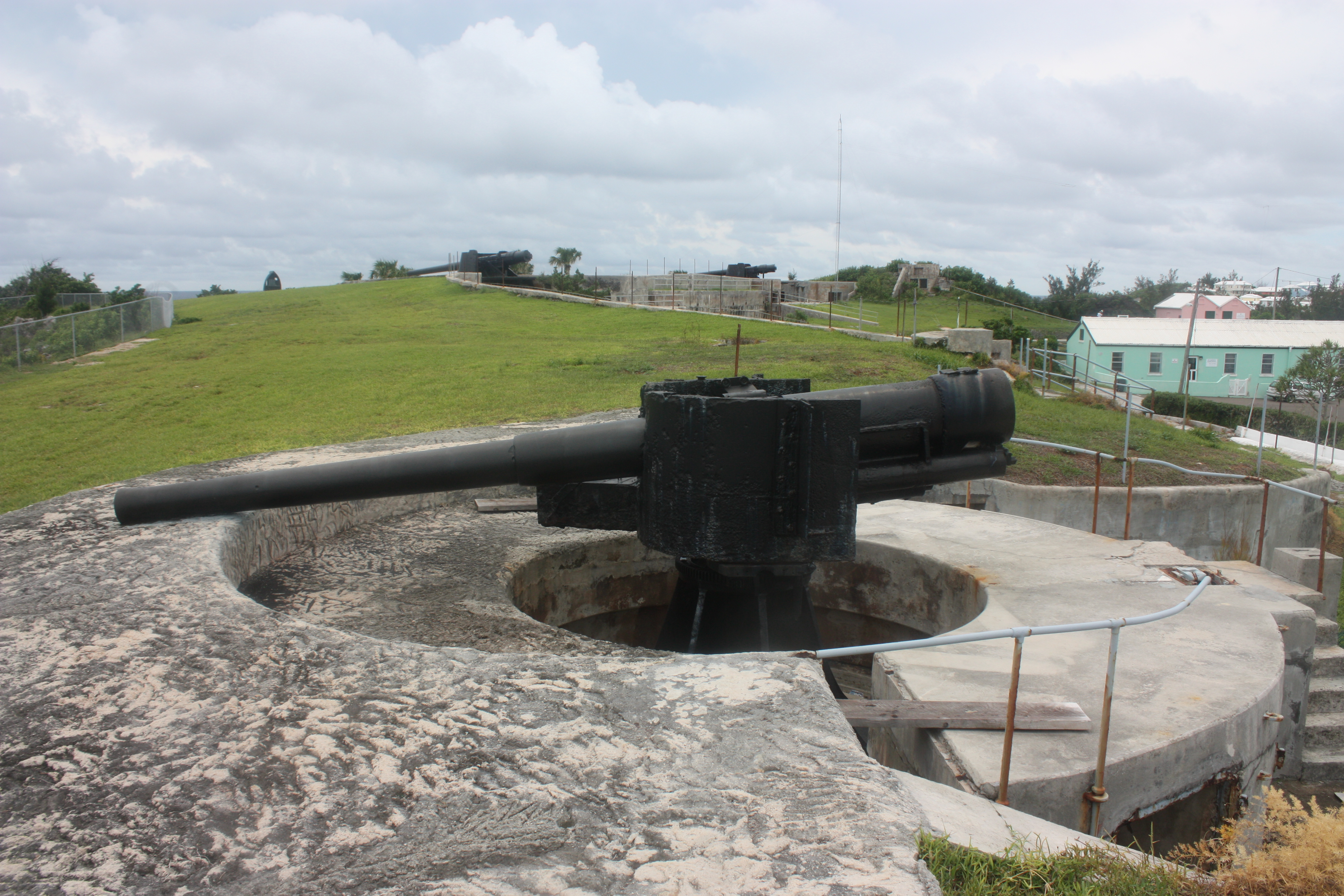
One of two 6 inch RBLs, with two 9.2 inch RBLs visible beyond, at St. David's Battery, in 2011

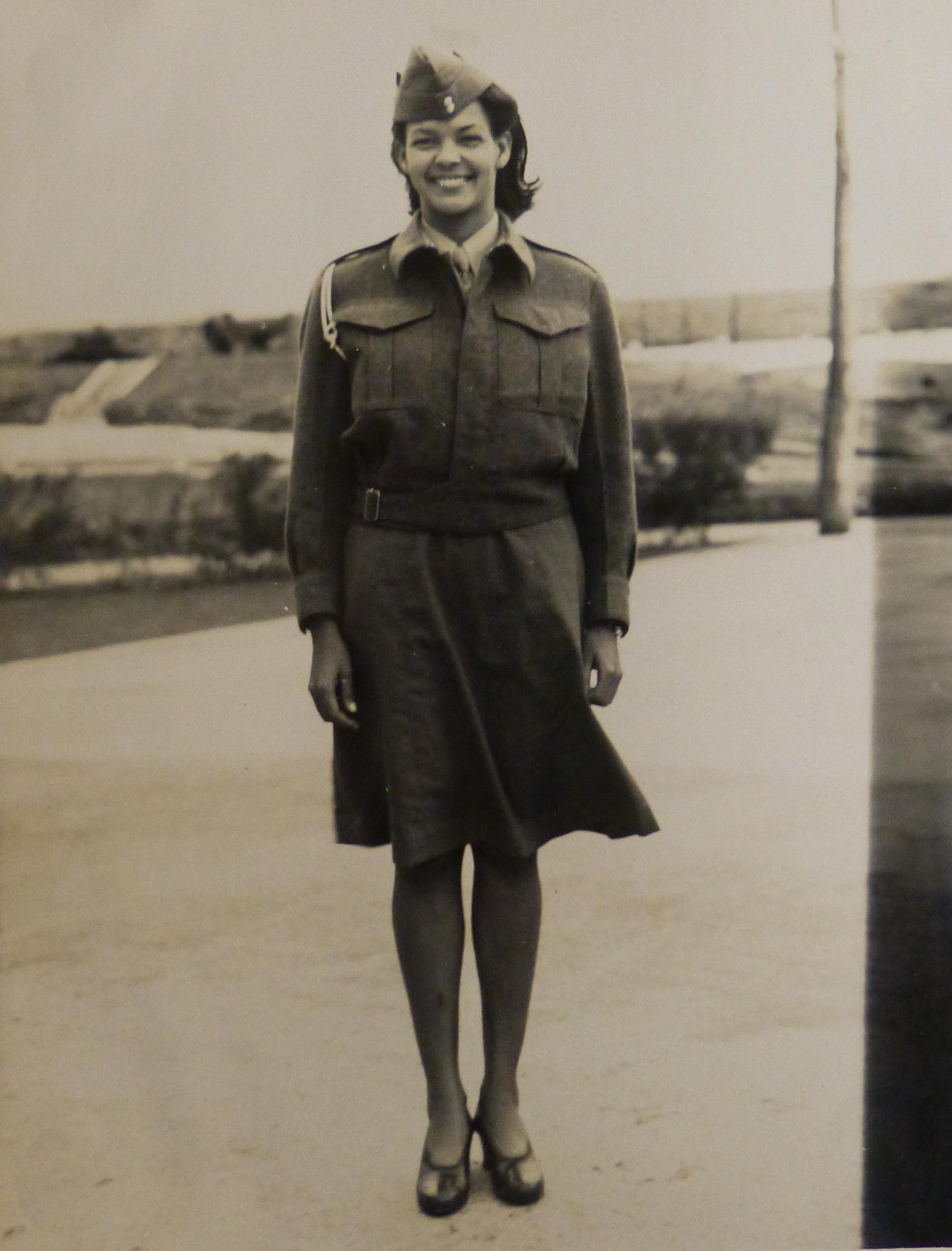
Bermuda Militia Artillery Clerk June Reid at St. David's Battery circa 1944

In 1939, a new battery of two 6" guns was constructed at Warwick Camp. Despite this, the manpower requirements of the BMA simply did not make full use of the number of black males available for military service when the war began. Rather than integrate the BVRC or the BVE, it was decided to raise a second infantry unit, the Bermuda Militia Infantry, to recruit blacks, and this was grouped administratively with the BMA. Forces throughout the Empire were mobilised on 3 September 1939, in anticipation of the declaration of war. Unlike in the Great War, when the two local units relied entirely on volunteers, conscription was introduced soon after the outbreak of hostilities, with blacks directed into the BMA or BMI, and whites into the BVRC. Volunteers and conscripts served full-time for the duration of the War.

In June 1940, the BVRC sent a small contingent of volunteers to the Lincolnshire Regiment depot in England. A handful of volunteers from the BMA and the BVE travelled with them, separating in England to join the regular artillery or engineers. The BMA contribution to that contingent consisted of a single officer, Lieutenant Patrick Lynn Purcell, who, like most of the BMA's white officers, had begun his service in the ranks of the BVRC. Purcell would serve with the a coastal artillery detachment of the Royal Artillery in Sierra Leone, due to his similar experience with the BMA. He eventually transferred to the Lincolnshire Regiment, serving in North West Europe, and, having reached the rank of Major, being appointed Press Officer of the British Area of Occupation in Germany, following victory in Europe.

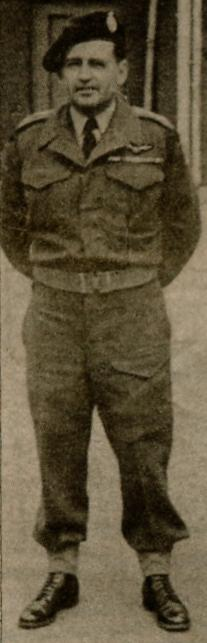
Captain RM Gorham, 1953

The 1940 contingent was to be the last from Bermuda for nearly four years. Some members of the Bermuda Militia were selected for pilot training at the Bermuda Flying School, and sent on to the Royal Air Force. After the school closed in 1942 (due to a surplus of trained pilots), the organisation overseeing it was converted into a recruiting and selection arm of the Royal Canadian Air Force, sending 60 volunteers, primarily from the various local military units, to that service for aircrew training before the end of the War.

Second-Lieutenant Richard Masters Gorham, who had been commissioned into the Bermuda Militia Artillery from the ranks of the Bermuda Volunteer Engineers on 20 December 1940, to replace Second Lieutenant Francis J. Gosling (who had trained as a pilot at the Bermuda Flying School and was to depart for the United Kingdom in January for transfer to the Royal Air Force) learnt of an instruction from the Army Council that prevented commanding officers from barring officers under their command from taking any training course for which they volunteered. Gorham and Second-Lieutenant Michael F. Gregg (who had been commissioned into the Bermuda Militia Artillery from the ranks of the Bermuda Volunteer Engineers on 28 May 1941) relinquished their Bermuda Militia Artillery local-service commissions on 27 June 1942 in order to receive regular Royal Artillery emergency commissions on 8 July 1942. Trained as pilots by the Royal Air Force, they served in air observation post squadrons controlled by the Royal Air Force but with gunners as pilot-fire controllers. Gorham served in North Africa and Italy. In Italy, while in command of B Flight of 655 Squadron, RAF, he played the decisive role in the Battle of Monte Cassino when he spotted a German division moving in half-tracked German Armoured Personnel Carriers to counter attack the British 5th Division and the Polish Corps, which were themselves attacking the German-occupied monastery. Contacting the senior Royal Artillery fire control officer on the ground. All two-thousand field guns within range were switched from their local targets and placed under his control. Gorham directed their fire down onto the German Division. The guns fired for hours, with Gorham taking turns with other AOP pilots. The German division was completely destroyed, and the Allied ground forces broke through four days later. For this action, Gorham received the Distinguished Flying Cross, a relative rarity for an Army officer. After the war, Gorham would serve as a captain, second-in-command of the Bermuda Rifles (as the Bermuda Volunteer Rifle Corps was retitled in 1949). On his retirement in 1954, He retired from the army with the substantive rank of captain, he was awarded the honorary rank of colonel in the Royal Artillery and was subsequently knighted.

Despite that steady outward trickle, however, fears of weakening the garrison meant that a moratorium on further drafts from the island was in force until 1943. By then, the likelihood of a German attack, or sabotage, had greatly diminished, and American forces, including artillery detachments, had been built-up on the island. This meant that local forces could be spared for service overseas, and both the BVRC and the Bermuda Militia detached companies to send across the Atlantic. The Bermuda Militia force, composed of members of the BMA and the BMI, trained with the BVRC contingent as an infantry force at Prospect Camp. The BVRC contingent was sent to the Lincolns in 1944. The Bermuda Militia contingent, however, proceeded to North Carolina, where it formed the training cadre of a new regiment, the Caribbean Regiment, being formed on a US Army base in North Carolina. Contingents, mostly of new recruits, were sent from various West Indian territories. In North Carolina, they were assessed for fitness, then trained as infantry. The unit was then posted to Italy in 1944. After serving briefly in the field, the Regiment escorted a shipment of Axis prisoners to Egypt, then remained there as prisoner-of-war (POW) camp guards until the end of hostilities. The Caribbean Regiment was disbanded after the war, and the Bermuda Militia contingent members returned to their original units in Bermuda. The BMI, along with the BVE, was disbanded in 1946. The BMA and the BVRC were both reduced to a skeleton command structure before recruitment for both units began again in 1951. The two were then grouped together, by the Defence (Local Forces) Act, 1949, under the command of Headquarters, Local Forces.

== Post war ==
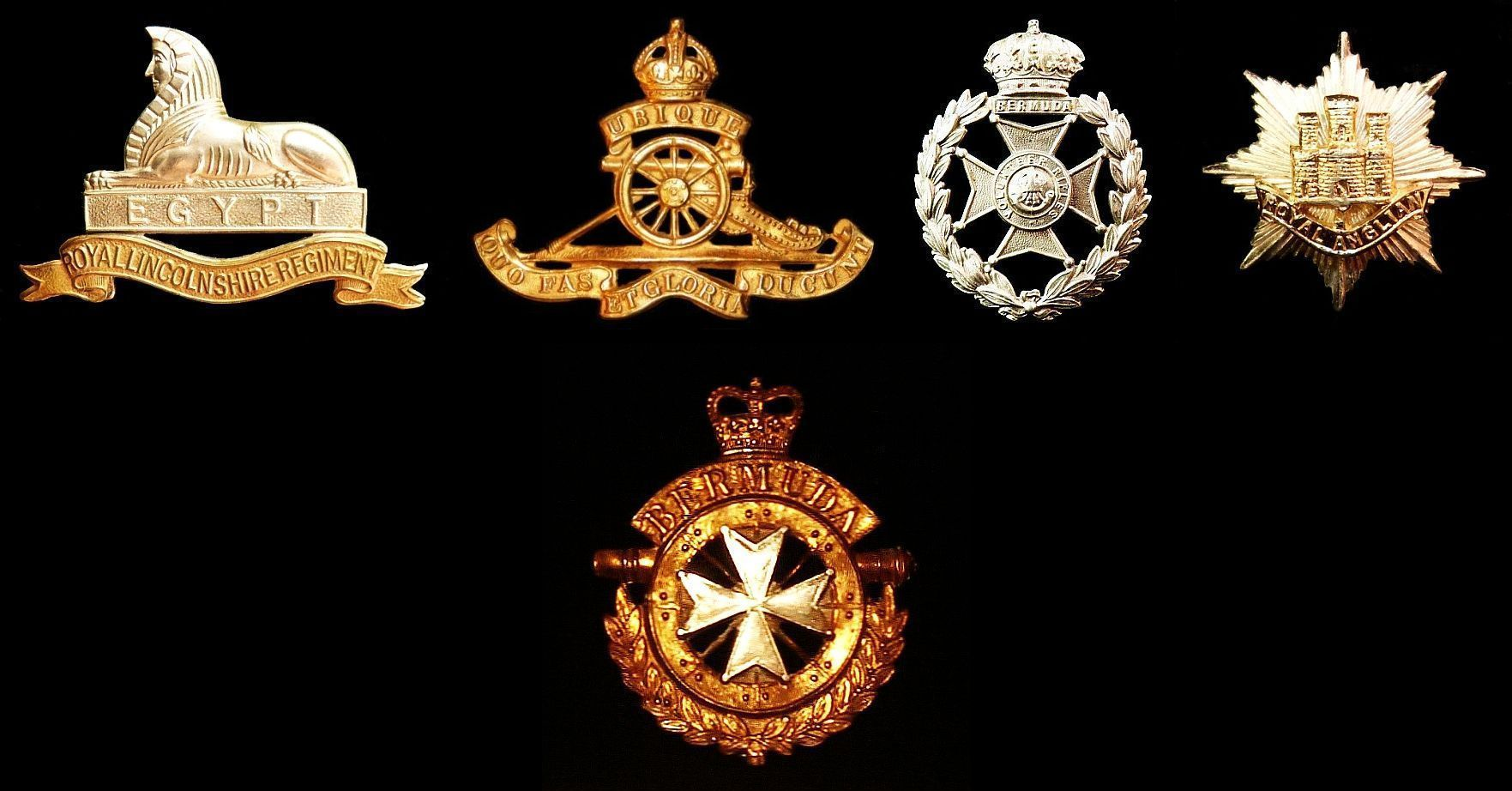
The badge of the Royal Bermuda Regiment (bottom) draws elements from those of the BMA (Royal Artillery, second from left) and the BVRC (second from right). The others belong to the Royal Lincolnshire Regiment, affiliated to the BVRC, and its successor, the Royal Anglian Regiment

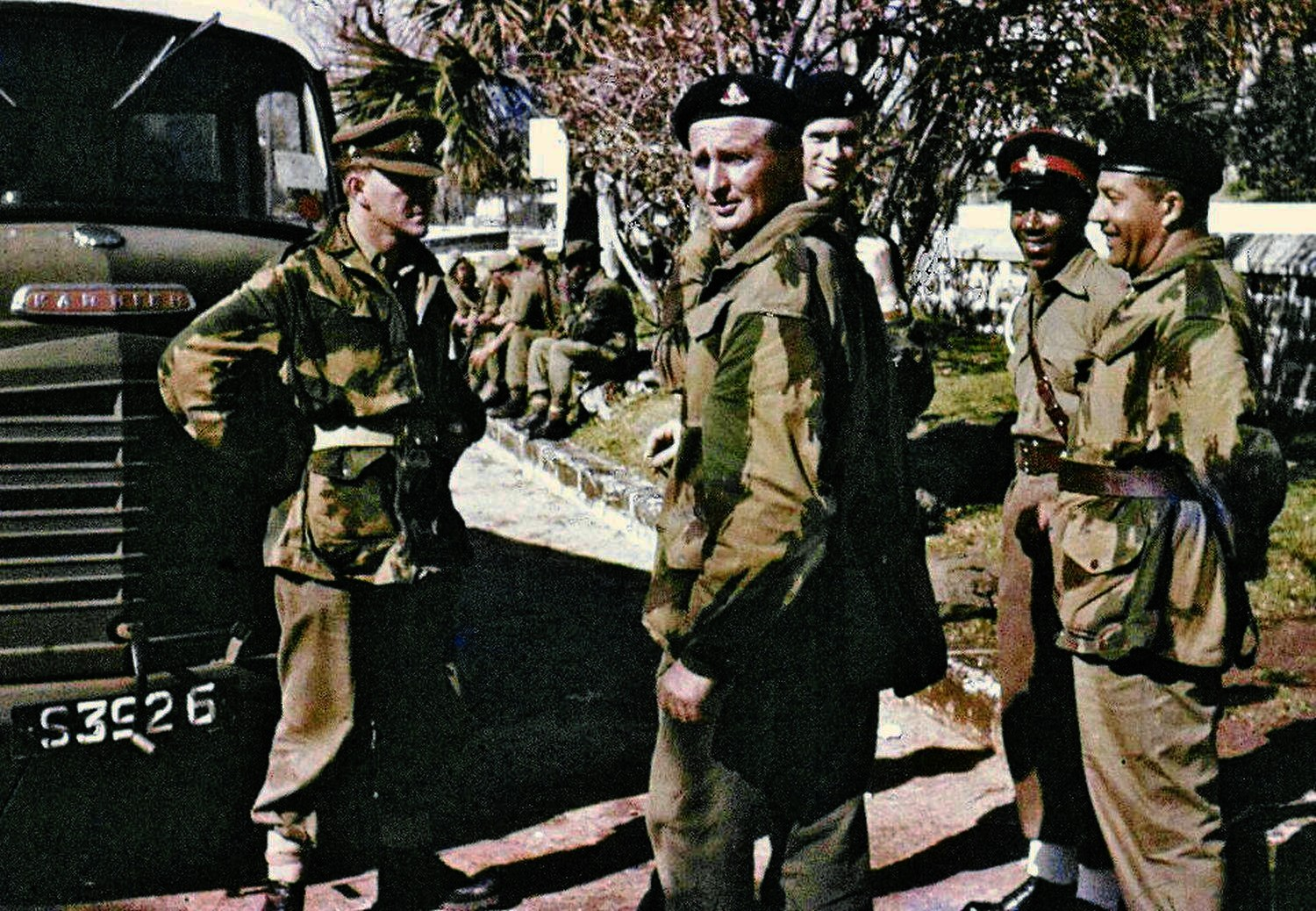
Officer Commanding, Bermuda Militia Artillery Major JA Marsh DSO with bar, OBE

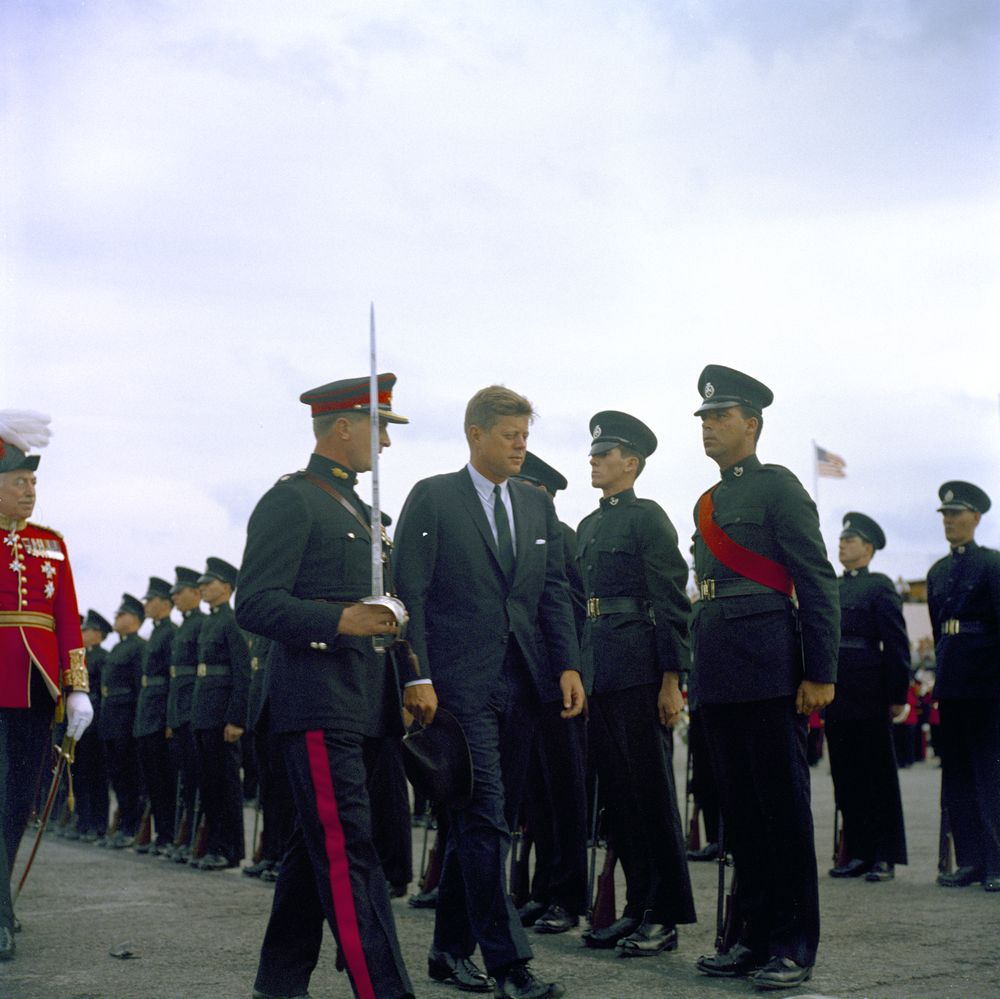
US President JF Kennedy and Major JA Marsh inspect a Bermuda Militia Artillery and Bermuda Rifles honour guard in 1961

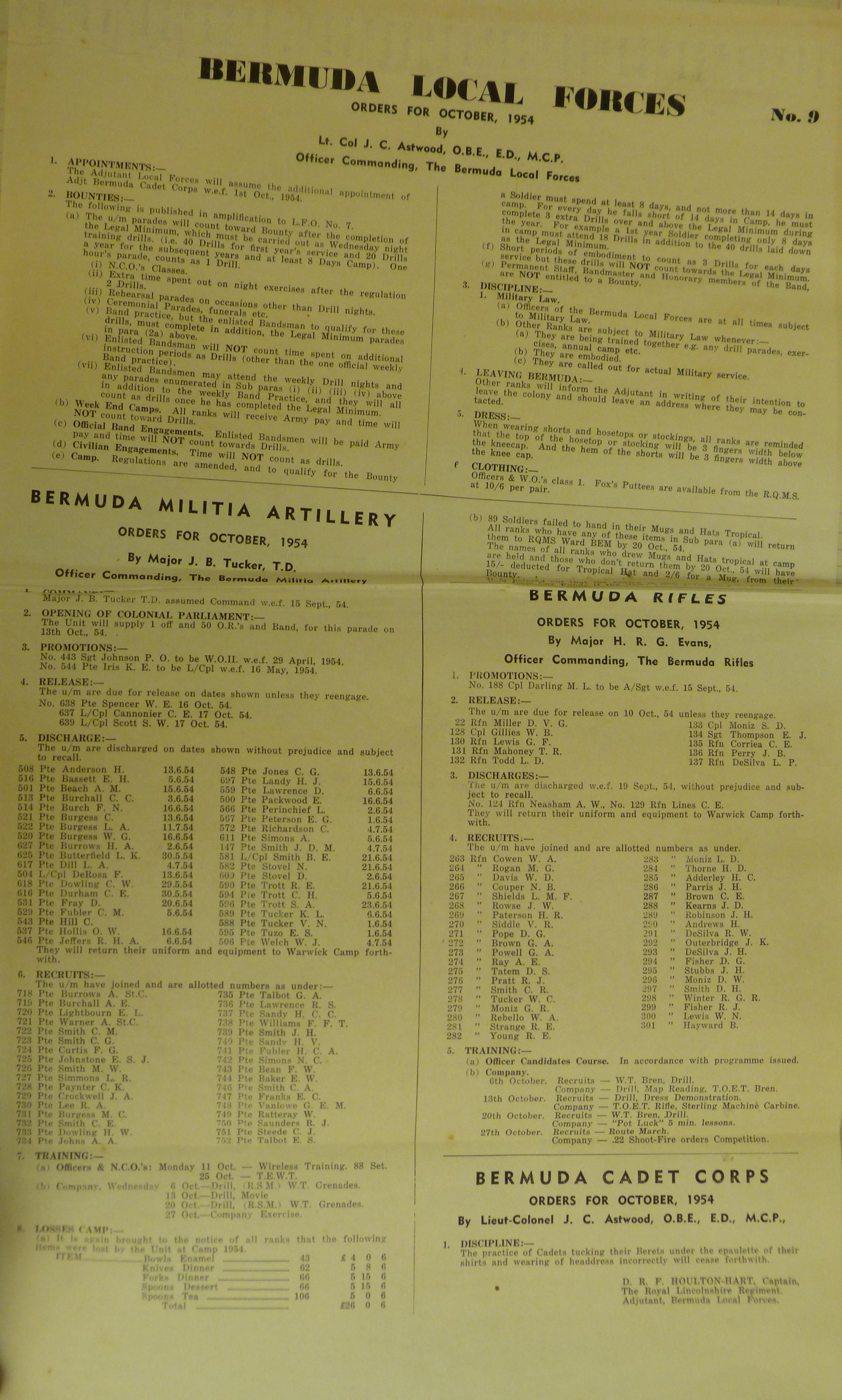
Bermuda Local Forces Orders, October 1954

The military garrison existed primarily to defend the Royal Naval Dockyard, Bermuda located on Ireland Island. It was announced in 1950 that the dockyard would be closed, and the military garrison was withdrawn along with it. The last Imperial Defence Plan was produced in 1953, and this was the last year in which the BMA and the BVRC were tasked under it. The Regular Army was withdrawn, ostensibly, on 25 April 1953, but detachments would be posted on the island until 1957 when a company of the Duke of Cornwall's Light Infantry (DCLI) was withdrawn, along with the Command Headquarters and various detachments and attachments from other corps.

The local territorials might have been disbanded as their Imperial defence taskings had disappeared, but the Bermuda Government chose to maintain both remaining units, entirely at its own cost. The last coastal artillery pieces were removed from use in 1953, however, and, rather than integrate the BVRC, it was decided to convert the BMA to the infantry role. The unit continued to wear the Royal Artillery uniform and cap badge, but was re-organised, equipped and trained. This also required changes to the rank and command structure as an infantry unit requires more junior NCOs than a comparably-sized artillery unit. As an infantry unit, it was relocated to Warwick Camp, along with the Bermuda Rifles. Conscription was reintroduced, to the Bermuda Rifles in 1957, and to the BMA in 1960, although both units remained part-time. The permanent staff members of the BMA were now provided by Regular Army infantry units, instead of artillery units. Also in 1953, the first coloured officer was commissioned from the ranks.

In 1965, with racial segregation rapidly becoming politically inexpedient, it was decided to end the unnecessary duplication of effort and the BMA was amalgamated with the Bermuda Rifles (as the BVRC had been renamed) on 1 September, to create the Bermuda Regiment (since 2015, the Royal Bermuda Regiment).

Originally, the part-time reserve units in Bermuda, the Channel Islands and Malta had numbered collectively (as 28th, circa 1945) in the British Army order of precedence, but were ordered within that according to the placement of their parent corps in the regular army. This meant, that the Bermuda Militia Artillery (BMA), as part of the Royal Regiment of Artillery, preceded the Bermuda Volunteer Rifle Corps (BVRC) despite being the second of the two to be raised. Today, the Royal Bermuda Regiment, as an amalgam of the BMA and BVRC, is 28th.

== See also ==
- Militia Artillery units of the United Kingdom and Colonies
- Bermuda Garrison
- Royal Bermuda Regiment
- Royal Artillery
- British Army
- Territorial Army (United Kingdom)

== Part of ==
- Bermuda Garrison
- Military of Bermuda
