= Warwick Camp =

British Army base in Bermuda

- Bermuda
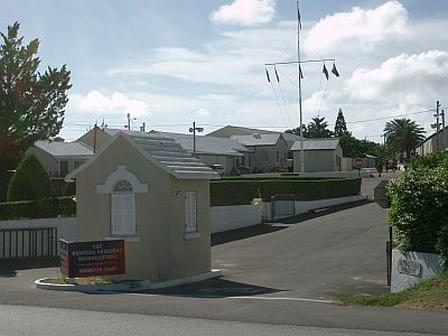
- The main gate of Warwick Camp, as it appears today, from the South Shore Road

Site information
- Type: Barracks; Rifle ranges Coastal artillery batteries
- Owner: Government of Bermuda
- Operator: British Army

Location
- Location in Bermuda
- Coordinates: 32.25708°N 64.81559°W

Site history
- Built: 1869
- Built for: War Office
- In use: 1869-Present

Garrison information
- Garrison: Bermuda Garrison
- Occupants: Royal Bermuda Regiment

'Warwick Camp' was originally the rifle ranges and a training area used by units of the Bermuda Garrison based elsewhere in the colony. Today, the Camp is the home of the Royal Bermuda Regiment.

== Early history ==
Warwick Camp in 1869, with tents set up on the 800 yard rifle range.

Warwick Camp, ca. 1870.

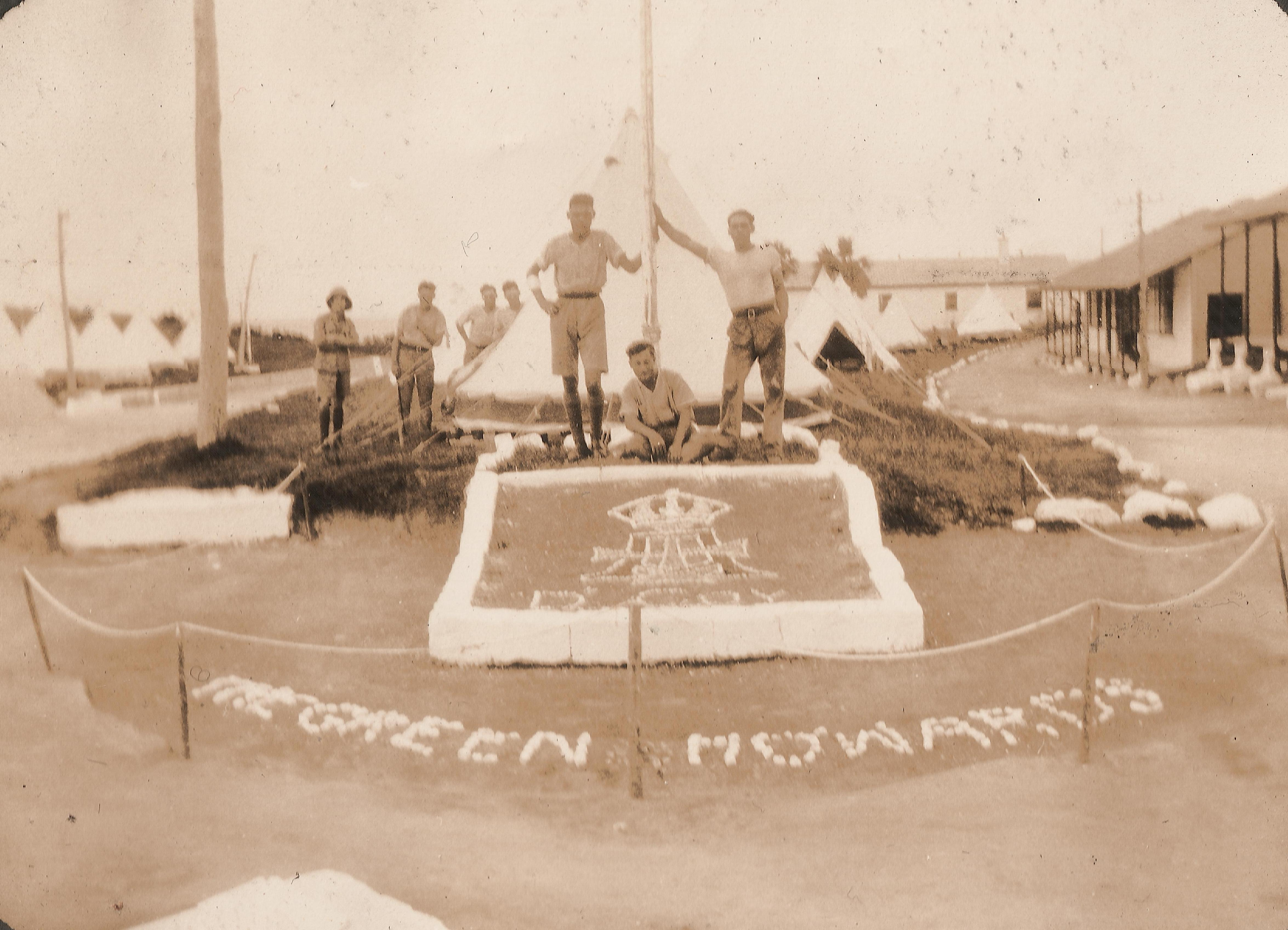
2 Battalion, Green Howards (Alexandra, Princess of Wales's Own Yorkshire Regiment) at Warwick Camp, circa 1925-1927

The base was located on a strip of land obtained during the mid-Nineteenth century by the War Office along the south shore of Warwick and Southampton, in Bermuda. The army garrison in the Imperial fortress of Bermuda was being re-organised, with the headquarters moving from St. George's to Prospect Camp, near Hamilton. Most of the Regular Army infantry relocated to Prospect Camp, also, leaving the St. George's Garrison largely in the hands of the Royal Regiment of Artillery. Prospect Camp was usefully located in the centre of the colony, and near the capital, but had no area suitable for a rifle range.

In January, 1869, F Company of the 61st (South Gloucestershire) Regiment of Foot was moved to Warwick to work on the Military Road (now, the South Shore Road), following which they constructed the rifle ranges at Warwick Camp. Two companies of the 15th Foot continued working on the road, west of Warwick Camp, and also built a new battery for the coastal artillery at Whale Bay (several older forts housing coastal artillery had existed within what became the boundaries of Warwick Camp prior to 1816).

The Camp enclosed Warwick Long Bay and Horseshoe Bay, which, today, are Bermuda's two most popular public beaches, and all the land between. The rifle ranges were placed here, on the south side of the road, and between the beaches. The Camp also included an area to the north of the road where permanent buildings were erected. No barracks were built until after the Great War, however, as the Camp had no permanent establishment of its own. Use of the camp was allotted for different periods throughout the year to any, or several, of the army units comprising the military garrison. The regular troops used the Camp for riflery and for tactical training, as did the Volunteers/Territorials (part-time soldiers), who used it for annual camps.

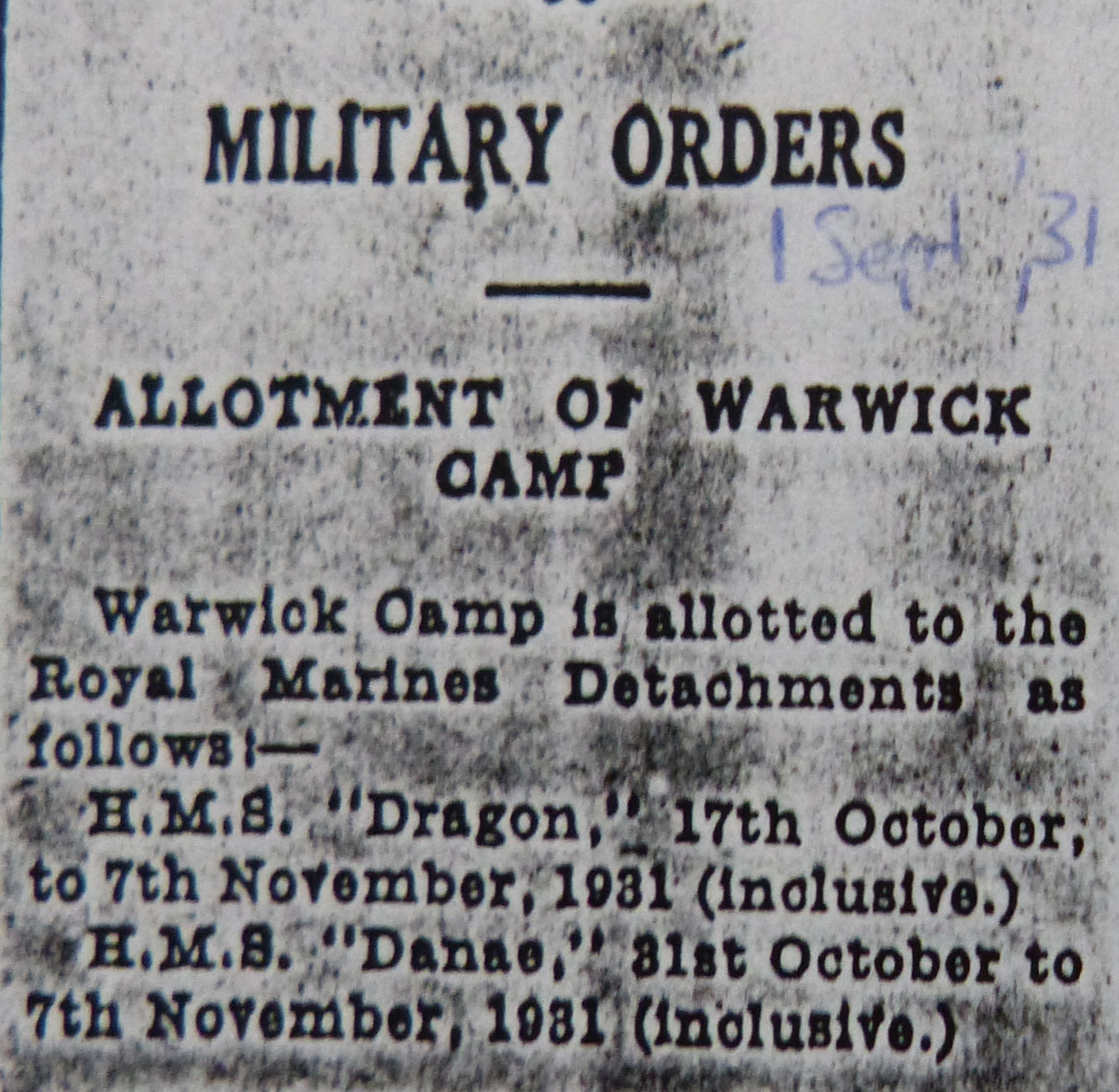
Military Orders for the allotment of Warwick Camp in October and November, 1931

The part-time units originally had no camps of their own, their sub-units being divided amongst a number of drill halls, or attached to the regular complements of coastal artillery batteries.

== First World War ==
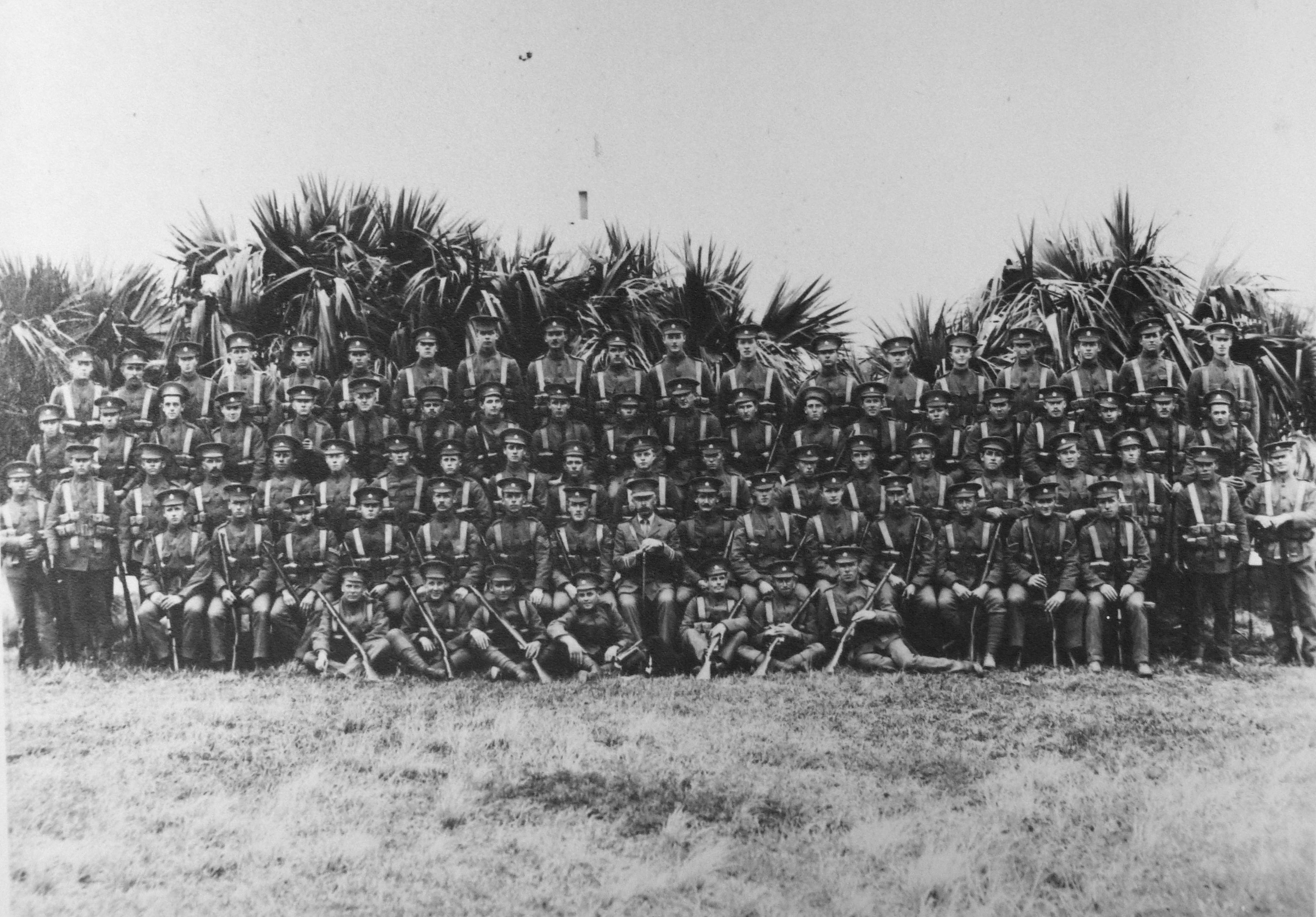
The First Contingent of the BVRC to the Lincolns, training at Warwick Camp for the Western Front. Winter 1914–15.

During the Great War, the Bermuda Militia Artillery (BMA) and the Bermuda Volunteer Rifle Corps (BVRC) were embodied in August 1914 to fulfill their wartime role on a full-time basis (the BMA, in fact, was already embodied for its annual camp). Despite their vital responsibilities to the garrison, both units soon began planning to send contingents of volunteers to the Western Front.

Nicknamed Bullock's Boys (after its Adjutant, Governor and Commander-in-Chief Major-General Sir George M. Bullock), the first of these units was raised as a detachment by the BVRC, and embodied at Warwick Camp in December, 1914. Many of its members had enlisted specifically for the Front, although others were already serving when the war began. The contingent trained full-time at Warwick Camp until it was dispatched to the Royal Lincolnshire Regiment in Europe, arriving on the Western Front in June, 1915. A second contingent was sent to the Lincolns by the BVRC the following year.

== The Second World War ==
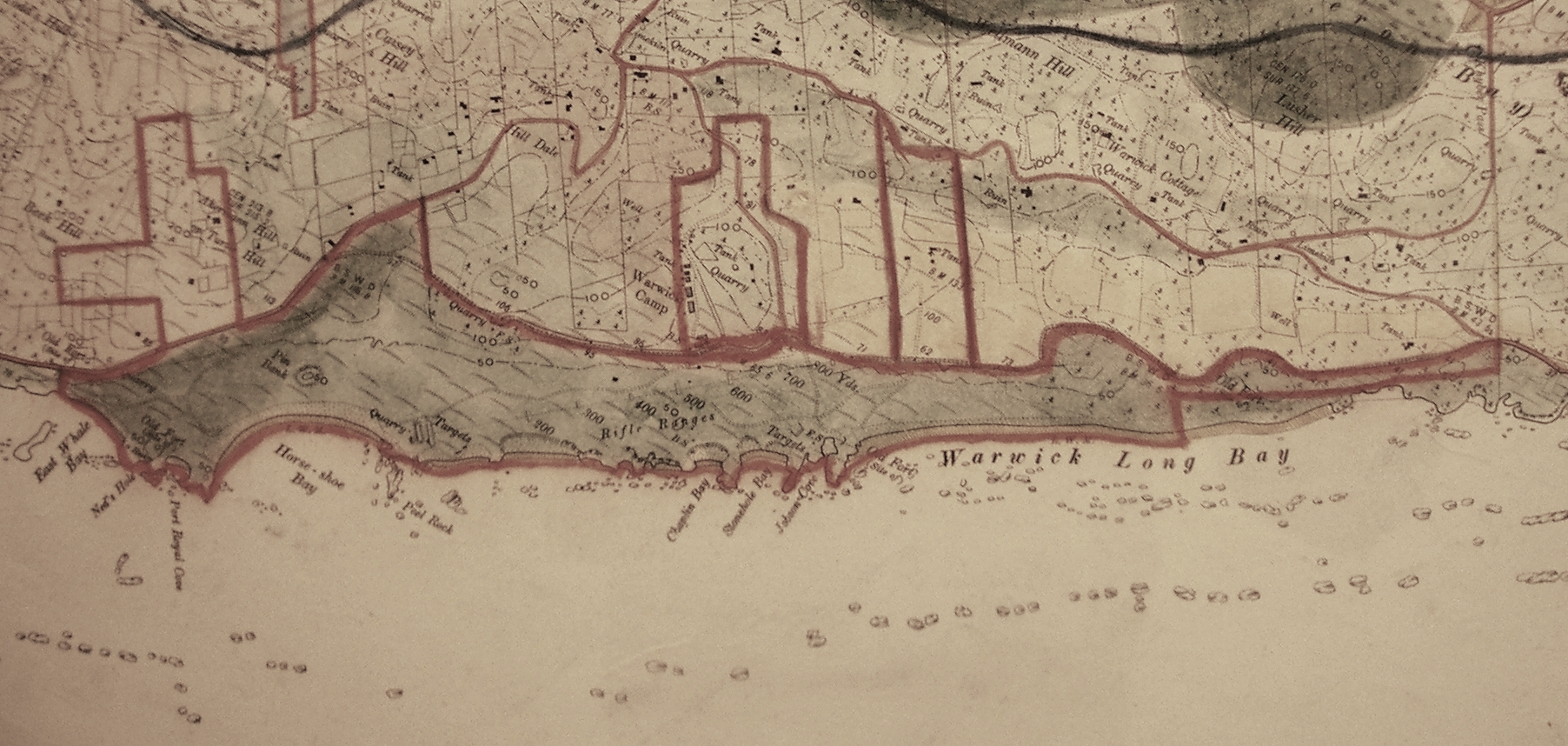
Warwick Camp, as shown on the Ordnance Survey map of Bermuda produced between 1897 and 1899 by Lieutenant Arthur Johnson Savage, Royal Engineers. The boundaries of Warwick Camp, circa 1945, have been hand-marked in red.

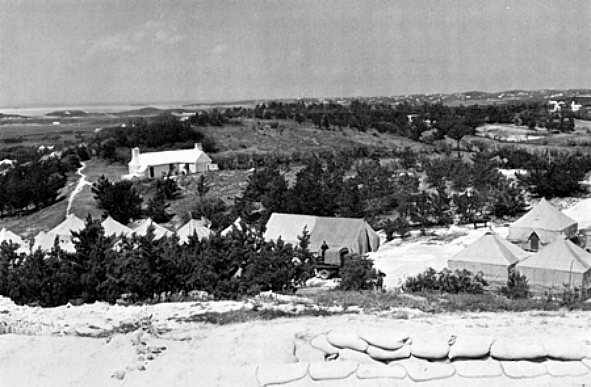
"B" Battery, 57th Coast Artillery Regiment, US Army, at Ackermann's Hill (or Turtle Hill) within Warwick Camp, Southampton, Bermuda in WWII

Between the two World Wars, barracks were built on the northern side of the Military Road. Prior to then, units training at Warwick Camp had lived under canvas. By 1939, the numerous coastal artillery installations in Bermuda had been reduced to one active battery, comprising the two 6-inch guns of the St. David's Battery, tasked in wartime as the Examination Battery, on St. David's Head. Sensing the approach of war, and realising that the dockyard, located some miles to the north of Warwick Camp, was vulnerable to naval bombardment, it was decided to build a new battery at the highest point within Warwick Camp. This comprised two 6" guns which had been lying disused in other Bermudian batteries. Both guns were refurbished, and only one was operational when local forces were mobilised on 3 September 1939. The other was fitted the following year. Although the guns of most naval ships at that time outranged the elderly 6" guns of Bermuda, it was thought that the Warwick Camp battery's position was far enough to the south of the dockyard to prevent ships coming near enough from that direction to shell it. From that location, the guns could also repel any raiding parties that attempted to cross the reefline in small boats to land on the beaches below. The last Regular artillery units had been withdrawn before the War, and the two batteries were operated by the gunners of the BMA, with the Bermuda Volunteer Engineers providing detachments to operate the search lights and provide signals. Warwick Camp continued to be used by all units in its training role, but also housed Territorial infantry units that had been embodied for the duration of the war.

Prior to the December, 1941, entry of the United States into the war, the United States Army and the United States Marines Corps were permitted to deploy forces to Bermuda, ostensibly to guard base sites to which the United States had been granted leases by the British Government, but with the intent of also allowing the neutral US to covertly reinforce the colony's defences. Among the American units deployed to Bermuda was a battery of two 155mm GPF artillery guns ("B" Battery, 57th Regiment, United States Army Coast Artillery Corps) deployed to Ackermann's Hill, on the northern side of the South Shore Road (behind Horseshoe Bay), in Southampton Parish (this part of Warwick Camp was disposed of after the war and has now been densely built-up with private housing). The two guns arrived as field guns on wheeled carriages, but were fixed on Panama Mounts by October, 1941. As with other US Army defences outside the leased baselands, this battery was withdrawn from Bermuda on the end of hostilities.

== After the Second World War ==
Following the War, the BMA and the BVRC were both reduced to skeleton command structures in 1946. The BVE, the Bermuda Militia Infantry (BMI), and the Home Guard were all disbanded. The BMA and BVRC (renamed the Bermuda Rifles) were both returned to strength in 1951, with the BVRC re-establishing itself at Warwick Camp. The Warwick Camp battery was not re-activated. The coastal artillery's reason for existence, along with that of the entire garrison, soon disappeared, however, when most of the Royal Navy's dockyard was closed in 1951, leaving only a small supply base (HMS Malabar). Following this, the last Regular Army unit (a company of the Duke of Cornwall's Light Infantry) was withdrawn in 1957. In 1953, the last battery of coastal artillery (the St. David's Battery) was removed from use, and the BMA converted to the infantry role (although continuing to wear the Royal Artillery cap badge and uniform), joining the BVRC at Warwick Camp. 1953 was also the final year in which the Imperial Defence Plan, under which the two units had been tasked, was issued. Warwick Camp was among the lands that were slated for disposal by the War Office and the Admiralty, and which were taken over by the local government.

== The Royal Bermuda Regiment ==
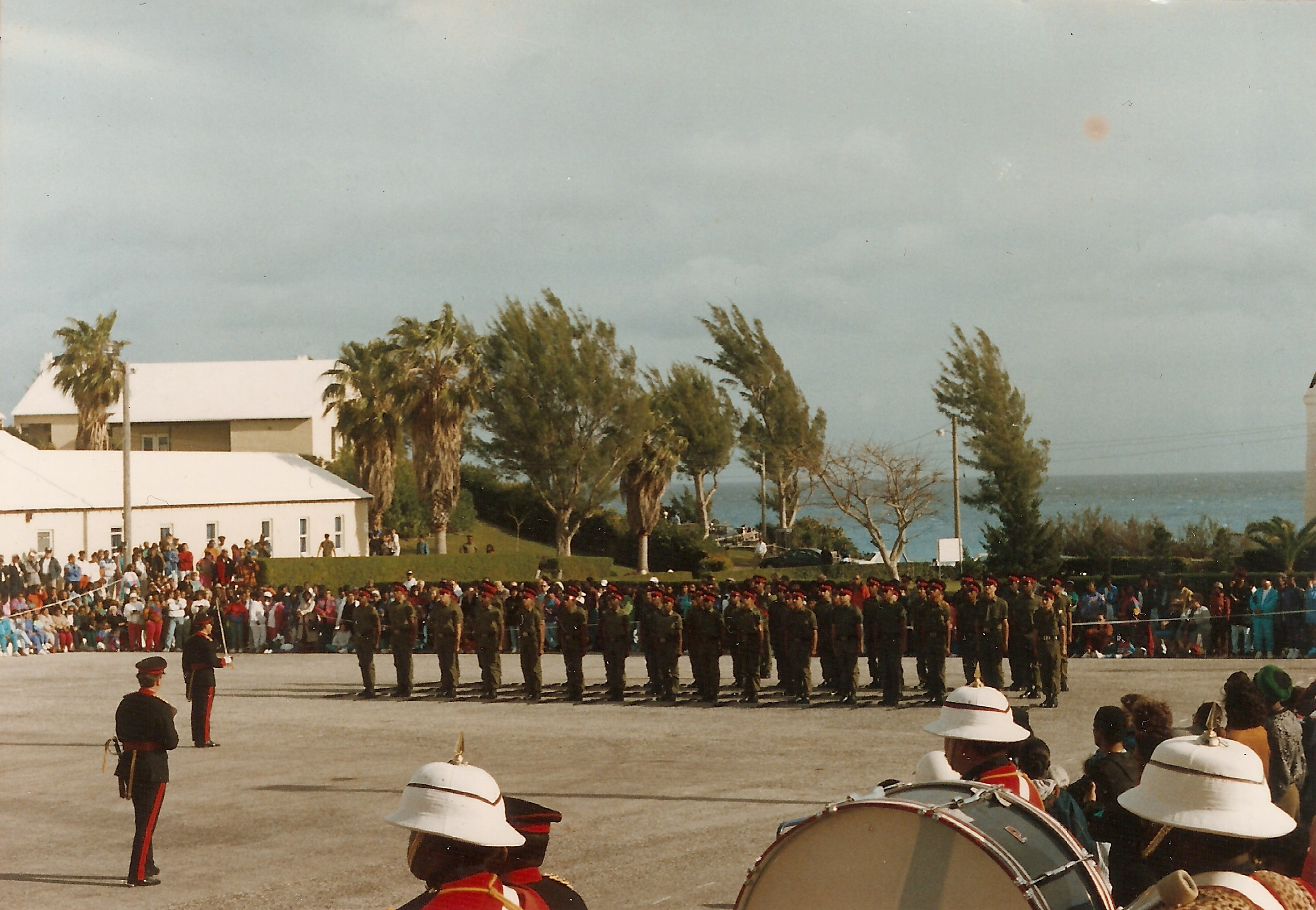
A platoon of the Training Company of the Bermuda Regiment, at Warwick Camp, during Recruit Camp 1993

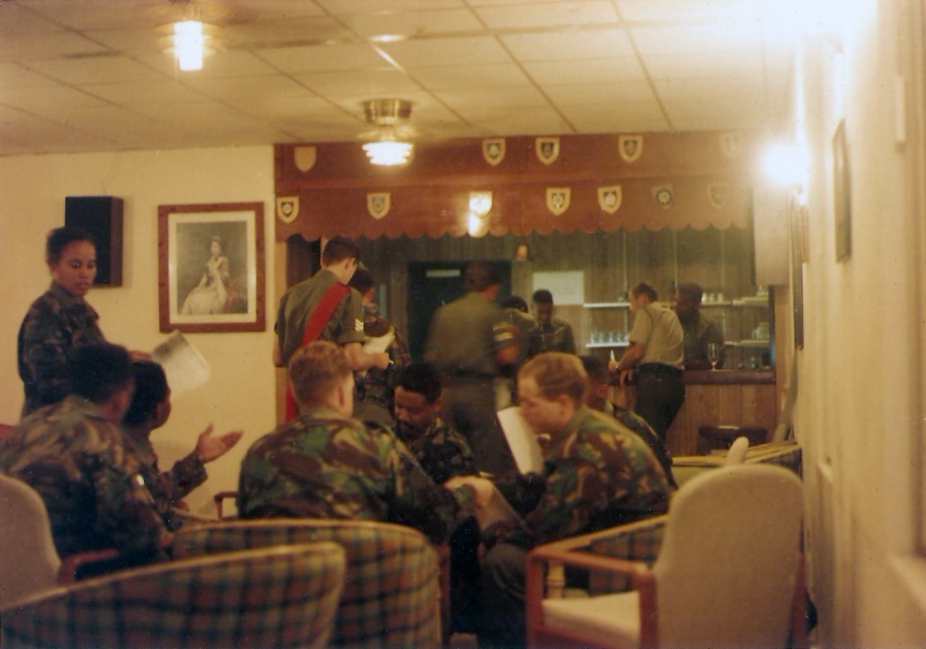
Bermuda Regiment Corporals' Mess at Warwick Camp.

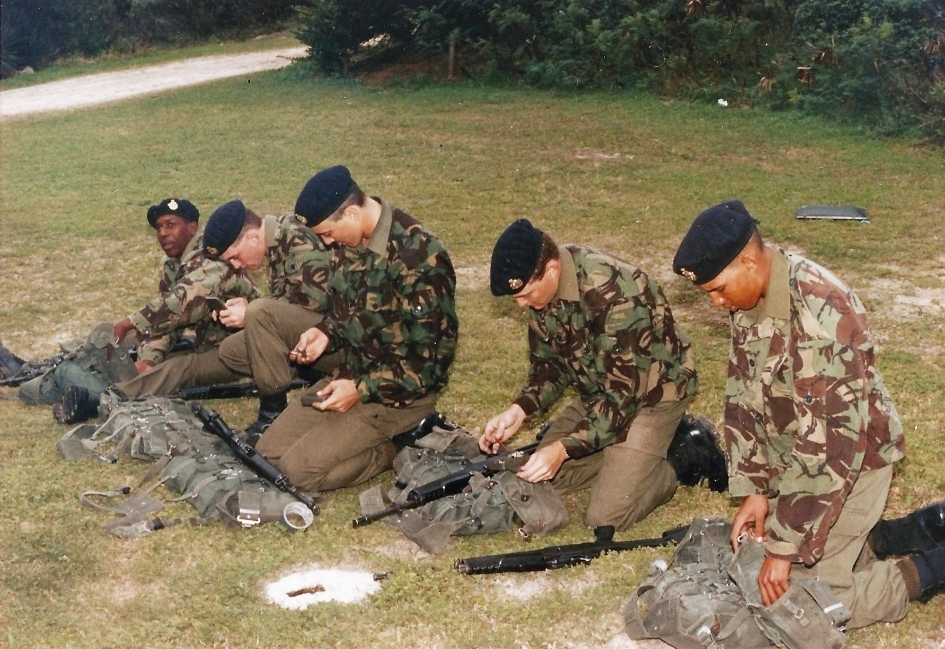
Recruits clean their rifles, prior to a shoot at Warwick Camp, during the 1994 Recruit Camp.

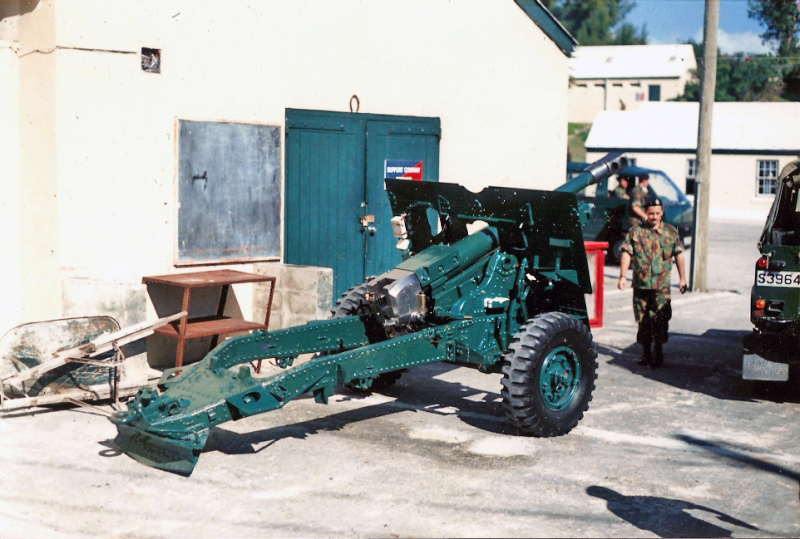
One of the two 25 Pounder (88mm) field guns of the Bermuda Regiment's ceremonial Gun Troop, at Warwick Camp.

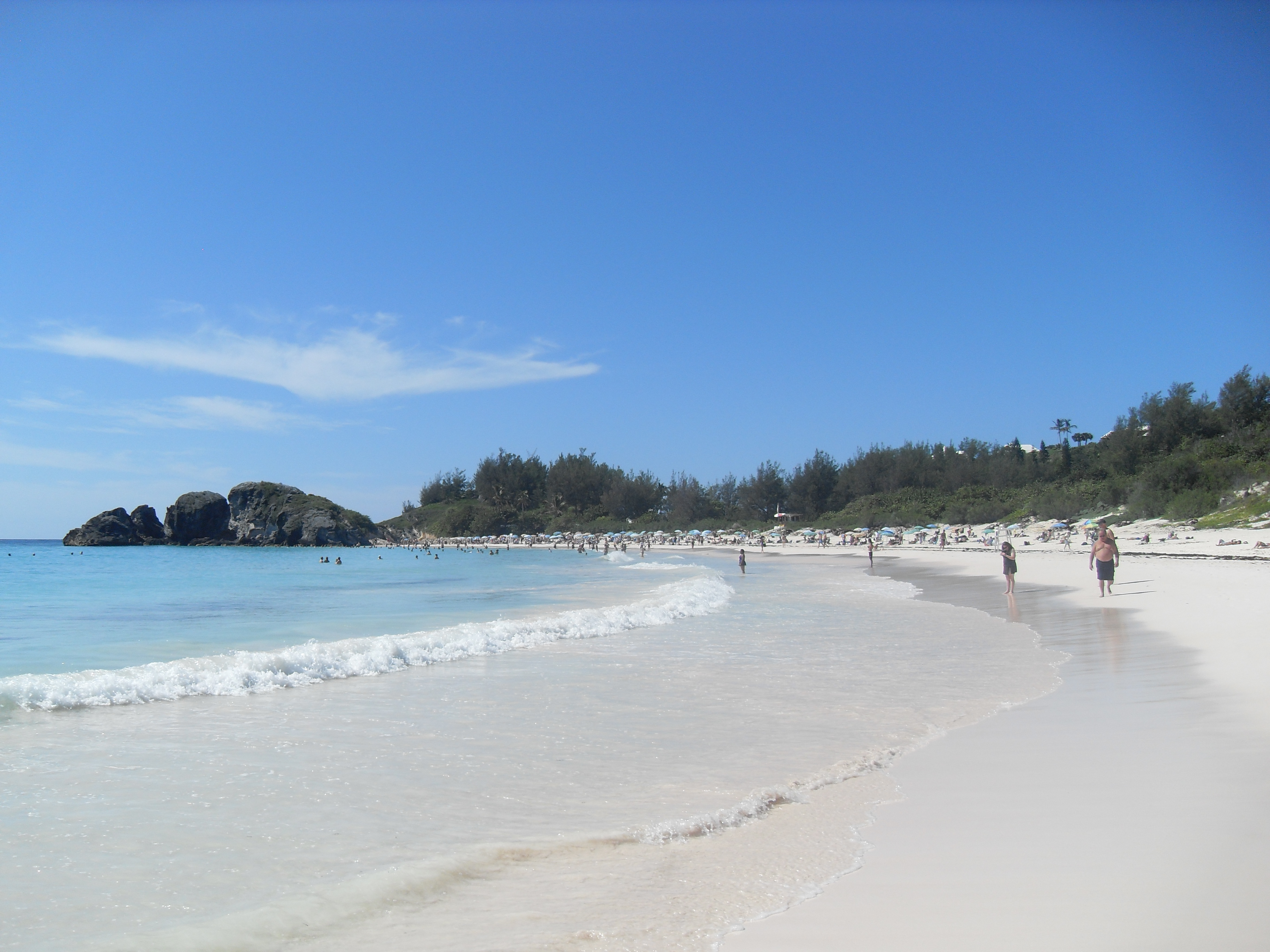
Horseshoe Bay is one of Bermuda's two most popular public beaches, both of which are located within Warwick Camp

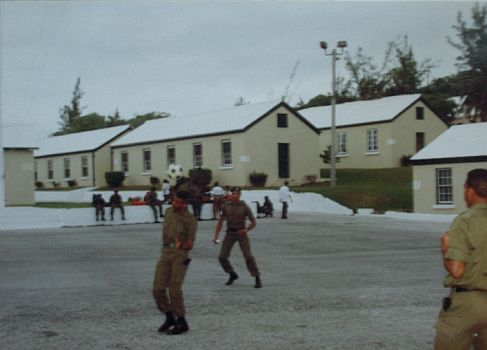
Bermuda Regiment soldiers play football on the parade ground of Warwick Camp.

With no need to contend with other units for its use, the Bermuda Rifles closed its drill halls and collected its companies together at Warwick Camp. After converting to the infantry role in 1953, the BMA operated from Warwick Camp, also. The legalisation of motor vehicles for personal use in 1948 meant that soldiers with homes or workplaces anywhere in Bermuda could easily attend training dates at Warwick Camp. In 1965, the BMA and the BVRC were amalgamated to form the Bermuda Regiment (now the Royal Bermuda Regiment).

Warwick Camp has served, since then, as the Bermuda Regiment's headquarters and only facility. This actually compares very favourably to the situation of most Territorial Army units in Britain, which still operate from drill halls, lacking barracks, rifle ranges and outdoor training areas other than small carparks that double as parade grounds. By comparison, Warwick Camp includes extensive lightly wooded and grassy areas, and full rifle ranges (fuller, in fact, than modern, sub-calibre rifles can make use of. The longest range used today is a 100 metre one, while the longest, which allows shooting at ranges of up to 800 yards, has long lain disused). There are also two 25 metre ranges - one on the south side of the road, and the other within the area enclosed by permanent buildings on the north side of the road (the South Shore Road, formerly the Military Road, which cuts through the camp, is a public thoroughfare, and the land to the south of it now doubles as public parkland). In addition to the ranges for live firing, the Camp also now has a building equipped with the Firearms Training System (FATS), allowing 'shooting' year-round in simulated combat conditions.

The Camp has twelve barrack rooms, capable of accommodating a full rifle company, with support staff. The buildings housing the Officers' Mess and the Warrant Officers' and Sergeants' Mess both have rooms to accommodate commissioned officers and senior ranks separately from the lower ranks. The Corporal's Mess uses a dedicated barracks room for social activities, but junior NCOs are accommodated with their men (although they have a separate room within each barracks). There are large shower blocks, a large mess hall, and a small PRI. Each of the companies has its own office, and a connected Company Quartermaster (Sergeant's) Stores (CQMS Stores). The Regimental Headquarters is located in its own building, which also contains the armoury. The magazine for small arms, and other, ammunition is the actual magazine of the coastal artillery battery, the two 6" guns of which are still rusting atop the hill. There are separate buildings for the Regimental Quartermaster's Stores, Internal Security Stores, and for the Training Wing. There is space for the indoor storage of the two field guns of the Bermuda Regiment's ceremonial Gun Troop. There is also sufficient space for parking numerous vehicles, and for the storage of the Boat Troops rigid-hulled power boats. At the rear of the Camp, there is a small guard room, and several houses which are used to accommodate the Permanent Staff Instructors and other personnel seconded from the Regular Army, with their families. Behind the barracks is an assault course with a variety of obstacles. The last feature of Warwick Camp is a large parade ground, which is an important consideration, given the Bermuda Regiment's ceremonial commitments.

The facilities available at Warwick Camp, and its use by all elements of the Royal Bermuda Regiment, mean that each rifle company is able to carry out virtually all types of training, from section battle drills, to range work, to IS training, on any given drill night or weekend Camp.
