= Royal Air Force, Bermuda (1939–1945) =

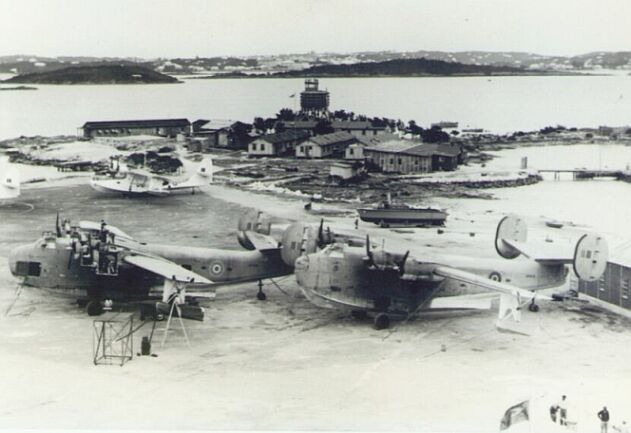
RAF Darrell's Island during World War II.

The Royal Air Force (RAF) operated from two locations in the Imperial fortress colony of Bermuda during the Second World War. Bermuda's location had made it an important naval station since US independence, and, with the advent of the aeroplane, had made it as important to trans-Atlantic aviation in the decades before the Jet Age. The limited, hilly land mass had prevented the construction of an airfield, but, with most large airliners in the 1930s being flying boats, this was not initially a limitation.

The government-owned Imperial Airways built a flying-boat station on Darrell's Island that served as an airport for passengers flying to and from Bermuda, as well as on trans-Atlantic flights staging through the Island.

== World War II ==
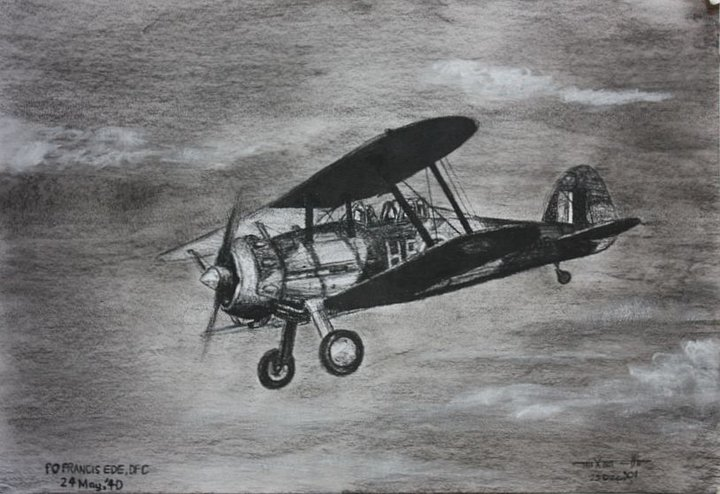
Artist's impression of the Gloster Gladiator flown by Bermudian Flying Officer Herman Francis Grant "Baba" Ede, DFC on the 24th May, 1940, during the Battle of Norway

Between World War I and World War II, the Royal Air Force (RAF) had absorbed the Royal Naval Air Service and assumed responsibility for operating the Royal Navy's Fleet Air Arm (FAA). From 1933, an RAF Coastal Command detachment operating from the wharf at the HM Dockyard, on Ireland Island, was responsible for the maintenance of the aeroplanes carried by the cruisers based at the Bermuda, which belonged to the Fleet Air Arm's No. 443 Fleet Spotter-Reconnaissance Flight (which was administered by RAF Coastal Command), starting with HMS Norfolk. Flight Lieutenant Thomas H. Moon was appointed for duty with R.A.F. Detachment Bermuda with effect from 23 January 1934.

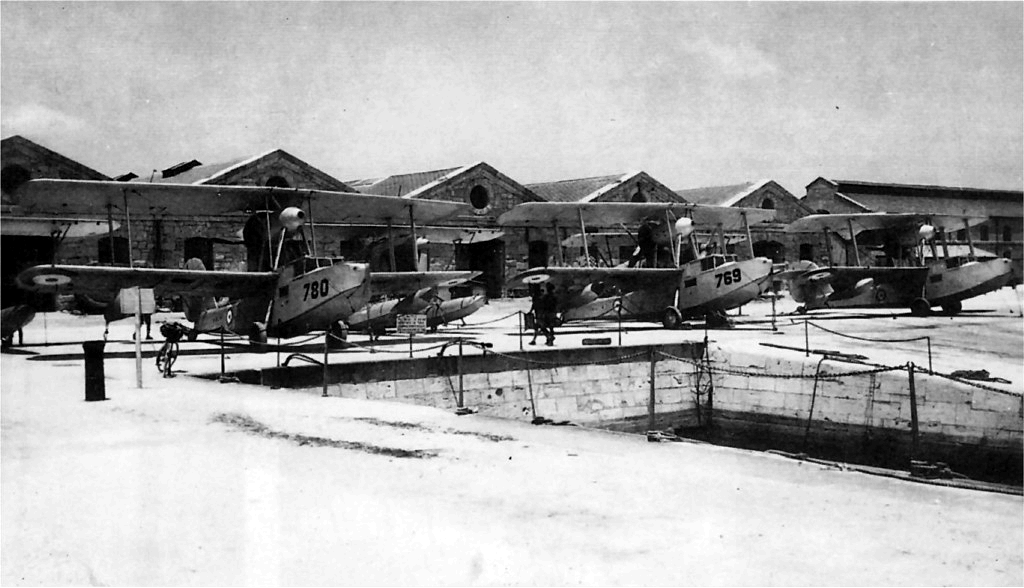
Walrus and Seafox seaplanes at the original Royal Air Force-operated naval air station in the North Yard of HM Dockyard Bermuda, in 1938

This detachment also held aeroplanes in store, crated in parts. When an aeroplane could not be repaired, another was assembled as a replacement. In 1939, with the rest of the Fleet Air Arm, this was transferred to the Royal Navy, which relocated the naval air station to Boaz Island.

With the commencement of hostilities in 1939, Darrell's Island was taken over as a Royal Air Force station, with two commands operating on it. RAF Transport Command operated large, multi-engined flying boats, carrying freight and passengers between Europe and the Americas. RAF Ferry Command was responsible for delivering aircraft from manufacturers to operational units. As the requirements of the RAF and Fleet Air Arm could not be filled by the output of British factories, the Air Ministry placed orders with manufacturers in the neutral USA for all manner of aircraft. These included flying boats, like the PBY Catalina, which, designed for long-range maritime patrols, were capable of being flown across the Atlantic, albeit in stages.

Imperial Airways, which had become the British Overseas Airways Corporation (BOAC), continued to operate in Bermuda throughout the War, as well, though in a war-role, with its new Boeing flying boats painted in camouflage. Its flying boats landed trans-Atlantic mail at Darrell's to be cleared by the British counter-intelligence censors at the Princess Hotel. In January, 1942, Prime Minister Winston Churchill visited Bermuda on his return to Britain, following December 1941 meetings in Washington D.C., with US President Franklin Roosevelt, in the weeks after the Japanese attack on Pearl Harbor. Churchill flew into Darrell's Island on a BOAC Boeing 314. Although it had been planned to continue the journey by ship, he made an impulsive decision to complete it by a direct flight from Bermuda to England, marking the first trans-Atlantic air crossing by a national leader.

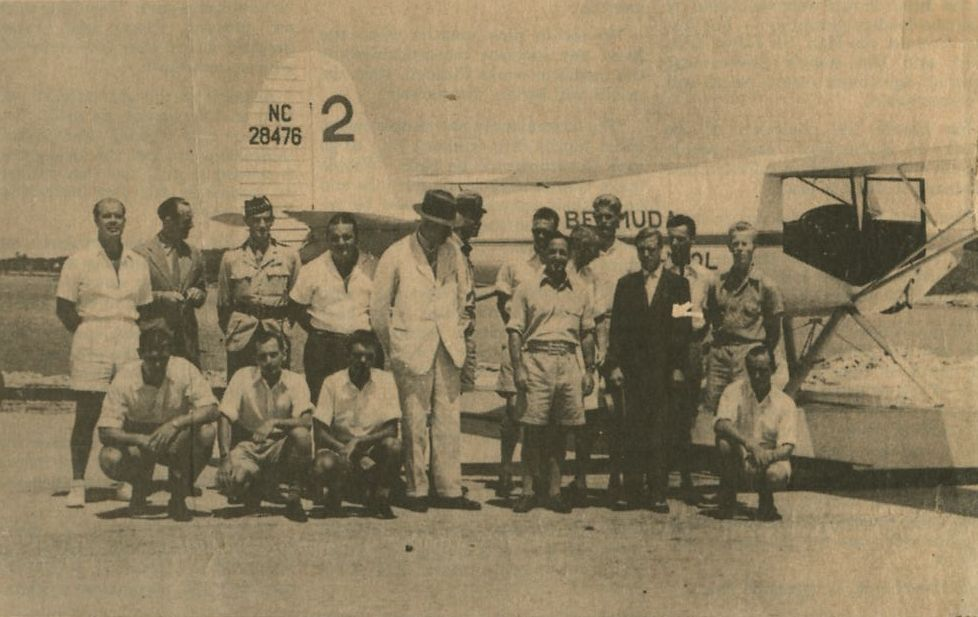
Edward, Duke of Windsor visits the Bermuda Flying School in 1940 pictured in front of a Luscombe 8 Silvaire floatplane.

The first Bermudian killed in the Second World War was Flying Officer Grant Ede, a No. 263 Squadron RAF Gladiator pilot who took part in the 1940 Battle of Norway, before dying along with almost everyone else aboard HMS Glorious when it was sunk during the evacuation from Norway.

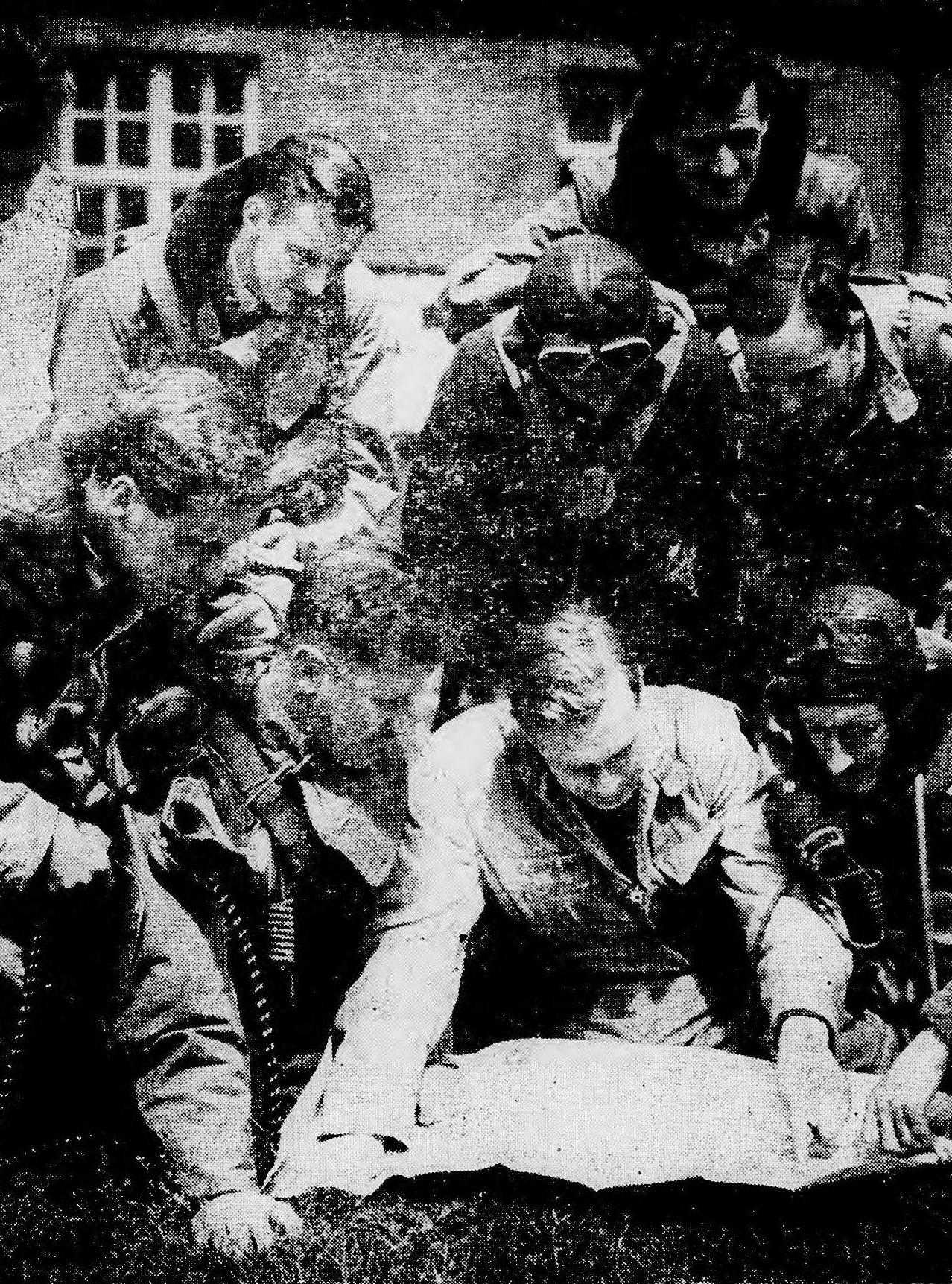
Bermudian Flying Officer Herman Francis Grant Ede DFC and other RAF pilots

In 1940, the Bermuda Flying School was established on Darrell's Island with the goal of training pilots for the Royal Air Force and the Royal Navy (RN). The school trained volunteers from the local territorial units using Luscombe seaplanes. Those who passed their training were sent to the Air Ministry to be assigned to the RAF or the Royal Navy's Fleet Air Arm (FAA). The Commanding Officer of the school was Major Cecil Montgomery-Moore, DFC, who was also the commander of the Bermuda Volunteer Engineers (BVE). He had left the Bermuda Volunteer Rifle Corps (BVRC) to become one of at least eighteen Bermudian aviators of the Great War. The school trained eighty pilots before an excess of trained pilots led to its closure in 1942. The body administrating it was adapted to become a recruiting organisation (the Bermuda Flying Committee) for the Royal Canadian Air Force (RCAF), sending sixty aircrew candidates, and twenty-two female candidates for ground-based roles, to that service before the War's end. With so many Bermudians entering the air services, the Air Training Corps was established in Bermuda during the war to train school-aged cadets (although, today there are only army and naval cadet corps in Bermuda).

In addition to the BFS graduates and BFC candidates, other Bermudians entered the air services during the war. These included at least two other Great War aviators who returned to service, Squadron Leaders Rowe Spurling and Bernard Logier Wilkinson, who served with RAF Transport Command and the RCAF, respectively. An officer of the BVE, Richard Gorham, transferred to the Royal Artillery, attaching to the RAF as an air observation post (AOP) pilot, directing artillery fire from the air. He played a decisive role in the Battle of Monte Cassino.

In 1940, extending upon an agreement made secretly before Britain's declaration of war in 1939, the USA was given 99-year free base rights in Bermuda, and began construction of a Naval Air Station, the Naval Operating Base (NOB), for flying boats, and an airfield for landplanes. The terms of the agreement were that the US-built airfield, on British territory, would be a joint US Army/Royal Air Force base. When the airfield (named Kindley Field after an American aviator who had fought for Britain during World War I) became operational in 1943, RAF Transport Command relocated to it, taking over the West end of the base in Castle Harbour.

With the entry of the USA into the War, at the end of 1941, the US Navy began operating air-patrols from the Island. Bermuda was a forming-up point, during the War, for convoys numbering hundreds of ships. Despite the importance of guarding against Axis submarines and surface raiders operating in the area, the RAF had not posted a Coastal Command detachment to maintain air cover. The Fleet Air Arm operated ad hoc patrols from its base RNAS Bermuda (the personnel of which were carried on the books of HMS Malabar) on Boaz Island. This was a repair facility which had several aeroplanes on hand, but no aircrew at the start of the war. It operated its patrols using pilots from ships at the Dockyard on Ireland Island, and RAF and Bermuda Flying School pilots from Darrell's Island. These patrols ceased in 1941 with the arrival of a US Navy patrol squadron, which operated from Darrell's Island until the US NOB became operable.

The RAF operated from its two facilities in Bermuda until the end of the War, when both Commands withdrew their detachments. Darrell's Island reverted to its pre-War role as a civil airport, until the replacement of flying boats as trans-Atlantic airliners by land-planes, like the Lancastrian, the Tudor, and DC4, led to its closure in 1948.

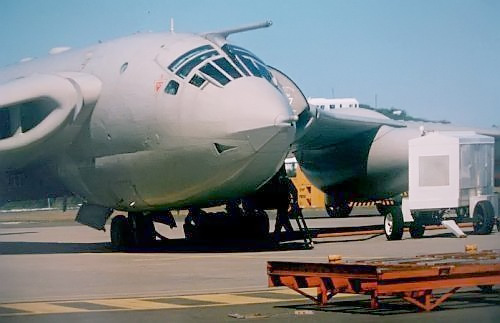
RAF Victor XM717 at the Civil Air Terminal on the former US NAS Bermuda ca. 1985. XM717 took part in the first mission of Operation Black Buck during the Falklands War.

== Post War activities ==
The senior RAF officer in Bermuda, during the War, Wing Commander E.M. "Mo" Ware, was loaned to the civil government to oversee the conversion of the RAF's end of the military airfield into a Civil Air Terminal. Pre-fabricated buildings were relocated from Darrell's Island to assemble the first terminal. Ware remained with the local government after leaving the RAF, becoming the Director of Civil Aviation for many years.

Although no longer maintaining any detachment in Bermuda, the RAF has continued to use the Island as a trans-Atlantic staging post since the War. Whereas most foreign military aircraft passing through the Island had used the US military end of the airfield, the RAF had continued to disperse its aeroplanes at the former RAF end of the field. Large detachments of tactical aircraft, accompanied by larger refuelling, transport, and maritime patrol aeroplanes, regularly staged at the island on transits between the UK and the garrison at Belize, or bombing ranges on US bases.

== See also ==
- Military of Bermuda
- Royal Naval Air Station Bermuda at Boaz Island
- USAAF, Kindley Field 1941–1948/USAF Kindley AFB, 1948–1970
- United States Naval Air Station Bermuda (formerly Kindley AFB), 1970–1995
- USN Naval Operating Base/Naval Air Station Bermuda/NAS Bermuda Annex, Morgans Point, 1941–1995
