= Bermuda Militia (1612–1815) =

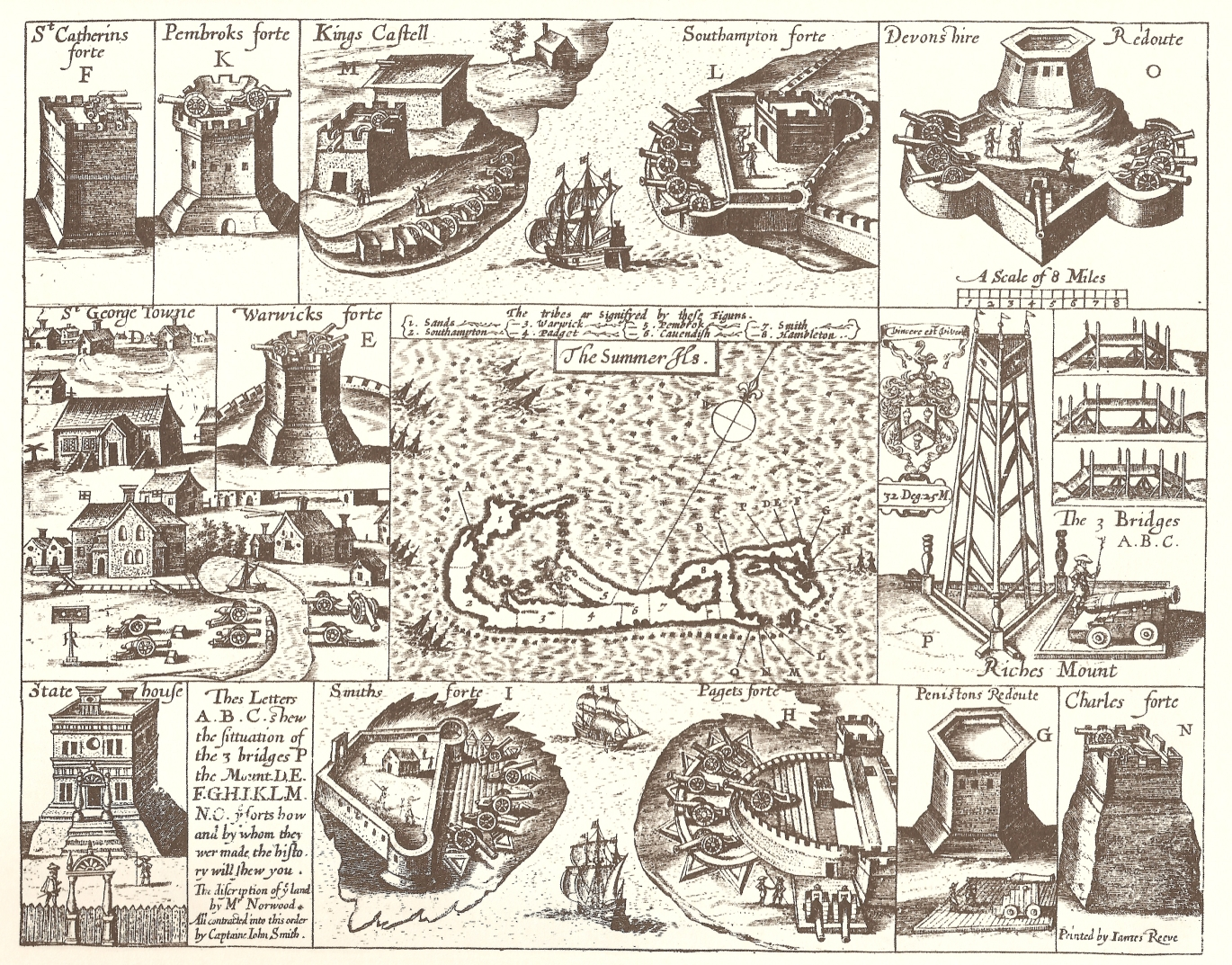
Captain John Smith's 1624 map of Bermuda, showing contemporary fortifications.

Bermuda has organised several different forms of militia between the 1612 and 1815. The roles of the militias included defence of the colony in complement with the activities of the British Army and Royal Navy.

== History ==
Bermuda was settled inadvertently, in 1609, by the Virginia Company. Its first deliberate settlers arrived in 1612, aboard the Plough. The very first concern of the first Governor, Richard Moore, was the Colony's defences against an expected Spanish attack. He oversaw the immediate construction of fortifications around St. George's and Castle Harbour, and raised militias to man the defences. The military defences would remain wholly the responsibility of the Colonial Government until an independent company of army soldiers was garrisoned in Bermuda from 1701. The Colonial Militia included bodies of artillery, infantry, and mounted troops. After American independence, the Royal Navy began building up a base on Bermuda. This resulted in a parallel build-up of the British Army's Bermuda Garrison, intended to protect the naval base. Bermuda's militias had long suffered from the Colony's maritime industry, which ensured that much of its useful manpower was always away, at sea. With the increase in the number of regular soldiers, the Islanders lost what interest they had in maintaining militias. By the time the United States declared war in 1812, the Bermudian militia had become moribund, with the last, 1802, Militia Act having been allowed to lapse. An Act was rushed through, as a war-time expediency, in 1813, but the militia was allowed to lapse again after the War's end in 1815. The British Government made repeated pleas for Militia to be maintained, but, other than short-lived militias raised by the Governor, or the Royal Navy, without an Act, or the funding, of the Colonial Parliament, no part-time Bermudian units would be raised until the formation of Volunteer Army units in 1895.

Bermudians also raised militias from the seasonal population on the Turks Islands, which Bermuda had effective control of from about 1681 until the British government assigned them to the Bahamas at the end of the Eighteenth Century. Spanish and French forces seized the Turks in 1706, but Bermudian forces expelled them four years later in what was probably Bermuda's only independent military action.

- Bermuda Militia 1612-1687
- Bermuda Militia 1687-1813
- Bermuda Militia 1813

== See also ==
- Bermuda Militia Infantry

== Bibliography ==
- Defence, Not Defiance: A History Of The Bermuda Volunteer Rifle Corps, Jennifer M. Ingham (now Jennifer M. Hind), The Island Press Ltd., Pembroke, Bermuda. ISBN 0-9696517-1-6
- The Andrew And The Onions: The Story Of The Royal Navy In Bermuda, 1795 – 1975, Lt. Commander Ian Strannack, The Bermuda Maritime Museum Press, The Bermuda Maritime Museum, P.O. Box MA 133, Mangrove Bay, Bermuda MA BX. ISBN 978-0-921560-03-6
- Bermuda Forts 1612–1957, Dr. Edward C. Harris, The Bermuda Maritime Museum Press, The Bermuda Maritime Museum. ISBN 978-0-921560-11-1
- Bulwark Of Empire: Bermuda's Fortified Naval Base 1860-1920, Lt.-Col. Roger Willock, USMC, The Bermuda Maritime Museum Press, The Bermuda Maritime Museum. ISBN 978-0-921560-00-5
- Bermuda From Sail To Steam: The History Of The Island From 1784 to 1901, Dr. Henry Wilkinson, Oxford University Press. ISBN 978-0-19-215932-8
