= Arthur Spurling =

Bermudan infantryman and aviator during the First World War

- Born: 19 May 1896; Bermuda
- Died: 1984; Surrey, England
- Military career
- Allegiance: United Kingdom
- Branch: British Army
- Service years: 1915–1919; 1939–1945
- Rank: Squadron Leader
- Units: Bermuda Volunteer Rifle Corps; Lincolnshire Regiment; No. 49 Squadron RAF
- Conflicts: First World War
- Awards: Distinguished Flying Cross

Arthur Rowe Spurling, DFC (19 May 1896 – 1984) was a Bermudian who served during the First World War as an infantryman and an aviator, becoming an ace credited with six aerial victories. He later served as a ferry pilot during the Second World War.

== Early life ==
Spurling was born into a prominent Bermudian family in Hamilton, in the British colony of Bermuda, on 19 May 1896.

== First World War ==
When the United Kingdom declared war on the Central Powers in August 1914, the part-time volunteer army units in Bermuda, the Bermuda Volunteer Rifle Corps (BVRC) and the Bermuda Militia Artillery (BMA), were mobilised. Although required to fulfil their roles as part of the Bermuda Garrison, both units immediately proposed sending drafts to the Western Front. The BVRC formed a detachment in December 1914, which was to train in Bermuda over the winter before being dispatched across the Atlantic. This contingent was composed of volunteers who were already serving, as well as those who enlisted specifically for the Front. Spurling volunteered for the contingent in February 1915. The contingent trained at Warwick Camp through the winter and spring.

The contingent, consisting of Captain Richard Tucker and 88 other ranks, left Bermuda for England on 7 May 1915, travelling to Canada, then crossing the Atlantic in company with a much larger Canadian draft. It had been hoped that the contingent could be attached to the Second Battalion of The Lincolnshire Regiment (2 Lincolns), which had been on Garrison in Bermuda when the War began. When the contingent arrived at the Lincolns depot in Grimsby, the 2nd Battalion was already in France and it was attached to 1 Lincolns, instead. Captain Tucker carried written instructions from the War Office that ensured that they remained together as a unit, under their own badge. Despite this, the riflemen were given regimental numbers by the Lincolns, Spurling's being 3/17150 (his old BVRC number was 989).

The contingent arrived in France on 23 June, the first colonial volunteer unit to reach the Front, as two extra platoons attached to a company of 1 Lincolns, and remained as such until the following summer, by when its strength had been too reduced by casualties to compose even a single platoon, having lost 50% of its remaining strength at Gueudecourt on 25 September 1916. The survivors were merged on 17 October 1916, with the 33 men of a Second Contingent of the BVRC, newly arrived from Bermuda, and all were retrained as Lewis gunners.

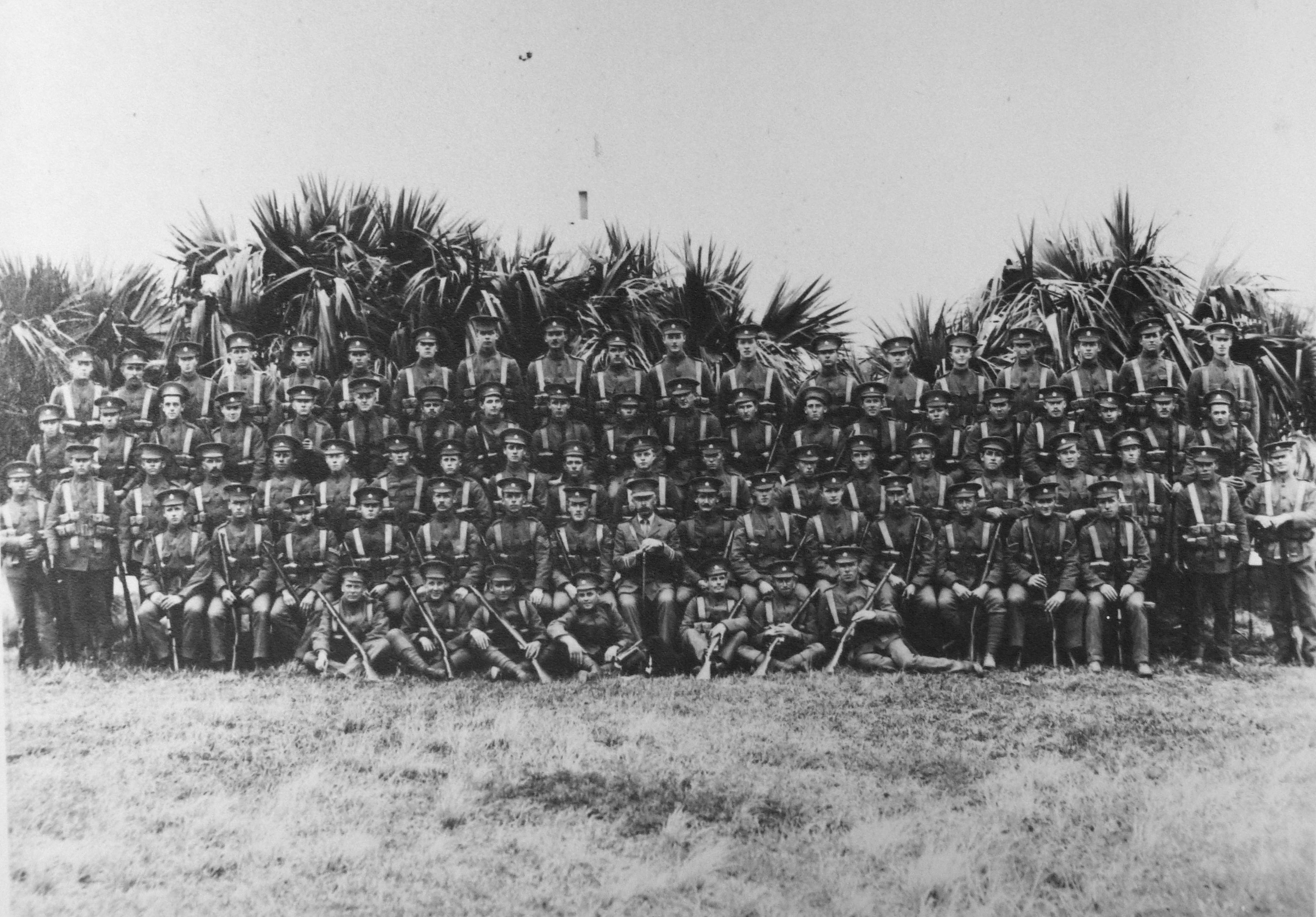
The First Contingent of the BVRC to the Lincolns, training in Bermuda for the Western Front, Winter 1914–15. Rfn. A.R. Spurling, front row, second from the left.

Rifleman Spurling was twice wounded in 1916: in the hand on 3 July, and in the foot on 13 July (when he reported he was also "buried for a few hours"). In July 1917, he received a commission in the Royal Flying Corps (RFC), one of sixteen BVRC enlisted men who would become officers while serving in France. Newly commissioned officers were not obliged to return to their original units, but could choose to join any of the regiments or corps of the British Army. Spurling was one of two who chose to join the RFC, the air arm of the British Army (the other was Henry Joseph Watlington), although more than a dozen other Bermudians would reach the RFC by different routes (including another BVRC rifleman, later Major Cecil Montgomery-Moore, who detached from the Corps in Bermuda, and Second Lieutenant Lennock de Graaf Godet, who had left his studies at the University of Oxford with the declaration of war).

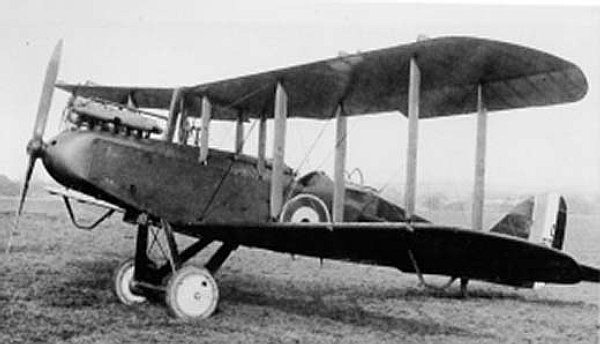
Rowe Spurling flew the DH.9 light bomber.

Second Lieutenant Spurling trained as a pilot at the Royal Flying Corps School of Instruction at Hendon Aerodrome and joined No. 89 Squadron RFC on 30 August 1917. He was posted to No. 49 Squadron RAF in July 1918, flying the Airco DH.9, a light bomber with two crew members (a pilot and an observer who doubled as a defensive gunner). By then, the Royal Flying Corps had merged with the Royal Naval Air Service on 1 April 1918 to create the independent Royal Air Force (RAF), to which service Spurling now belonged.

On 23 August 1918, Spurling was returning from a bombing mission when he became separated from his formation. Thinking he was over the British lines, he prepared to land on a German airfield near Lens which he mistook for his own, but was attacked by a German Fokker D.VII fighter. He then saw a formation of thirty more Fokkers. Despite the disadvantages of his flying a bomber and being vastly outnumbered, Spurling dived through the centre of the formation, shooting down one machine in flames; two others were seen to be in a spin, one of which crashed. Five of them then closed on his machine, but by skillful manoeuvring Spurling enabled his observer, Sergeant Frank Bell, to shoot down two of these in flames. These five victories immediately made Spurling an ace in a day. It was for this action that Spurling was awarded the Distinguished Flying Cross and Sergeant Bell was awarded the Distinguished Flying Medal. Two days later, Spurling shot down another D.VII over Mont Notre Dame.

== Second World War ==
After the First World War, Spurling returned to civil life in Bermuda. During the Second World War, he returned to the RAF, reaching the rank of Squadron Leader. He served in RAF Transport Command, which was, among other things, responsible for trans-Atlantic delivery of cargo and personnel. This was one of two RAF commands operating in Bermuda (from RAF Darrell's Island, and Kindley Field), which had been an important staging point since the start of trans-Atlantic aviation. During this war, Spurling was credited with identifying a Nazi spy in Canada.

== Post-war ==
After the Second World War, Spurling returned again to civilian life. He married Ilys Darrell in 1948, and operated a taxi fleet and the Rowe Spurling Paint Company Ltd which still exists.

Spurling and Ilys moved to Guernsey in the 1970s. They planned to return to Bermuda, but he developed Alzheimer's disease, and died in a nursing home in England in 1984. His body was returned to Bermuda for a funeral at the Anglican Cathedral and he is buried in Pembroke Parish.

Spurling's decorations with supporting documentation were sold for £12,650 at Warwick and Warwick auction house in England in 1989.

== Bibliography ==
- Defence, Not Defiance: A History of the Bermuda Volunteer Rifle Corps, Jennifer M. Ingham (now Jennifer M. Hind), The Island Press Ltd., Pembroke, Bermuda, ISBN 0-9696517-1-6
- The History of The Lincolnshire Regiment: 1914–1918, Edited by Major-General C.R. Simpson, C.B. The Medici Society, London. 1931.
- The Andrew and the Onions: The Story of the Royal Navy in Bermuda, 1795–1975, Lt Commander Ian Strannack, The Bermuda Maritime Museum Press, The Bermuda Maritime Museum, P.O. Box MA 133, Mangrove Bay, Bermuda MA BX. ISBN 0-921560-03-6
- Bermuda Forts 1612–1957, Dr Edward C. Harris, The Bermuda Maritime Museum Press, The Bermuda Maritime Museum, ISBN 0-921560-11-7
- Bulwark of Empire: Bermuda's Fortified Naval Base 1860–1920, Lt-Col. Roger Willock, USMC, The Bermuda Maritime Museum Press, The Bermuda Maritime Museum, ISBN 0-921560-00-1
- That's My Bloody Plane, by Major Cecil Montgomery-Moore, DFC, and Peter Kilduff. 1975. The Pequot Press, Chester, Connecticut. ISBN 0-87106-057-4.
