= Richard Gorham =

Bermudian politician (1917–2006)

Sir Richard Masters Gorham
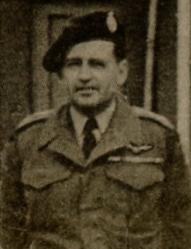
- Captain Gorham in London in Bermuda Rifles uniform for 1953 Coronation
- Born: 3 October 1917; Pembroke, Bermuda
- Died: 8 July 2006 (aged 88)
- Education: Saltus Grammar School; Ridley College
- Spouse: Barbara Tredick Dimmick McIntire (m. 1948)
- Children: Christine Dimmick Gorham Cox; Tredick R. T. Gorham; Arthur J. Gorham; Anthony M. M. Gorham
- Relatives: Robin Auchincloss Sedgwick (step-daughter); Betty Kitson (sister); Joan Wilkie (sister)

Colonel Sir Richard Masters Gorham CBE, DFC, JP (3 October 1917 – 8 July 2006) was a prominent Bermudian parliamentarian, businessman and philanthropist, who served as a pilot during the Second World War when he played a decisive role in the Battle of Monte Cassino, earning the Distinguished Flying Cross.

== Second World War ==
=== Bermuda Volunteer Engineers ===
Born in Pembroke, Bermuda, the son of Mr. and Mrs. A. J. Gorham, he enlisted in the Bermuda Volunteer Engineers in 1938. The unit was mobilised, along with the other part-time units of the Bermuda Garrison (the Bermuda Militia Artillery (BMA), Bermuda Volunteer Rifle Corps (BVRC), and the Bermuda Militia Infantry), when the Second World War was declared. As a corporal, he was attached to the signalling division at the Royal Naval Dockyard and earned a commission as a result of his saving an exercise when he suggested an emergency method of signalling visually to replace a broken Wireless transmitter.

=== Bermuda Militia Artillery ===
Gorham was commissioned as a second lieutenant into the Bermuda Militia Artillery on 20 December 1940, to replace Second Lieutenant Francis J. Gosling, who had trained as a pilot at the Bermuda Flying School and was to depart for the United Kingdom in January for transfer to the Royal Air Force. Gorham would serve only briefly with the unit before following Gosling across the Atlantic. He learnt of an instruction from the Army Council that prevented commanding officers from barring officers under their command from taking any training course for which they volunteered (although his former BVE commanding officer, Major Cecil Montgomery-Moore, DFC – having transferred from the BVRC in France to the Royal Flying Corps when he had been commissioned during the First World War, and heading the Bermuda Flying School during the Second World War – must undoubtedly have approved of what Gorham intended).

=== Royal Artillery and Royal Air Force ===
At the time, the Royal Air Force was having great difficulty in providing effective air observation post pilots to the British Army. In 1918, the British Army lost its air wing when the Royal Flying Corps was merged with the Royal Naval Air Service to create the independent Royal Air Force (RAF). Since then, the RAF had jealously guarded its monopoly on British military and naval aviation. They provided the Royal Navy with RAF aircrew and support personnel to operate the aircraft of the Fleet Air Arm, although the Navy had been allowed to begin training its own aircrew before the war began. The RAF also provided the aircraft and crews that worked in close support roles to the Army, notably the AOP pilots. These were pilots of light aircraft, such as the Auster, who acted as artillery spotters, directing the fire of the guns of the Royal Artillery from the air. Having had poor success at training RAF pilots to direct artillery fire, it was decided to train Army officers who were proficient at the task to pilot aeroplanes. This preceded the recreation of a new air wing within the British Army, the Army Air Corps (which initially included parachute and glider landed units, as well as the Glider Pilot Regiment, but would eventually take over the AOP and other air support roles from the RAF).

Then Second Lieutenants Gorham and Hugh Gregg (who had been commissioned into the BMA from the ranks of the BVE on 28 May 1941) relinquished their BMA commissions on 27 June 1942, on departing Bermuda for England (via Canada), where they received Regular Army emergency commissions into the Royal Artillery on 8 July 1942. Trained by the RAF, they served in squadrons controlled by the RAF. Gorham served in North Africa and Italy. In Italy, while in command of B Flight of 655 Squadron, Royal Air Force, he played the decisive role in the Battle of Monte Cassino when he spotted a German division moving in half-tracked German Armoured Personnel Carriers to counter attack the British 5th Division and the Polish Corps, which were themselves attacking the German-occupied monastery. Contacting the senior Royal Artillery fire control officer on the ground. All two-thousand field guns within range were switched from their local targets and placed under his control. Gorham directed their fire down onto the German Division. The guns fired for hours, with Gorham taking turns with other AOP pilots. The German division was completely destroyed, and the Allied ground forces broke through four days later. For this action, Gorham received the Distinguished Flying Cross, a relative rarity for an Army officer.

=== Post-war service ===
Gorham relinquished his commission as a war substantive lieutenant on 13 June 1946, when he was appointed an honorary captain. Returning to Bermuda, he found the BMA and the BVRC had been reduced to skeleton commands and the BVE and BMI disbanded in 1946, along with the Home Guard. The BMA and BVRC would both maintain skeleton command structures till their strengths were built back up again in 1951 (they would amalgamate in 1965 into the Bermuda Regiment). Gorham entered the BVRC, renamed the Bermuda Rifles, in which he served for a number of years as second-in-command. He was intended to replace Lieutenant-Colonel J.C. Astwood as commanding officer in 1954, but was unable to do so due to illness. Major HRG Evans instead took command. Gorham was part of the detachment sent to London for the coronation of Queen Elizabeth II in 1953, departing from Bermuda aboard HMS Superb on 30 April. He retired from the army with the substantive rank of captain, however he was awarded the honorary rank of colonel in the Royal Artillery.

=== Civil life ===
In his civil life, Richard Gorham became a prominent businessman and Member of the Parliament of Bermuda (originally titled Member of the Colonial Parliament, or MCP, but today simply Member of Parliament, or MP). He donated much of his wealth to a host of causes, including the Bermuda Maritime Museum, and the Bermuda Sloop Foundation. He was appointed an Ordinary Commander of the Civil Division of the Most Excellent Order (CBE) in the Queen's New Year Honours on 31 December 1977, and a Knight Bachelor in the Queen's New Year Honours on 31 December 1994, for public services.

== Bibliography ==
- Jennifer M. Ingham (now Jennifer M. Hind), Defence, Not Defiance: A History of the Bermuda Volunteer Rifle Corps, Pembroke, Bermuda: The Island Press Ltd. ISBN 0-9696517-1-6
- Lt. Commander Ian Strannack, The Andrew and the Onions: The Story of the Royal Navy in Bermuda, 1795–1975, The Bermuda Maritime Museum Press, The Bermuda Maritime Museum, P.O. Box MA 133, Mangrove Bay, Bermuda MA BX. ISBN 0-921560-03-6
- Dr. Edward C. Harris, Bermuda Forts 1612–1957, The Bermuda Maritime Museum Press, The Bermuda Maritime Museum. ISBN 0-921560-11-7
- Lt.-Col. Roger Willock, USMC, Bulwark of Empire: Bermuda's Fortified Naval Base 1860–1920, The Bermuda Maritime Museum Press, The Bermuda Maritime Museum. ISBN 0-921560-00-1
- Sqn.-Ldr Colin A. Pomeroy, Flying Boats of Bermuda, Printlink, PO Box 937, Hamilton, Bermuda HM DX. ISBN 0-9698332-4-5
- Major Cecil Montgomery-Moore, DFC, and Peter Kilduff, That's My Bloody Plane, Chester, Connecticut: The Pequot Press, 1975. ISBN 0-87106-057-4.
