= Bermuda Flying School =

Coordinates: 32°16′30″N 64°49′13″W

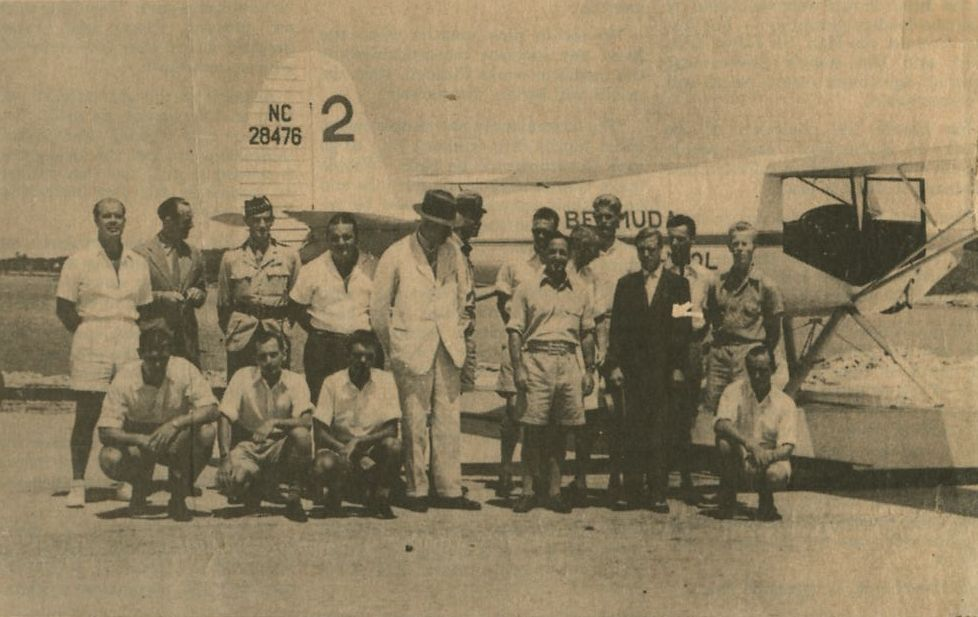
Edward, Duke of Windsor visits the BFS in 1940.

The Bermuda Flying School operated on Darrell's Island from 1940 to 1942. It trained Bermudian volunteers as pilots for the Royal Air Force and the Fleet Air Arm.

During the First World War, roughly twenty Bermudians had entered the Royal Flying Corps and its successor, the Royal Air Force (RAF), as aviators and many others as groundcrew. Other than aircraft on visiting ships, there were no aircraft based in Bermuda 'til after the war, when returning military aviators, Majors Hal Kitchener (son of the late Governor of Bermuda, Lieutenant-General Sir Frederick Walter Kitchener, and nephew of Field Marshal Earl Kitchener) and Hemming, created a small company offering local flights in sea planes operating from Hinson's Island. In 1936, Imperial Airways built an air station on Darrell's Island. This operated as a staging point on scheduled trans-Atlantic flights by flying boats of Imperial Airways and Pan American. At the time, no land planes could operate from Bermuda, there being no airfields.

With the start of the Second World War, the RAF in Bermuda took over Darrell's Island for use by RAF Transport Command and RAF Ferry Command. Although the Royal Navy had a dockyard in Bermuda (which included an air station, RNAS Boaz Island (HMS Malabar) for flying boats), and Canadian and American naval and airbases would be established during the war, the only local units were the part-time army units, the Bermuda Militia Artillery (BMA), Bermuda Volunteer Rifle Corps (BVRC), Bermuda Volunteer Engineers (BVE), the Bermuda Militia Infantry (BMI), and Home Guard. These, along with a regular army detachment of infantry at Prospect Camp, formed the Bermuda Garrison, tasked with defending the various facilities of importance to the war effort. Although a contingent from the BVRC, with attachments from the other units, was sent to join the Lincolnshire Regiment in England in 1940, no further drafts were allowed to be sent for fear of weakening the defences. By 1943, this was no longer a concern and the moratorium was lifted.

It was decided to create a flying school on Darrell's Island to train local pilots for the Air Ministry in Britain, which would assign them to the RAF or the Fleet Air Arm. The school was in operation by the summer of 1940. It operated a pair of Luscombe sea planes, paid for by an American resident of Bermuda, Mr Bertram Work, and a Canadian, Mr Duncan MacMartin. The school was under the command of Major Cecil Montgomery-Moore, DFC, who had served as a fighter pilot during the First World War. Between the wars, he had returned to Bermuda and became the Commanding Officer of the BVE, a position he would maintain throughout the Second World War. The chief flying instructor was an American, Captain Ed Stafford. The first class, of eighteen students, was in training by May 1940. On 4 June, Fenton Trimmingham became the first student to solo. Ten Bermudian companies agreed in June 1940, to defray the expenses of ten of the students. Those companies were the Bank of Bermuda, the Bank of N.T. Butterfield, Trimmingham Bros., H.A. & E. Smith, Gosling Bros., Pearman Watlington & Company, the Bermuda Electric Light Company (BELCO), Bermuda Fire & Marine Insurance Company, the Bermuda Telephone Company (TELCO), and Edmund Gibbons.

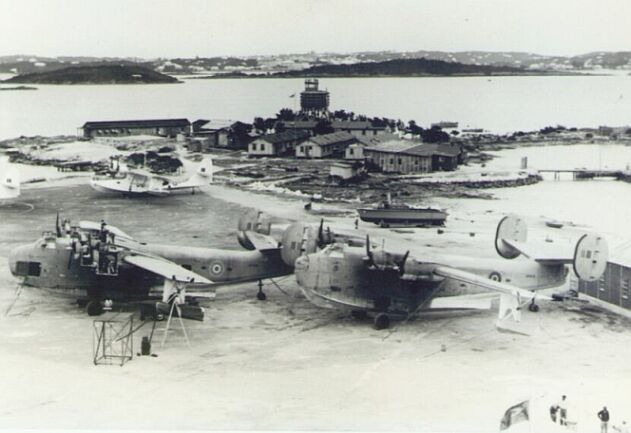
RAF Darrell's Island, the location of the Bermuda Flying School.

The BFS only accepted applicants who were already serving in one of the part-time units, which had been mobilised for the duration of the war. Successful students were released from their units and allowed to proceed overseas. With the moratorium against sending drafts overseas, this meant local soldiers came to see the BFS as the easiest way of reaching sharper ends of the war. Although the local units were allowed to send drafts overseas in 1943, the preceding state of affairs meant that a disproportionately high number of aviators appears on the list of Bermuda's war dead (ten out of thirty-five). In fact, the first Bermudian killed in the war was Flying Officer Grant Ede, DFC, a fighter pilot killed in the Battle of Norway in 1940 (although Ede had joined the RAF in England before the war).

By 1942, the Air Ministry had a glut of trained pilots. This had resulted from the fear created by the Blitz, and the Battle of Britain, when the RAF had assumed pre-eminence in Britain's defence against a feared Axis invasion. Desperate for pilots, too many had been allowed to train, or had been placed on backlists to await slots for induction and training. This would continue to be a problem as late as 1944, when the British Army was forced to disband a division after Operation Overlord due to a shortage of manpower. At the same time, the Air Ministry had the equivalent of a division of civilians waiting aircrew training slots, and already had more aircrew than it had aircraft available for them to man. This would lead to pilots being transferred to the Army's Glider Pilot Regiment, and to the lists of civilians reserved for aircrew training being cleared of men who were then able to be conscripted by the Army.

In Bermuda, the excess of pilots meant that the BFS was advised in 1942 that no further pilots were required. By then, eighty pilots had been sent to the RAF and Fleet Air Arm. THE BFS was included in the Empire Air Training Scheme. Its graduates included eight Americans, who had volunteered for the RAF in the US, and had then been sent to the BFS for training.

Although the school was closed, Bertram Work and Major Montgomery-Moore oversaw the conversion of its administration into a recruiting arm, the Bermuda Flying Committee, for the Royal Canadian Air Force (RCAF), sending sixty aircrew candidates to that service before the War's end. Sixteen Bermudian women were also sent to the RCAF to perform roles including Air Traffic Controller.

Flying instructor Captain Stafford moved to RAF Transport Command, and was later shot down, becoming a prisoner-of-war in Germany. He was piloting a Catalina on a flight from Darrell's Island to Largs in Scotland, on 7 April 1943. Nearing Britain, the crew was diverted by radio to RAF Mountbatten, near Plymouth, but a navigational error sent them over occupied France. They were shot down near Landéda, Brittany, by anti-aircraft artillery and two Luftwaffe fighters. The first officer was killed outright, and the navigator wounded. Stafford succeeded in landing the aeroplane two miles offshore, still under fire. Three, including Stafford, were pulled from the water by French fisherman. The bodies of two other crewmen washed up two days later, and the third three weeks later. As a POW, Captain Stafford headed a team of Allied orderlies in a wing of the Hohemark hospital, in Hesse, which was dedicated to the care of Prisoners of War from the Dulag Luft POW Camp in Oberusel (which was to become Camp King of the United States Army after the war).

The two Luscombe aircraft remained at Darrell's Island, being used by the RAF as station hacks. After the war they were used by the short-lived Bermuda Flying Club, created by returning pilots.

== See also ==
Military of Bermuda

== Bibliography ==
- Defence, Not Defiance: A History Of The Bermuda Volunteer Rifle Corps, Jennifer M. Ingham (now Jennifer M. Hind), The Island Press Ltd., Pembroke, Bermuda, ISBN 0-9696517-1-6
- The Andrew And The Onions: The Story Of The Royal Navy In Bermuda, 1795–1975, Lt. Commander Ian Strannack, The Bermuda Maritime Museum Press, The Bermuda Maritime Museum, P.O. Box MA 133, Mangrove Bay, Bermuda MA BX. ISBN 0-921560-03-6
- Bermuda Forts 1612–1957, Dr. Edward C. Harris, The Bermuda Maritime Museum Press, The Bermuda Maritime Museum, ISBN 0-921560-11-7
- Bulwark Of Empire: Bermuda's Fortified Naval Base 1860–1920, Lt.-Col. Roger Willock, USMC, The Bermuda Maritime Museum Press, The Bermuda Maritime Museum, ISBN 0-921560-00-1
- Flying Boats Of Bermuda, Sqn.-Ldr. Colin A. Pomeroy, Printlink, PO Box 937, Hamilton, Bermuda HM DX, ISBN 0-9698332-4-5
- Bermuda From Sail To Steam: The History Of The Island From 1784 to 1901, Dr. Henry Wilkinson, Oxford University Press, ISBN 0-19-215932-1
- That's My Bloody Plane, by Major Cecil Montgomery-Moore, DFC, and Peter Kilduff. 1975. The Pequot Press, Chester, Connecticut. ISBN 0-87106-057-4.
