= Bermuda Volunteer Engineers =

The Bermuda Volunteer Engineers
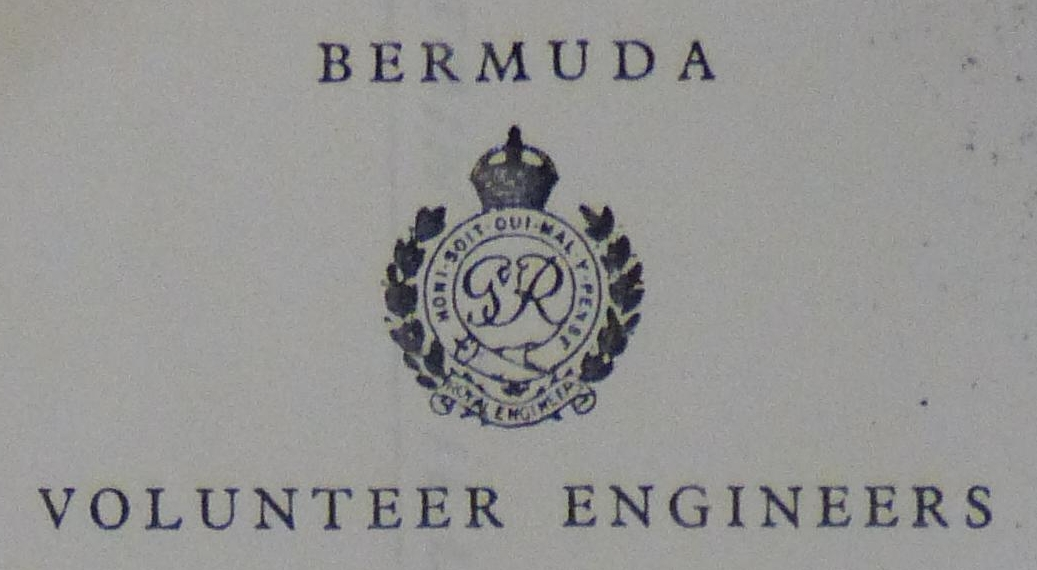
- Cap Badge of the Corps of Royal Engineers on Bermuda Volunteer Engineers stationery letterhead
- Active: 1931-1946
- Country: Bermuda (United Kingdom overseas territory)
- Branch: British Army
- Type: Military engineering

The Bermuda Volunteer Engineers was a part-time unit created between the two world wars to replace the Regular Royal Engineers detachment, which was withdrawn from the Bermuda Garrison in 1928.

== History ==
=== The Military Garrison in Bermuda ===
From 1895 to 1931, the only Bermudian units within the garrison were part-time infantry and artillery soldiers, the Bermuda Volunteer Rifle Corps and the Bermuda Militia Artillery, respectively. Each unit had been created under a separate Act of the colonial parliament, at the prompting of the Secretary of State for War, in London. A third act had also been passed authorising the creation of a militia engineering unit of sappers and miners. This would have followed in the pattern of The Submarine Mining Militia formed in Britain in 1878 and tasked with defending major ports. They received a minimum of fifty-five days training per year, and were recruited from experienced boatmen. In Bermuda, the unit was intended to operate boat from the Royal Army Service Corps docks in Hamilton and St. George's, tending to the underwater mine defences, but the unit was never raised. Instead, the Royal Engineers 27th Company (Submarine Mining) which had been permanently reassigned from Halifax, Nova Scotia to Bermuda in 1888 (part of the company had been split off to create the new 40th Company, which remained in Halifax), continued to maintain the mine defences unaided. This unit was not raised. Unit codes were assigned to all three legislated units for marking the stock disks of the Martini-Henry rifle: M./BER. A. for the Bermuda Militia Artillery; V./BER. for the Bermuda Volunteers Rifle Corps; M./BER. S.M. for the Bermuda Submarine Miners.

Submarine mine defence was only one of many activities the Royal Engineers were involved in within Bermuda, which particularly included building forts and infrastructure. In 1900 the Royal Engineers Submarine Mining Companies also assumed responsibility for operating electric searchlights defending harbours.

During the First World War, in addition to fulfilling their roles as guardians of Bermuda and its important Imperial defence assets (such as the Royal Naval Dockyard), each of these units sent two contingents to the Western Front. Numerous other Bermudians served in other regiments and corps of the British Army, as well as in the Royal Navy and the new Royal Air Force.

Large numbers of regular infantry and artillery soldiers, plus various supporting units, had been stationed in Bermuda since the early 19th Century, but the UK Government had been trying to reduce the expense of maintaining garrisons around the world, following the Crimean War, by encouraging the raising of volunteer units in the various colonies and protectorates. This had led to the creation of the two Bermudian units, and the size of the regular forces in Bermuda was steadily reduced from about 1870 onward.

From 1919 the regular infantry battalion on garrison was reduced to a wing. Excepting the years 1925 to 1929, when a full battalion was present, this remained the case 'til 1940. In May, 1928, the Royal Artillery companies and Royal Engineers Fortress Company were withdrawn entirely. The existing volunteer units were able to take on the roles vacated by the regular infantry and Royal Artillery, but the creation of a new volunteer unit was necessary to fulfil that of the Royal Engineers.

=== Creation of the Bermuda Volunteer Engineers ===
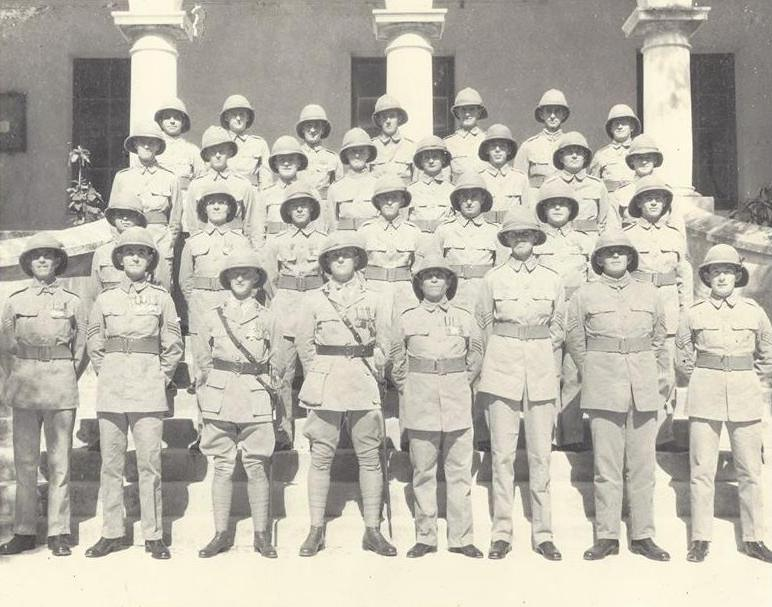
Bermuda Volunteer Engineers 1934

The Bermuda Volunteer Engineers was created in June, 1931. Its original strength was one captain, one subaltern, three sergeants, four corporals, and twenty-four sappers. An adjutant, a sergeant-major, and two sergeants were attached from the regular Royal Engineers. Its original role was to operate the search lights at coastal artillery batteries. The only battery left in active use by that time was the Examination Battery at St. David's Head, the guns of which were manned by the BMA.

The first commanding officer of the BVE was Captain H.D. (later Sir Harry) Butterfield, and the second-in-command was Lieutenant Cecil Montgomery-Moore, DFC. Both were veterans of the First World War (Montgomery-Moore had served in the BVRC before taking a commission as a fighter pilot in the Royal Flying Corps). In 1932, Butterfield retired, and Montgomery-Moore succeeded him. The new 2-i-c was Lieutenant Nicholas Bayard Dill (later Sir Bayard), a son of Colonel Thomas Melville Dill (a former commander of the BMA).

In 1937, the BVE subsequently also took on responsibility for providing signals crew and equipment to all elements of the garrison.

=== Second World War ===
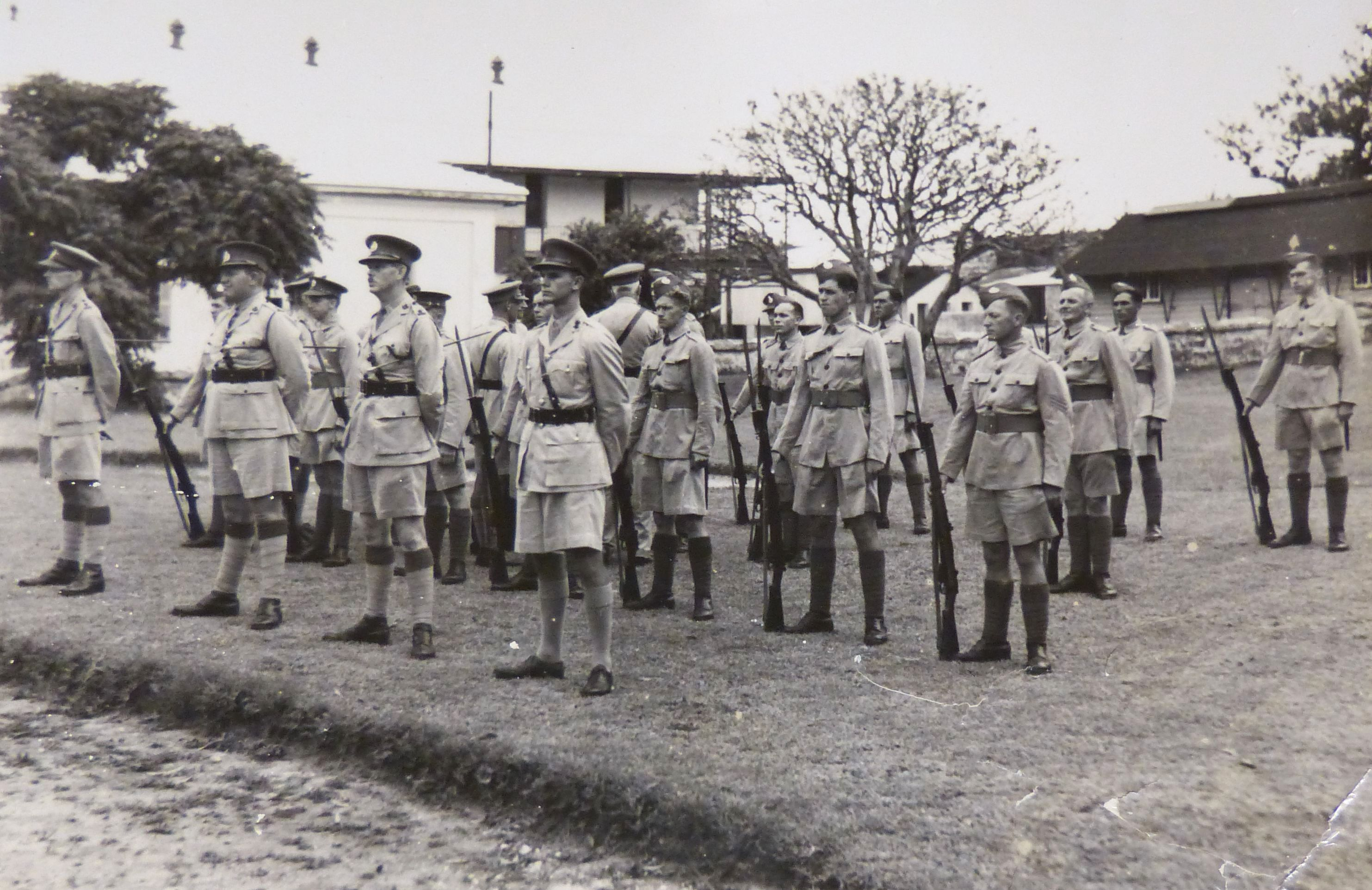
Governor and General Officer Commanding, Lieutenant-General Sir Denis Bernard, inspects the BVRC First Contingent to the Lincolnshire Regiment at Prospect Camp on 22 June 1940. Sappers CW Cooper, FC Mansbridge, EA Fountain, and RJ Isted of the BVE were attached to the contingent for transit.

The BVE, and the other part-time units, were mobilised at the start of the Second World War, fulfilling its role to the Garrison throughout the war. Some members also were detached for service overseas with other units, including the Royal Artillery and the Royal Air Force. These included four Sappers who were attached to a larger BVRC contingent despatched to the Lincolnshire Regiment in June, 1940.

Another was Lieutenant-Colonel Sir Richard Gorham, DFC, who had enlisted into the ranks of the Bermuda Volunteer Engineers in 1938, and was embodied for full-time service, when the various territorial units of the Bermuda Garrison (the Bermuda Militia Artillery (BMA), Bermuda Volunteer Rifle Corps (BVRC), and the Bermuda Militia Infantry) were mobilised when the Second World War was declared. As a corporal, he was attached to the signalling division at the Royal Naval Dockyard, before he was commissioned on the 28 May 1941, as a Second-Lieutenant into the Bermuda Militia Artillery on 20 December 1940, replacing Second-Lieutenant Francis J. Gosling, who had trained as a pilot at the Bermuda Flying School and was to depart for the United Kingdom in January for transfer to the Royal Air Force. Gorham would serve only briefly with the Bermuda Militia Artillery before he followed Gosling across the Atlantic to serve as an air observation post pilot, directing the fire of artillery guns, having received a Regular Army (Royal Artillery) emergency commissions on 8 July 1942. Gorham also served after the war in the Bermuda Rifles (as the Bermuda Volunteer Rifle Corps was retitled in 1949).

In Bermuda, Montgomery-Moore was promoted to major in 1940, and Bayard Dill to captain. In addition to his role with the BVE, Montgomery-Moore also headed the Bermuda Flying School, which trained 80 local volunteers as pilots for the RAF and the Fleet Air Arm. Volunteers were only accepted from those already serving in the local forces, some of whom came from the BVE.

=== Disbandment ===
The BVE, as with all of the local volunteer units, was demobilised in 1946 following the end of the war. The BMA, BVRC and BVE maintained skeleton command structures, with discharged personnel liable for recall from the reserve. The BMA and BVRC (renamed Bermuda Rifles) were retained under the 1959 Defence Act, and began recruiting again in 1951, but the Bermuda Volunteer Engineers was officially disbanded.

== Bibliography ==
- Defence, Not Defiance: A History Of The Bermuda Volunteer Rifle Corps, Jennifer M. Ingham (now Jennifer M. Hind), The Island Press Ltd., Pembroke, Bermuda, ISBN 0-9696517-1-6
- The Andrew And The Onions: The Story Of The Royal Navy In Bermuda, 1795 – 1975, Lt. Commander Ian Strannack, The Bermuda Maritime Museum Press, The Bermuda Maritime Museum, P.O. Box MA 133, Mangrove Bay, Bermuda MA BX. ISBN 0-921560-03-6
- Bermuda Forts 1612–1957, Dr. Edward C. Harris, The Bermuda Maritime Museum Press, The Bermuda Maritime Museum, ISBN 0-921560-11-7
- Bulwark Of Empire: Bermuda's Fortified Naval Base 1860-1920, Lt.-Col. Roger Willock, USMC, The Bermuda Maritime Museum Press, The Bermuda Maritime Museum, ISBN 0-921560-00-1
- Flying Boats Of Bermuda, Sqn.-Ldr. Colin A. Pomeroy, Printlink, PO Box 937, Hamilton, Bermuda HM DX, ISBN 0-9698332-4-5
- Bermuda From Sail To Steam: The History Of The Island From 1784 to 1901, Dr. Henry Wilkinson, Oxford University Press, ISBN 0-19-215932-1
- That's My Bloody Plane, by Major Cecil Montgomery-Moore, DFC, and Peter Kilduff. 1975. The Pequot Press, Chester, Connecticut. ISBN 0-87106-057-4.
