= Bermuda Militia (1813–1815) =

With the start of the American War of 1812, an Act of 1813 re-organized the Military of Bermuda's nine-company regiment of foot into two battalions. The total strength of the local militia was, by then, nominally 450 men, but, as always, this was, at any moment, effectively reduced by half due to the seafaring occupations of the better part of the colony's men. Evidently, the militia no longer included any of the colony's black population, whether free or enslaved, as Lt. Colonel Francis Gore, on assuming the governorship, felt it advisable to boost the militia's strength by raising a colored corps, though this was not, in fact, done.

Despite the state of the Militia at the War's start, on the occasion of an emergency being declared (when strange vessels were spotted lurking offshore), the Colonists responded admirably in full strength, standing watch through the night.

The War Office had begun the War considering the Bermudians to be of dubious loyalty. This was largely due to the theft of a large quantity of gunpowder from a St. George's magazine during the American War of Independence, in 1775. That powder had been sent to the rebel army of the American colonies, under the Virginian General George Washington, and at his personal request. The close blood-lines and common history of Bermuda and Virginia, particularly, were also worrying.

In fact, the War Office was very pleased with the performance and patriotism of the Islanders during the 1812 war, and the Governor was prompted to try to get the Colonial Assembly to en-act a permanent Militia. Throughout the Militia's history, its strength and efficiency had waxed and waned, more with the response to declarations of wars, and to the scarcity of manpower due to the maritime industry, than with any dictum of the Colonial Assembly. The Generals wanted something a little more reliable.

The Colonial Assembly, lacking any strong self-interest, and perhaps wary of obliging itself to the maintenance of a force that, with the growth of the Regular Garrison, must become ever less under its control, would only agree to provide funds on a temporary basis. After the War ended in 1815, the interest of the general populace also waned, and the Militia's strength dwindled 'til the point it became moribund. The Militia Act of 1813 was allowed to lapse, and no further Militia Act was to be passed, despite the continuing pleas and threats coming from London.

Although variably-successful attempts were made to raise militias directly under the governor, without an act, or the funds, of the Colonial Assembly, a real militia would not arise again 'til the raising of volunteer forces in the last decade of the 19th century.

== See also ==
- Bermuda Militias 1612-1815
- Royal Naval Dockyard, Bermuda
- War of 1812

== Bibliography ==
- Defence, Not Defiance: A History Of The Bermuda Volunteer Rifle Corps, Jennifer M. Ingham (now Jennifer M. Hind), The Island Press Ltd., Pembroke, Bermuda, ISBN 0-9696517-1-6
- Bermuda Forts 1612–1957, Dr. Edward C. Harris, The Bermuda Maritime Museum Press, The Bermuda Maritime Museum, P.O. Box MA 133, Mangrove Bay, Bermuda MA BX.
- Bermuda From Sail To Steam: A History of The Island From 1784 To 1901, H. C. Wilkinson, Oxford University Press, ISBN 0-19-215932-1

== Sources ==
The text of this page was originally copied directly from the author's own free pages at:

- Bermuda Military History
