= Cecil Montgomery-Moore =

American-born Bermudian First World War fighter pilot

Major Cecil Montgomery-Moore DFC (1 July 1899 – 8 December 1970) was an American-born Bermudian First World War fighter pilot, and commander of the Bermuda Volunteer Engineers and the Bermuda Flying School during the Second World War.

== Early life ==
Montgomery-Moore was born in Chicopee, Massachusetts in 1899, to Alexander Acheson Montgomery-Moore, who was born in Waterford, Ireland and moved to the United States in 1890, and Lillian Webber Montgomery-Moore, born in New Hampshire. The family moved to the Imperial fortress colony of Bermuda in 1909.

== First World War ==
During the First World War, Cecil Montgomery-Moore was an enlisted man in the Bermuda Volunteer Rifle Corps, attesting on 10 September 1915 (from 1 July 1910 to 10 September 1915, he had served in the Bermuda Cadet Corps). He was given leave to travel to Canada to join the Royal Flying Corps (RFC), air wing of the British Army, one of twenty or so Bermudians who did so during that war, and was discharged from the BVRC effective 7 August 1917, the date he began service in the RFC. He was one of two Bermudian airmen to earn the Distinguished Flying Cross during the war (the other being Rowe Spurling). On 1 April 1918, Lieutenant Montgomery-Moore, along with the rest of the RFC and the Royal Naval Air Service (RNAS), became part of the new Royal Air Force, from which he was discharged on 5 May 1919.

== Between the Wars ==
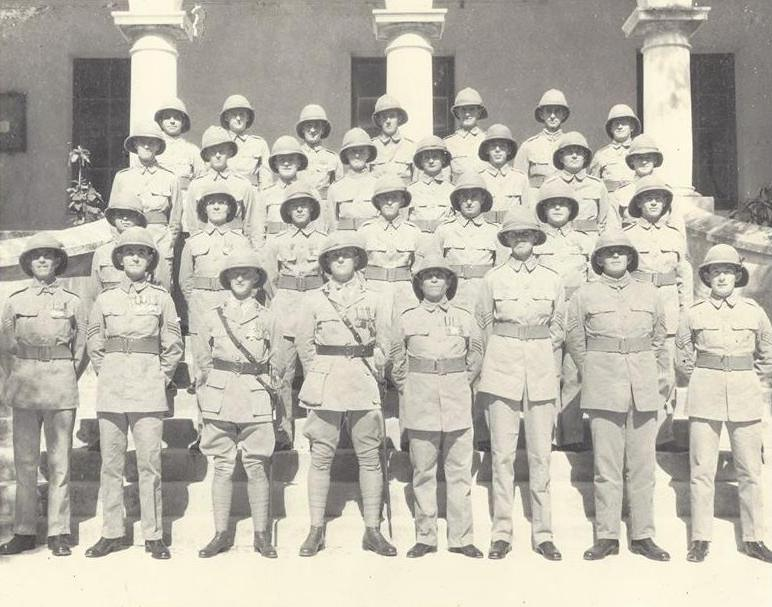
Bermuda Volunteer Engineers, 1934. Lieutenant Cecil Montgomery-Moore, DFC, in front row, third from left

Following the First World War, Montgomery-Moore returned to Bermuda. In 1931, the Bermuda Volunteer Engineers (BVE) was created as a replacement for the departed regular Royal Engineers Fortress Company of the Bermuda Garrison (that guarded the Royal Naval Dockyard in Bermuda). The original role of the BVE was to operate the search lights at coastal artillery batteries, notably the Examination Battery at St. David's Head, the guns of which were manned by the Bermuda Militia Artillery (BMA). The BVE subsequently also took on responsibility for providing signals crew and equipment to all elements of the garrison.

The first commanding officer of the BVE was Captain H.D. (later Sir Harry) Butterfield, and Lieutenant Montgomery-Moore (who began service with the BVE on 12 February 1931) was second-in-command. In 1932, Butterfield retired, and Montgomery-Moore succeeded him. The new 2-i-c was Lieutenant Bayard Dill (later Sir Bayard), whose father, Colonel Thomas Melville Dill, was a former commander of the BMA.

== Second World War ==
The BVE, like the other part-time units, was mobilised at the start of the Second World War, fulfilling its role to the Garrison throughout the war. Some members also were detached for service overseas with other units. These included four Sappers who were attached to a larger BVRC contingent despatched to the Lincolnshire Regiment in June 1940, and Captain Richard Gorham, who served in Italy, earning a Distinguished Flying Cross for his decisive role in the Battle of Monte Cassino.

In Bermuda, Montgomery-Moore was promoted to major in 1940, and Bayard Dill to captain. In addition to his role with the BVE, Montgomery-Moore also headed the Bermuda Flying School, which trained 80 local volunteers as pilots for the RAF and the Fleet Air Arm. Volunteers were only accepted from those already serving in the local forces, some of whom came from the BVE.

After 1942, with the RAF having a glut of trained pilots, the school converted into the Bermuda Flying Committee, a recruiting arm for the Royal Canadian Air Force, to which it sent sixty aircrew trainees, as well as twenty-two women to train for ground roles. The BFC was administered by Montgomery-Moore, as well as Bertram Work and others previously associated with the BFS. Montgomery-Moore had been dispatched to Canada to make arrangements for it to send its aircrew candidates, and he received a commendation from the RCAF at the end of the war for his efforts.

== Post-War ==
The BVE was demobilised in 1946, as were the other three territorials and the Home Guard. The BVRC and the BMA maintained skeleton command structures until they began recruiting again in 1951. The BVE, however, with its two main roles becoming obsolete, was disbanded completely.

Montgomery-Moore was discharged on 25 January 1946, and returned to civilian life, eventually settling in Connecticut, where he died in 1970. Peter Kilduff posthumously published Montgomery-Moore's memoirs as That's My Bloody Plane. His wife, Hélène, gave gifts to Columbia University in New York, and funded the Mrs. Cecil Montgomery-Moore Scholarship for journalism, in memory of Alice Weel Bigart. (Note: Alice Weel Bigart was the wife of reporter Homer Bigart. She became the first woman to write full-time for a US network news programme when she joined CBS' Douglas Edwards and the News in 1948. She later became Producer of 60 Minutes). She died of cancer in 1969.)

== Bibliography ==
- Defence, Not Defiance: A History of the Bermuda Volunteer Rifle Corps, Jennifer M. Ingham (aka Jennifer Hind). Island Press Ltd., Pembroke, Bermuda; ISBN 0-9696517-1-6
- The Andrew and the Onions: The Story of the Royal Navy in Bermuda, 1795–1975, Lt. Commander Ian Strannack, The Bermuda Maritime Museum Press, The Bermuda Maritime Museum, P.O. Box MA 133, Mangrove Bay, Bermuda MA BX; ISBN 0-921560-03-6
- Bermuda Forts 1612–1957, Dr. Edward C. Harris, The Bermuda Maritime Museum Press, The Bermuda Maritime Museum; ISBN 0-921560-11-7
- Bulwark of Empire: Bermuda's Fortified Naval Base 1860–1920, Lt.-Col. Roger Willock, USMC, The Bermuda Maritime Museum Press, The Bermuda Maritime Museum; ISBN 0-921560-00-1
- Flying Boats of Bermuda, Sqn.-Ldr. Colin A. Pomeroy, Printlink, PO Box 937, Hamilton, Bermuda HM DX; ISBN 0-9698332-4-5
- That's My Bloody Plane, by Major Cecil Montgomery-Moore, DFC, and Peter Kilduff. 1975. The Pequot Press, Chester, Connecticut; ISBN 0-87106-057-4.
