= Bermuda Militia (1687–1813) =

Bermuda Militia, under Militia Acts 1687–1813. Although the Bermuda Parliament had been formed in 1620, prior to 1687, the Bermudian Militia was raised and organised without reference to a Militia Act. The Crown took over the administration of the Colony from The Somers Isles Company in 1684.

== Militia Act, 1687 ==
In 1687 the first Crown-appointed governor, Royal Naval officer Sir Robert Robinson arrived in Bermuda. Finding the state of defences less than satisfactory, he raised a militia of 780 men, with provisions made to arm those men with no weapons of their own. He also pushed an Act of Parliament through the reluctant Colonial Assembly, raising two troops of horse. A standing watch was raised to patrol through the parishes, with three 'well armed' footmen and a horseman in each parish (then known as 'tribes') on each night.

== Militia Act of 1690/91 ==
In 1690/91, another Militia Act was passed, requiring every man, whether free or enslaved, between the ages of 15 and 60 to "appear at every exercise and muster and provide himself with sword and musket. Slave owners were responsible to provide weapons to their slaves." Those found negligent could be fined, and those not paying fines could be flogged. King's Castle now received a guard of four men, under a lieutenant. Two men were posted at Paget's Fort, and a lookout at the highest point in Saint George's.

== Militia Act, 1702 ==
In 1702, Britain entered the War of the Spanish Succession, against France. This war also included a French campaign, with Allied Native Nations (Indians) against British possessions in North America. The previous year, with this war looming, a company of regular infantry was sent to Bermuda and made an "independent company" (the first regular army deployment to the colony).

With the onset of the war, the militia was strengthened. Six hundred men were armed and trained with lances. A troop of horse grenadiers was raised (amongst those wealthy enough to afford a horse; the primary method of transport about the colony would remain, until the 20th century, by boat).

Despite the deployment of a regular company, the island's defences were then completely neglected by the London government as the war with France dragged on until 1713. War with Spain was opened in 1715, and no military supplies were despatched to Bermuda until 1728.

== Militia Act, 1728 ==
The next addition to the militia was made in 1728 when The King's Independent Company of 50 men was raised. In 1741, local militia, along with two Bermudian sloops, responded to a Spanish raid on Southampton Parish, but the Spaniards had retreated before the militia arrived.

== Militia Act, 1747 ==
In 1747, with the War of the Austrian Succession looming, the troop of horse grenadiers was split into eastern and western sections.

== Militia Act, 1758 ==
In 1758, after the start of the Seven Years' War, a troop of horse and a regiment of foot of nine companies was formed; each of the nine parishes was to provide a company under the command of a captain, a lieutenant and an ensign. The troop of horse would have, in addition to these officers, a cornet and two 'brigadiers'.

The end of war in 1763 led to the withdrawal of the independent company. It was replaced by a detached company of the 9th Regiment of Foot, from Florida. Although it was attempted to bring this unit up to strength with men taken from the Bahamas Independent Company, it never had more than 20 privates (a company of that day being comparable to a modern platoon, with 45 to 50 men). In 1768, this company was returned to Florida, leaving Bermuda without a regular garrison. Except for a period during the American War of Independence, the colony's military defence was left, thenceforth, to its own militias until 1793.

== Militia Act, 1789 ==
In 1789, a volunteer artillery company was raised to augment the troop of horse and the nine companies of the regiment of foot. This consisted of 20 privates, 2 sergeants and a lieutenant.

== Militia Act, 1794 ==
With the American War of Independence, Bermuda began to assume an importance to the Admiralty that would see it become the base of the North America and West Indies Squadron, and the site of the only full naval dockyard west of Portsmouth. In 1793, with the French Revolution, a detachment of the 47th Foot was posted to Bermuda as part of the garrison. Thenceforth, for nearly two centuries, there would remain a regular army component to the colony's defences. The following year, in 1794, an Act of the Colonial Assembly replaced the single volunteer artillery company with three companies, each of eight privates.

At this time, the commanding officer of the Militia decided what uniform was worn, which each man provided at his own expense. the captain of each company of foot had to provide for a colour, a drum and a fife. Horse troopers had to provide their own mounts.

== Militia Act, 1802 ==
The Militia Act of 1802 disbanded the volunteer artillery (regular artillery being stationed on the island, amateurs were seen as unnecessary). In 1803, a general order was issued by the president (of the appointed Governor's Council - which filled the role that today is served by the Cabinet, drawn from the MPs of the ruling party). This gave the commander-in-chief (normally, the governor) and field officers of the militia the power to raise an alarm, whenever either deemed it necessary for the safety of the colony. It also stated that "as often as any vessels shall be seen coming to, or hovering about, any part of the coast which in the joint opinion of any captain of a company and any captain of a Fort, shall afford just ground to apprehend and suspect that they are the vessels of an enemy, and actuated by any hostile intention, such captain of a company and such captain of a Fort, shall cojointly have power to cause a general alarm to be raised, sending immediate notice of their apprehensions or suspicions to the nearest Field Officer." When such an alarm was raised, all males obliged to bear arms were to muster at their parish rendezvous.

== The militia, after American independence ==
After US independence, Bermuda assumed great importance to the Admiralty, which developed it throughout the nineteenth century as a naval base, dockyard, and admiralty headquarters. The concurrent build-up of the regular military garrison to protect the naval base meant that Bermuda's militia came to be seen as superfluous. By the time the US declared war in 1812, the militia had been allowed to wither away. The Militia Act, 1813 was passed as a wartime expediency.

== Bibliography ==
Defence, Not Defiance: A History Of The Bermuda Volunteer Rifle Corps, Jennifer M. Ingham (now Jennifer M. Hind), ISBN 0-9696517-1-6. Printed by The Island Press Ltd., Pembroke, Bermuda. Itself using as a source the unique, typescript "History of The Bermuda Volunteer Rifle Corps, 1891 - 1933", held at the Bermuda Library, in Hamilton.

The Andrew And The Onions: The Story Of The Royal Navy In Bermuda, 1795 – 1975, Lt. Commander Ian Strannack, The Bermuda Maritime Museum Press, The Bermuda Maritime Museum, P.O. Box MA 133, Mangrove Bay, Bermuda MA BX.

Bermuda Forts 1612–1957, Dr. Edward C. Harris, The Bermuda Maritime Museum Press, The Bermuda Maritime Museum, P.O. Box MA 133, Mangrove Bay, Bermuda MA BX.

== Part of ==
Bermuda Military of Bermuda Bermuda Militias 1612-1815

== See also ==
- Bermuda Militia 1612-1687
