= Arbitrary Lines =

Book by M. Nolan Grey

Arbitrary Lines: How Zoning Broke the American City and How to Fix It is a book by M. Nolan Gray, first published in 2022 by Island Press. The book explains city zoning and its related problems.

The book starts by describing the history of zoning and the motivations of its creators. It continues to the present day, describing how many of the same legal mechanisms create barriers to development in many cities. The author prioritizes their focus on urban development in the United States.
