= Frank Bell (RAF airman) =

Frank William Bell
- Born: George Stanley Bell; 23 August 1897; Margate, Kent
- Died: February 1960 (aged 62–63); Reading, Berkshire
- Military career
- Allegiance: United Kingdom
- Branch: British Army; Royal Air Force
- Rank: Sergeant
- Units: No. 9 Squadron RFC; No. 49 Squadron RAF; No. 11 Squadron RAF
- Awards: Distinguished Flying Medal

Sergeant Frank William Bell DFM (23 August 1897 – February 1960) was an observer and air gunner in the Royal Air Force during World War I. He was a flying ace credited, together with his pilot, with six aerial victories.

== Biography ==
Born George Stanley Bell in Margate, Kent, he had joined the Territorial Force in 1914 and was subsequently called up at the outbreak of World War I. In December 1914 he requested compassionate leave in order to visit his father, who was dying of tuberculosis. Permission was refused, so Bell deserted. However, in January 1915, he re-enlisted in the Royal Welsh Fusiliers under the name of Frank William Bell, falsifying both his name and date of birth.

=== Service in the RFC ===
In mid-1915 Bell transferred to the Royal Flying Corps as an Observer/Machine Gunner in No. 9 Squadron RFC. In his log book he signed his name as G. W. Bell and his military records show an earlier date of birth.

Bell scored his first victory on 25 July 1918 while flying in a DH.9 of No. 49 Squadron RAF, with pilot Lieutenant Arthur Rowe Spurling, shooting down a Fokker D.VII fighter over Mont-Notre-Dame.

On 23 August 1918, which was Bell's 21st birthday, Bell and Spurling were returning from a bombing mission in their DH.9 when they became separated from their squadron in cloud. After some time Spurling descended, believing that he must have crossed the front lines. Seeing an airfield below he prepared to land, only to see a formation of thirty enemy aircraft rising towards him. Only then did Spurling and Bell realize that they were still over German territory. Spurling dived through the middle of the formation, destroying one aircraft and seeing two more spin out of control. Bell also shot down two more aircraft, before they made their escape. Spurling was awarded the Distinguished Flying Cross, largely on the strength of this action, and Bell was awarded the Distinguished Flying Medal.

The citation, published in The London Gazette on 1 November 1918, read:

A keen and reliable Observer, who has taken part in eighteen bomb raids, invariably showing gallantry and devotion to duty, notably on a certain occasion not long since, when his Pilot dived through the centre of an enemy formation of some thirty machines; five of these subsequently closed on his machine, but by skilful manoeuvring the Pilot gave Serjt. Bell the opportunity, which he took quick advantage of, by shooting down two of the enemy aircraft in flames, while the remaining three broke off the combat and disappeared in the mist.

Bell's logbook records that he was hospitalized in Boulogne from 24 August and was returned to England four days later. In September he was assigned to No. 11 Squadron RAF.
