= Ireland Island, Bermuda =

Island in Bermuda

Coordinates: 32°19′31″N 64°50′09″W

Location of Ireland Island in Bermuda

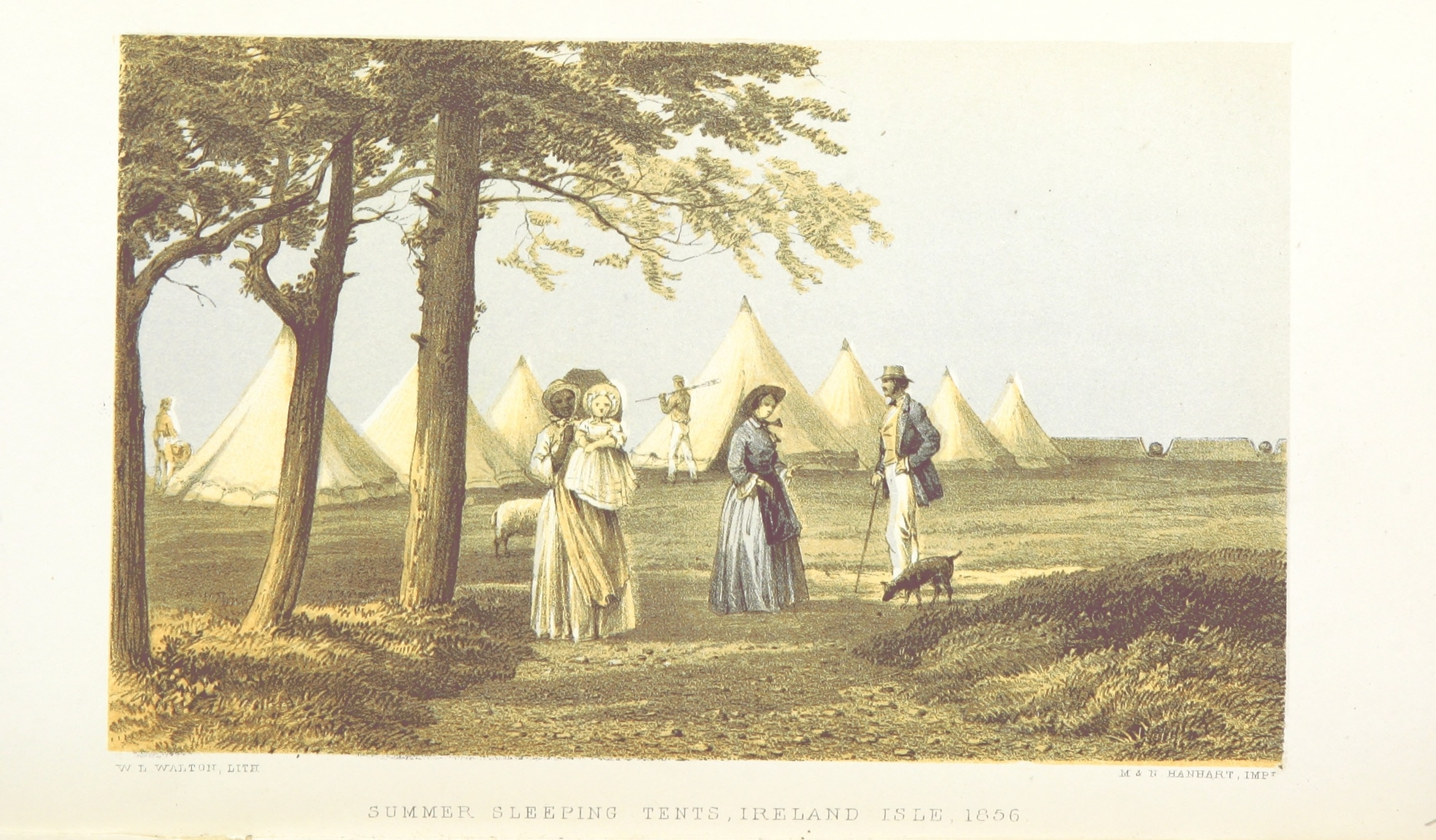
Ireland Isle, 1856, summer sleeping tents

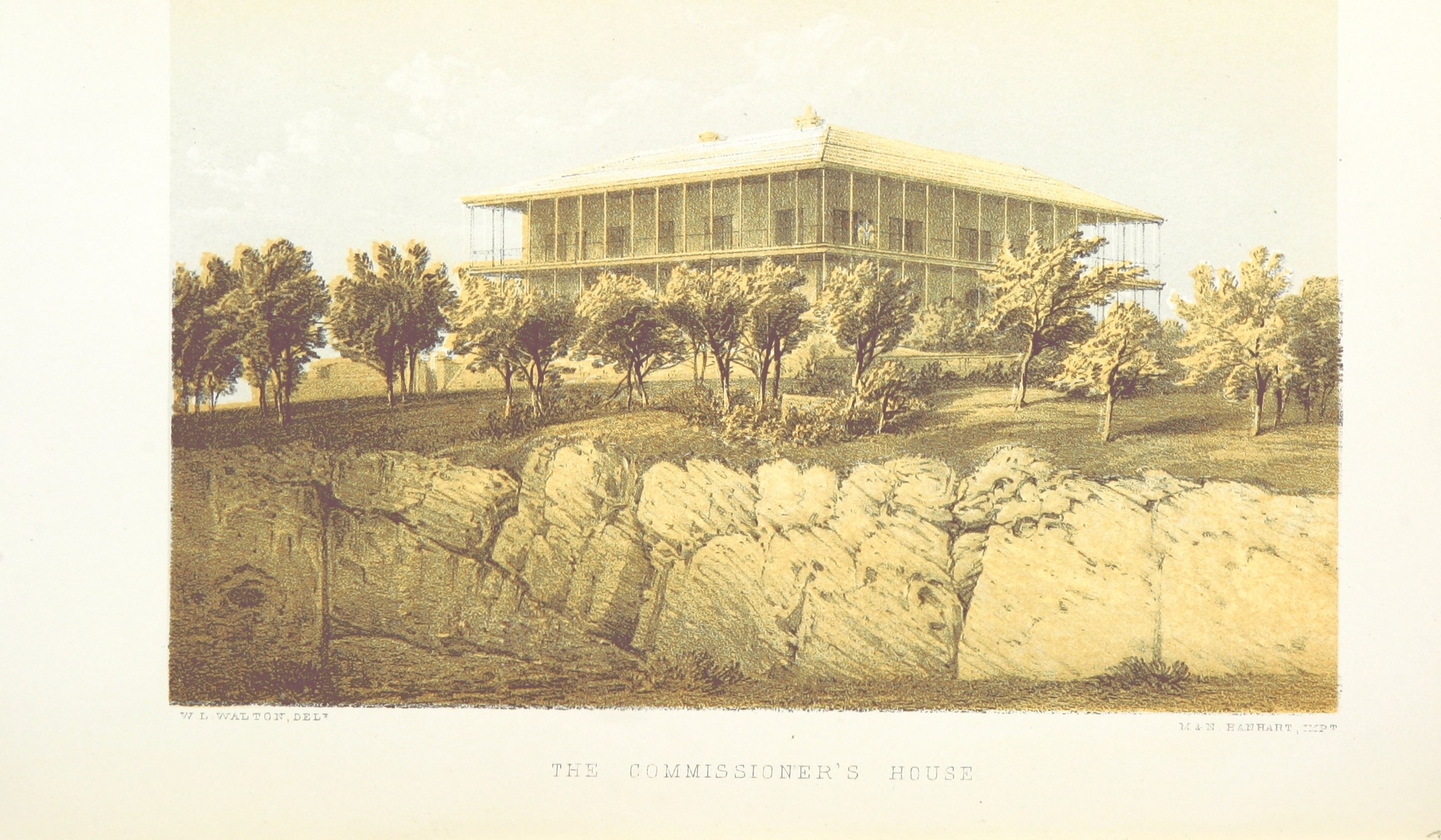
The Commissioner's House, 1857

Ireland Island is the north-westernmost island in the chain which comprises Bermuda. It forms a long finger of land pointing northeastwards from the main island, the last link in a chain which also includes Boaz Island and Somerset Island. It lies within Sandys Parish, and forms the northwestern coast of the Great Sound. It is regarded as one of the six principal islands of Bermuda, and part of the West End of the archipelago.

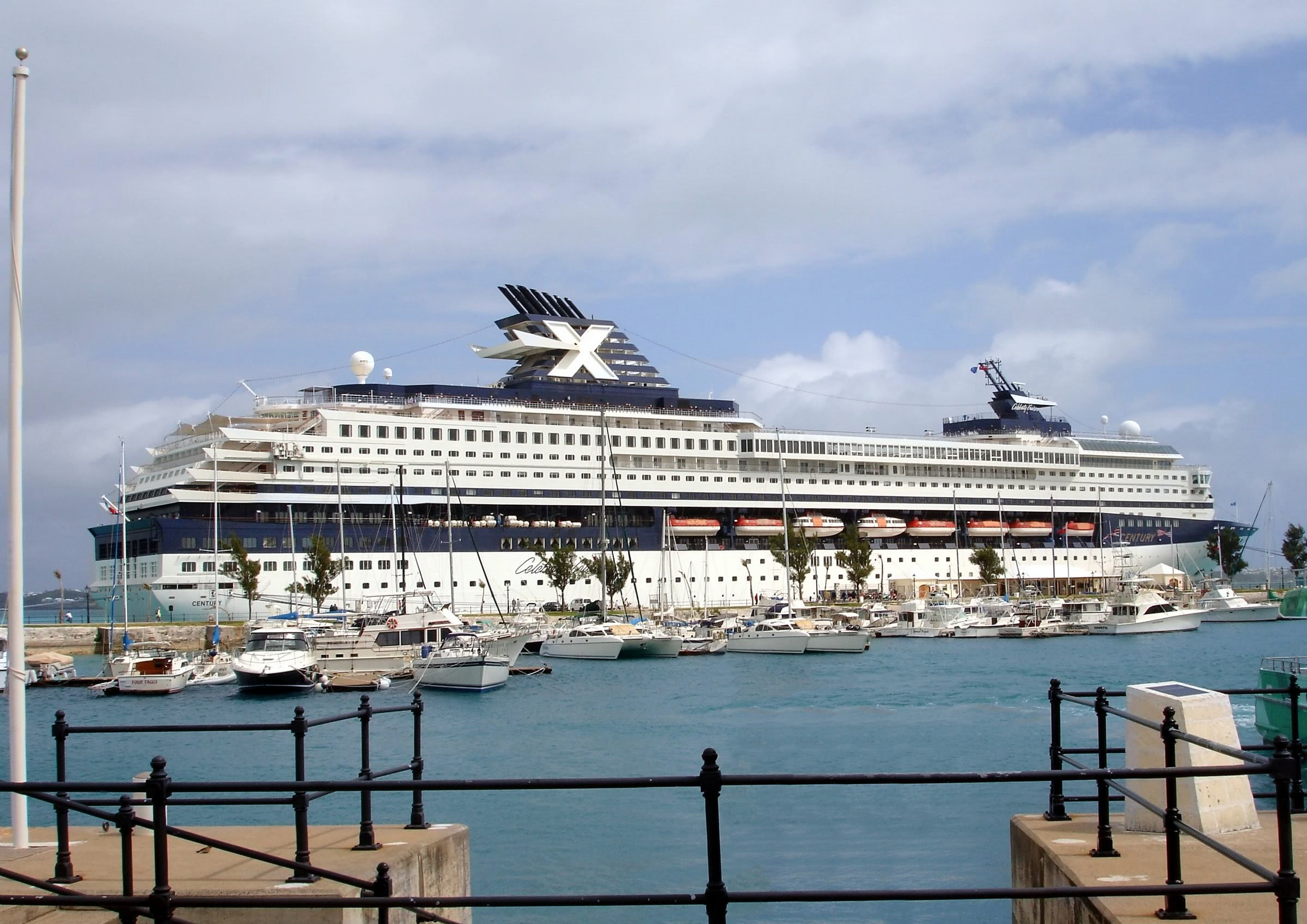
King's Wharf

In 1618, a privateering vessel under the command of a notorious pirate by the name of Powell ran aground on the main island, and Powell was banished to the island (which at that time was uninhabited) by the colonial governor. Following the American War of Independence, which left Bermuda the only British territory between Nova Scotia and the West Indies, the Royal Navy bought the island to use for a lighthouse and dockyard.

A dozen years were spent surveying Bermuda's encompassing reef for a channel sufficient to enable ships of burthen to reach Ireland Island and the Great Sound. Although the Admiralty had already begun acquiring Ireland Island and other properties around the Great Sound, in 1795 it first established a base at the East End, where Admiralty House was first located at Rose Hill, beside St. George's town with the fleet anchoring at Murray's Anchorage, off the northern shore off St. George's Island while construction began at Ireland Island. The lighthouse was never built, but the dockyard became a strategically important one for the navy during the wars of 1812–15. It first served as the winter headquarters and base for what was to become the North America and West Indies Station (with Halifax, Nova Scotia, filling these roles during the summers), but became the year-round headquarters, main-base and dockyard by the 1820s. The dockyard was expanded at the turn of the century by construction of a new South Yard. From this point, the original fortified yard has been known as the North Yard. Each of the yards has a long breakwater, or arm enclosing a camber. Although the main anchorage for the fleet was Grassy Bay (with Murray's Anchorage remaining a secondary anchorage), the area of water inside the mouth of the Great Sound between Ireland Island and Spanish Point, there was considerable space within the cambers for vessels as large as cruisers to berth on wharfs or the inner sides of the breakwaters. As Bermuda's porous limestone did not allow for a conventional drydock, a series of floating dry docks were also moored to the wharf inside the cambers from the 1860s.

With control of the western North Atlantic ceded to the allied United States Navy during the Second World War (when a United States Naval Operating Base, serving ships and flyingboats, was built on the Great sound, and United States Army Air Forces airbase Kindley Field at the East End) and subsequently under the North Atlantic Treaty Organisation (NATO), the Royal Naval Dockyard was reduced to a base in 1951 (with the ships based there required to return to Portsmouth for repairs). Most of Ireland Island, and the other Admiralty and War Office landholdings in Bermuda, were transferred to the colonial government in 1957, but the South Yard and adjacent areas continued to operate as a naval base titled HMS Malabar until the 1980s, when the last vessels based there were withdrawn and HMS Malabar became a supply station. The frigate designated as West Indies Guardship would visit on its way to the West Indies, and again on returning to Britain. Otherwise, HMS Malabar served as a supply station and berthing area for Royal Navy and NATO vessels transiting or exercising in the area until closing in 1995.

The Commissioner's House at the highest point atop The Keep (a fortress within the fortified North Yard) on the northern point of the island was home to a Royal Navy Wireless Station from 1939 to 1949 (another had been located since the First World War at Daniel's Head on Somerset Island, and was taken over by the Royal Canadian Navy from the 1960s 'til 1995 as CFS Bermuda, a transmitter location). Since the 1970s, the Bermuda Maritime Museum has occupied the Keep, including the Commissioner's House (and, following the end of the Millennium, also took possession of the Casemates Naval Barracks to expand into the national museum of the British Overseas Territory). Other than HMS Malabar and the maritime museum, Ireland Island was largely deserted after the 1950s, and many of the former naval buildings were becoming derelict by the 1980s when the colonial government formed a quango named the West End Development Company to attempt to draw businesses and visitors to the area.

The steady increase in size of the cruise liners visiting Bermuda during the summer months has meant that, since the start of the Millennium, few can fit through the narrow channels to St. George's Harbour and Hamilton Harbour and have instead berthed at the Royal Naval Dockyard. These liners are too large to enter either of the dockyard's cambers (previously, large liners such as the Queen Elizabeth 2 and SS Canberra, like naval battleships and aircraft carriers, had anchored at Grassy Bay), and the Government of Bermuda has consequently built a wharf on the outer, Grassy Bay, side of the northern breakwater. This wharf, which has proved vulnerable to storms, has been titled King's Wharf. The presence of most of Bermuda's tourism visitors there has turned the Royal Naval Dockyard into a busy pleasure town, albeit few people actually reside on Ireland Island. A number of buildings around the dockyard have been taken down since the 1990s, and a new prison was constructed on the western side of Ireland Island North (west of the South Yard north of the Moresby Plain athletic field, and below and south of the Casemates Naval Barracks (which had previously been pressed into use as a prison after being taken over from the Admiralty by the colonial government).

WEDCO has allowed many the naval residences there to fall into dereliction, with Victoria Row (terraced married quarters) demolished in 2016, and the protected status of Albert Row in the process of being removed in 2020 to enable the same fate. The naval chaplain's residence, restored in the 1980s by Edward C. Harris of the Bermuda Maritime Museum, was taken over by WEDCO in the 1990s. The ruin of the single Mechanics' Quarters on Maria Hill have been swallowed by a forest of invasive species. Other buildings on Ireland Island South had been destroyed before WEDCO's creation, including the Royal Naval Hospital (although the adjacent isolation hospital for infectious diseases survives).

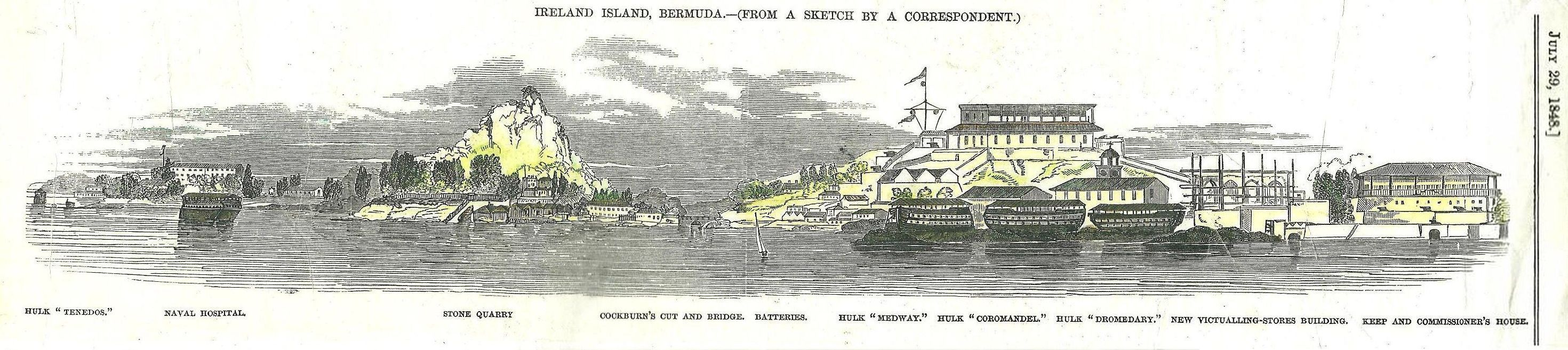
1848 Woodcut of HMD Bermuda, Ireland Island, Bermuda.
