= Darrell's Island, Bermuda =

Island in the Great Sound of Bermuda

Coordinates: 32°16′30.27″N 64°49′15.94″W

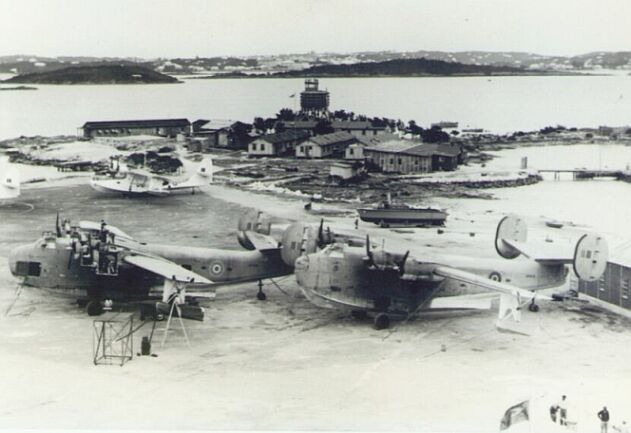
RAF Darrell's Island during World War II.

Darrell's Island is a small island within the Great Sound of Bermuda. It lies in the southeast of the sound, and is in the north of Warwick Parish. The island is owned by the Bermuda Government.

== Early history ==
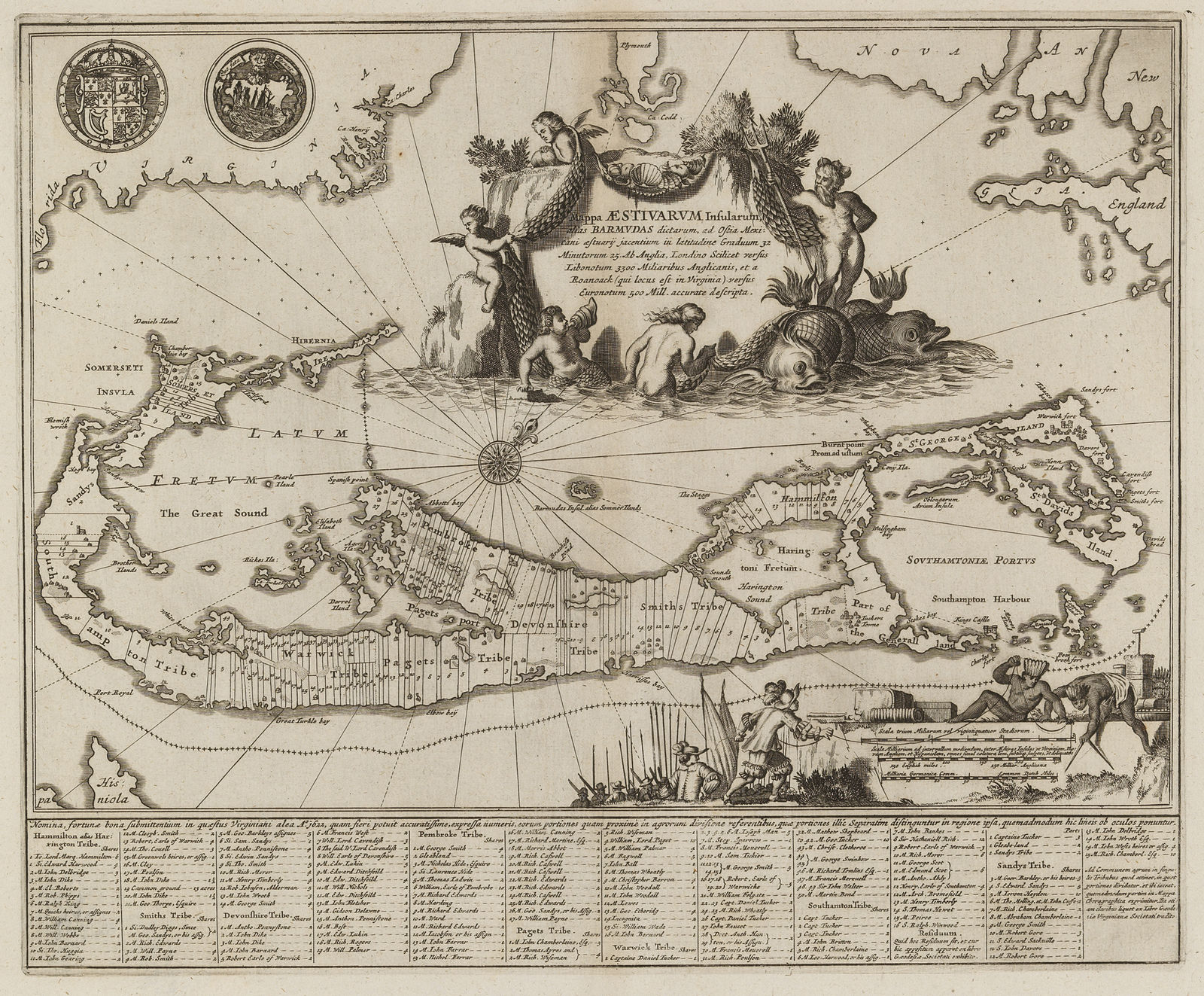
Richard Norwood's 1621 map of Bermuda

The 1621 version of Richard Norwood's map of Bermuda shows Darrell's Island at that time appears to have been called Captain Tucker's Island ("Ca. Turker Iland") presumably for Captain Daniel Tucker (Governor of Bermuda from 1616 to 1619). What is now known as Hinson's Island is shown on the same map as Darrell's Island ("Dorrel Iland"). The islands of the Great Sound were part of the Royal Naval land purchases in Bermuda following the American War of Independence. The Royal Navy used the islands for various purposes in the 19th century. Darrell's Island was also used as a quarantine station. During the Second Boer War, it was used (along with several of its neighbours) as a prisoner of war camp.

== Modern history ==
In 1936, Imperial Airways built an air station on Darrell's Island. This operated as a staging point on scheduled trans-Atlantic flights by Imperial Airways and Pan American. The island was taken over as Royal Air Force Bermuda during the Second World War. After the war, it returned to civil operation until air services moved to new land-based facilities at Kindley Field (now Bermuda International Airport).

Darrell's Island was briefly used for film location work in the 1950s, most notably for the production of the 1956 television series Crunch and Des, starring Forrest Tucker and Sandy Kenyon, among other actors, some of which wished to remain on the island.

== See also ==
- Royal Air Force, Bermuda, 1939-1945
- Royal Naval Dockyard, Bermuda
