= Island Press =

U.S. non-profit environmental publisher

- Founded: 1978
- Founders: Catherine Conover, Barbara Dean, Charles Savitt, Walter Sedgwick
- Country of origin: United States
- Headquarters location: Washington, D.C.
- Distribution: Chicago Distribution Center (US); UBC Press (Canada); Marston Book Services (EMEA); New South Books (Australia)
- Key people: David Miller, President
- Publication types: Books
- Nonfiction topics: natural history, ecology, and conservation
- Official website: islandpress.org

Island Press is a nonprofit, environmental publisher based in Washington, D.C., United States, that specializes in natural history, ecology, conservation, and the built environment. Established in 1978, Island Press generates about half of its revenue through sales and half through donations by organizations and individuals.

== History ==
Island Press originated in northern California in 1978 as a publisher of books on the human relationship to the natural world. In 1984, the press re-organized to focus exclusively on books for people working on solutions to environmental problems, defined broadly to include the protection of biodiversity, land use planning, environmental issues related to international trade, and other topics. As part of this refocusing, Island Press moved its main office to Washington, D.C., where it remains today. The founders in 1984 were Catherine Conover, Walter Sedgwick, Barbara Dean, and Charles Savitt. Savitt stepped down as president on April 30, 2016. David Miller was named the new president.

Beginning with just a handful of titles per year and only three employees, Island Press has grown into a 30-person organization, governed by a 16-member Board of Directors comprising representatives from the scientific, philanthropic, academic, and conservation communities. Since 1984, Island Press has sold over 3 million books.

== Publishing ==
Today, Island Press publishes around 40 titles a year and has over 800 titles in its library covering topics that range from ecosystem services to ecological restoration to climate change adaptation to conservation and the built environment. Its books are published around the world in over 15 languages including Chinese, Spanish, Korean, Japanese, Italian, and Macedonian.

Throughout the 1980s, Island Press's title list focused primarily on books for environmental professionals and academics, with much of its focus on ecosystem-based management and ecosystem services movements. By the start of the 1990s, the press started to think seriously about how to reach a broader audience. The result was the creation of the imprint Shearwater Books in 1992. From its inception, Shearwater was intended as a forum for books that explore the interrelationships of nature, science, and human culture through literary non-fiction, biography, and cultural anthropology. In 1994, Island Press and Shearwater published The Naturalist, the book from Pulitzer Prize-winner E.O. Wilson, which the Los Angeles Times called, "...one of the finest scientific memoirs ever written, by one of the finest scientists writing today". Over the years, Island Press has expanded its interest areas by offering books on old-growth forests, renewable energy, the built environment, and marine conservation. In addition to E.O. Wilson, Island Press has worked with a wide array of scientists, policymakers, and conservationists including Paul R. Ehrlich, Donald Kennedy, Joseph J. Romm, Jay Inslee, Peter Gleick, Jan Gehl, Peter Calthorpe, Bill McKibben, Allen Hershkowitz and Robert Glennon.

In October of 2025, Island Press' board approved a plan that saw Island Press become an imprint of Princeton University Press.

== Programs ==
Around the mid-1990s, thanks in part to foundation grants made to the organization, as well as emerging interest in the environmental field, Island Press was able to expand its impact by incorporating several programmatic elements to complement topic areas explored in its print publications. Supported by this influx of both funding and public attention to the field, Island Press began organizing a series of technical assistance and training courses designed to help organizations and professionals strengthen their communication and achieve their goals. Currently, Island Press has several ongoing programs geared towards specific fields and titles, the most recent include:

=== CAKE: Climate Adaptation Knowledge Exchange ===
Island Press, with their partner EcoAdapt, launched the Climate Adaptation Knowledge Exchange (CAKE) website on July 4, 2010. CAKE is an online community for adaptation practitioners containing a database of case studies, adaptation literature, and professionals working on climate adaptation. It is geared toward people actively working to manage the natural environment in the face of climate change, as well as people wanting to learn more about adaptation in general. CAKE's growing community of practitioners includes conservation biologists, fish and wildlife managers, restoration ecologists, resource and land managers, planners, professors and researchers, policy analysts, and environmental advocates. By providing a forum to share information across sectors and disciplines, its ultimate goal is to encourage the development of policies, science, and management approaches that will reduce the vulnerability of both natural systems and human communities to climate change. CAKE's user-generated content includes a calendar of events as well as an opportunities board with listings from around the world. In addition, CAKE's resources are georeferenced and connect case studies, virtual library documents, and expert adaptation-planning advice with tools and an international directory of professionals and organizations practicing climate change adaptation.

=== Conservation Finance Boot Camp ===
In June 2007, the Yale Center for Business and the Environment held its first Conservation Finance Boot Camp and has held one each year since. Island Press published three of the textbooks for this course, and in 2010 sponsored the first Western Conservation Finance Boot Camp at Stanford University. These week-long training camps provide the most up-to-date innovative and successful tools and financing techniques available for conservationists. Each camp also has specific focus areas, such as energy and mitigation funding, conservation development, or finding new sources of funding for land conservation during a recession.

=== Local Initiatives ===
In 2010, Island Press launched a local event series in Seattle and the Bay Area to get experts and their messages in front of a broad network of constituents. For Seattle, it partnered with Town Hall Seattle for the Soundings from Island Press Series, which in 2010 included eight author-speaking events and one panel focusing on "Our Future: Walkable Urbanism." Island Press also launched the Bay Area program with a speaking event for Peter Gleick and his book Bottled and Sold at the California Academy of Sciences in September 2010. In 2011, Island Press brought both Peter Calthorpe and Tim Beatley to speak at the California Academy of Sciences. These initiatives aim to improve understanding and awareness of environmental issues in each location. They are anchored on cultivating partnerships with major venues, academic institutions, corporations, and media outlets, as well as on outreach to leaders in policy, business, and planning. To bring together local business and civic leadership, media, and citizenry to engage in issues, activities include public speaking engagements, editorial board visits, presentations, and panel discussions. In the near future, Island Press plans to expand these local initiatives to include New York, Chicago, and Boston.
