= Edward Harris (archaeologist) =

Bermudian archaeologist

Edward Cecil Harris, MBE, JP, FSA is a prominent Bermudian archaeologist. He is best known for the "Harris matrix", developed in February 1973 and considered by some to be the "industry standard" for stratigraphic archaeology. This was followed by a five-year investigation into archaeological practices. He determined that the methods did not properly account for stratigraphy, and published his findings in 1979 as the Principles of Archaeological Stratigraphy.

While attending Columbia University School of General Studies in the United States, Harris spent the summers assisting on archaeological digs in Winchester, England. After graduating, he continued his archaeological work, including in Bergen, Norway and along the Persian Gulf. In 1997 he worked towards a PhD through the University of London, while working on excavations in New Guinea.

In 1982, Harris became a Fellow of the Society of Antiquaries of London, and in 1991 he became a Fellow at the John Carter Brown Library at Brown University. Outside of academia, Harris has been awarded the Palmetto Award by the Bermuda National Trust, for his efforts in the historical preservation of several buildings in 1994. In Bermuda, Harris served as the executive director of the National Museum of Bermuda, and writes a history column, entitled "Heritage Matters", for the local newspaper. He is a frequent contributor to the annual Bermuda Journal of Archaeology and Maritime History, and has served as its editor.

== Publications ==
- Principles of Archaeological Stratigraphy (1979, now available free on the internet in 8 languages)
- Pillars of the Bridge (1991)
- Practices of Archaeological Stratigraphy (1993, now available free on the internet in English)
- Bermuda Forts 1612-1957 (1997)

== Articles in BJAMH ==
Articles in the Bermuda Journal of Archaeology and Maritime History. In 2001, he held the position of editor.

- "Bermuda Defences at the End of the American Revolutionary War" (1989)
- "A History of Some of the Islands in St. George's Harbour" (1991) with J. C. Arnell
- "The 1991 Archaeological Field Season at Fort Cunningham, Bermuda" (1991) with Richard A. Gould and John R. Triggs
- "Review of The Geological Map of Bermuda" (1991)
- "The 1992 Archaeological Field Season at Fort Cunningham, Bermuda" (1992) with Richard A. Gould and John R. Triggs
- "The 1993 Archaeological Investigations at Castle Island, Bermuda" (1994)
- "Archaeology of the King's Castle Island, Bermuda: The 1994 and 1995 Seasons" (1996) with Norman F. Barka and Heather M. Harvey
- "The Archaeology of Daniel's Island Fort, Bermuda" (1996) with Norman F. Barka
- "War and Peace: Historic Fortifications and Heritage Education in the Age of Cultural Tourism" (1998)
- "The Archaeology of Paget Fort—Bermuda's First Fort" (1999)
