= National Museum of Bermuda =

Maritime museum in Bermuda

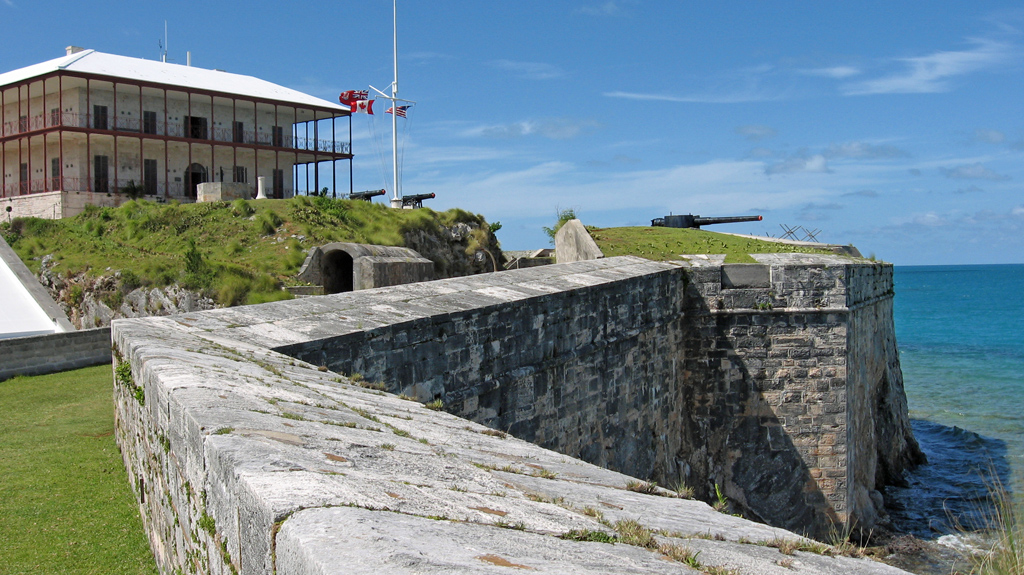
- Commissioner's House and ramparts
- Former name: Bermuda Maritime Museum
- Established: 1974
- Location: 1, The Keep, Sandys, MA 01, Bermuda
- Coordinates: 32°19′24″N 64°44′14″W
- Type: National museum
- Executive director: Elena Strong
- Website: nmb.bm

The National Museum of Bermuda, previously the Bermuda Maritime Museum from its opening in 1974 until 2009 (legislatively formalised in 2013), explores the maritime and island history of Bermuda. The maritime museum is located within the grounds of the fortress Keep of the former Royal Naval Dockyard in Sandys Parish on the Ireland Island at the western end of Bermuda. The museum publishes a number of books relating to Bermuda's history.

== History ==
After the English colonies in North America had established their independence, Bermuda was developed as a major British naval base to control the sea lanes to North America. The Dockyard construction started in 1809 and continued for a century. Buildings of the Keep were constructed using the local limestone. Work was done initially by slaves, later by convicts, prisoners, and laborers imported from the West Indies. The dockyard closed in the late fifties, and buildings started to fall into disrepair. In 1974 the Bermuda Maritime Museum took over the site of the Keep and restoration began.

The museum changed its name in 2009 to reflect its broader national focus; this name change was formalised in 2013 after an amendment was made to the museum's Act.

== Buildings ==
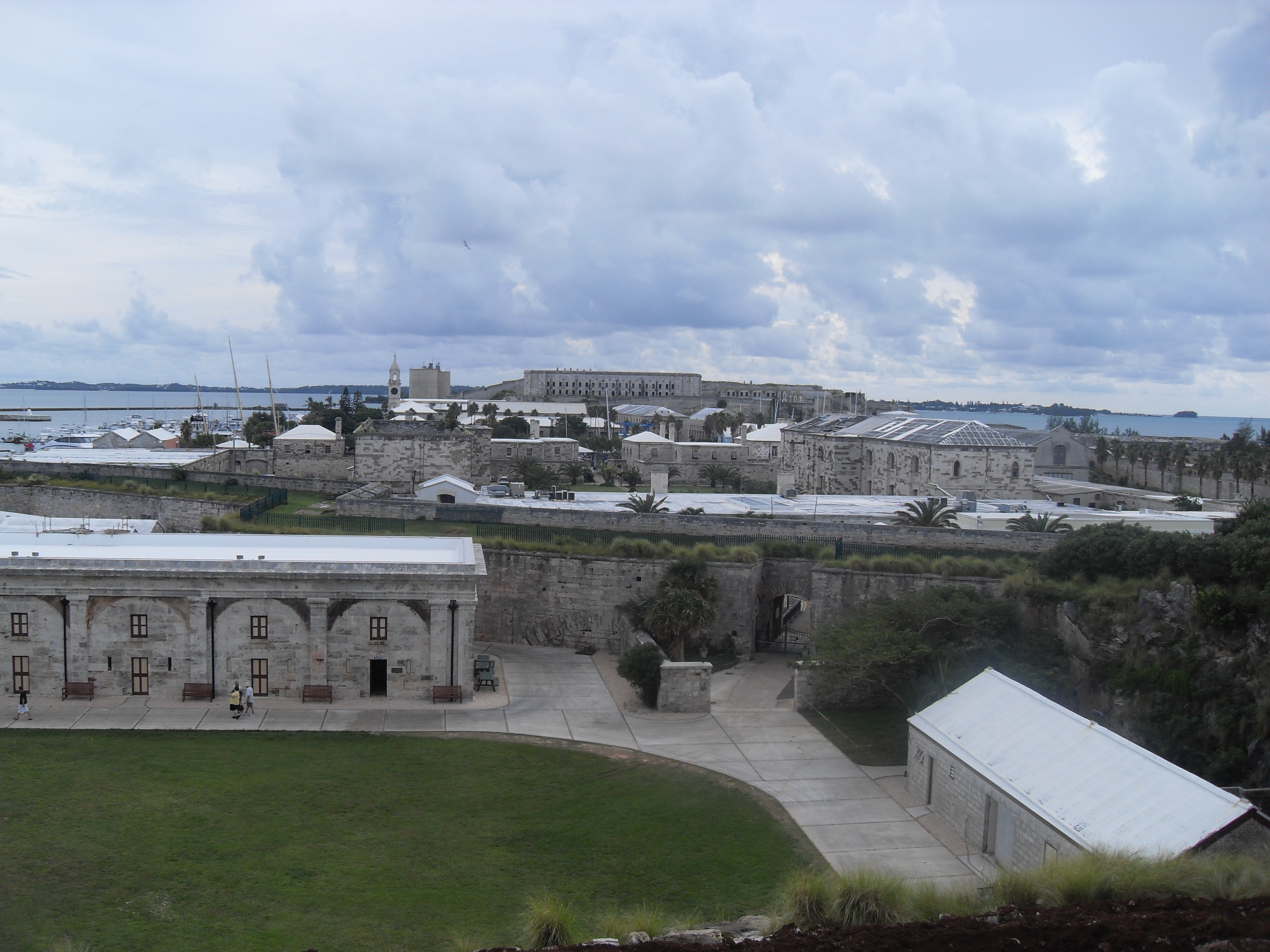
View from the Commissioner's House over the Keep Yard towards the 1850 Ordnance House and the entry of the museum

The 10-acre (40,000 m^{2}) Keep of the dockyard was its citadel and arsenal and protected it against potential attacks from land or sea. Defenses include bastions "A" to "G", ramparts and casemats, equipped with numerous guns including now displayed 24-pounder and 32-pounder carronades, 6-inch shell guns and 8-inch (200 mm) magazine breech-loading guns. The Keep Yard is surrounded on three sides by buildings and magazines; the fourth side is the location of a statue of Neptune. The 1837 Shifting House once stored muskets and gunpowder. Among the storage facilities are the 1850 Ordnance Building that stored 4,860 kegs of gunpowder on a floor of non-sparking bitumen, the 1852 Ordnance House, and the 1853/1890 Ordnance House. The 1870 High Cave magazine is located above a now flooded cave. The Commissioner's House takes a commanding position at the center of the Keep. Designed by Edward Holl, it was erected within five years in the 1820s as the world's first residence using prefabricated cast-iron for its structural framework. It decayed after the departure of the British, but after the museum took control in 1974, it has been restored over a period of 25 years.

== Exhibits ==
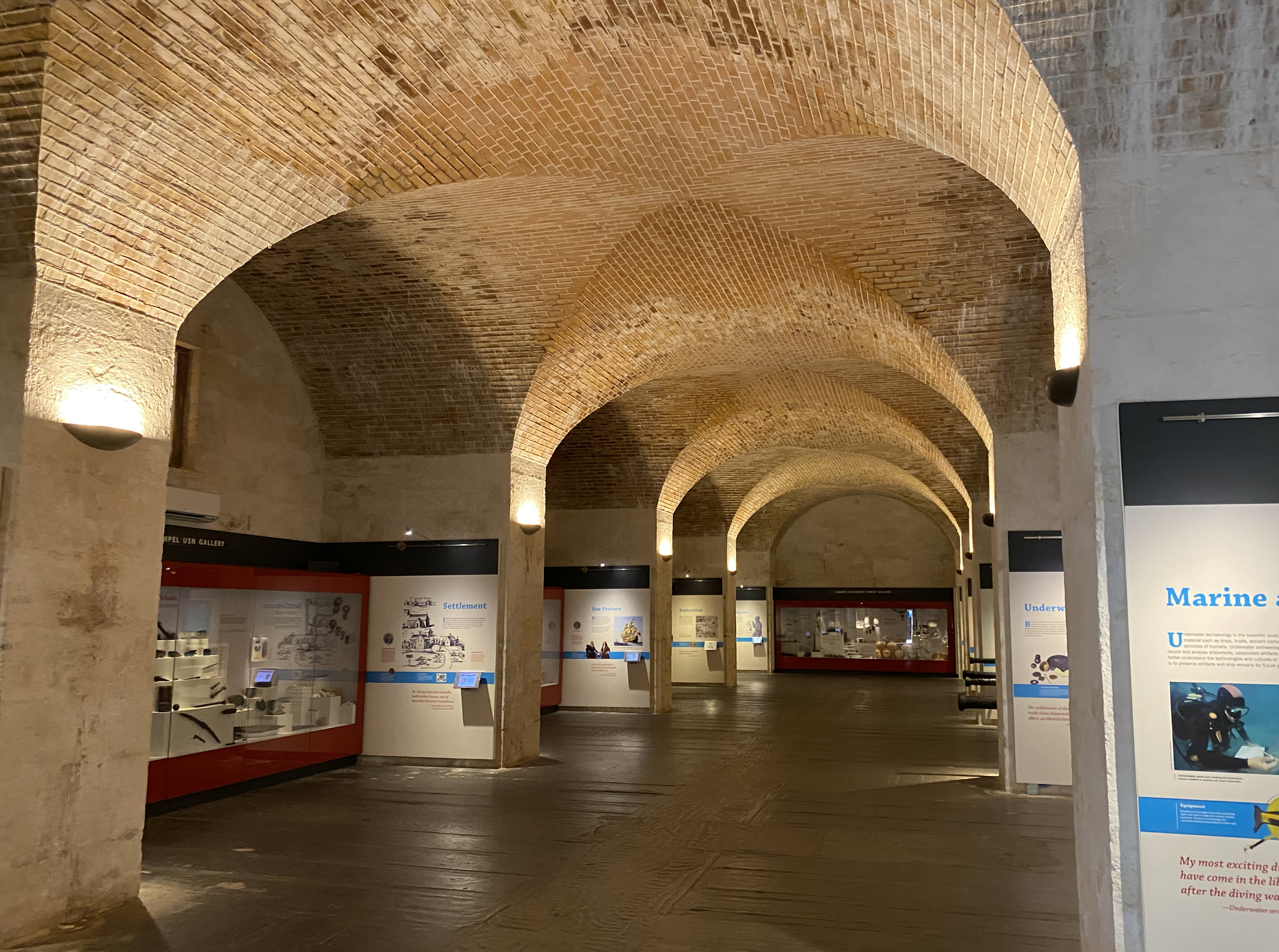
A showroom

The Commissioner's House is used to display a number of exhibitions. The basement shows Bermuda's Defence Heritage, a display about Bermuda's defenses and fortifications since 1612, and the role of local forces in World War I and World War II (this is devoted only to the British aspect of Bermuda's naval and military history, although there is a separate exhibit devoted to the United States bases). The pillared hall is site of a two-storey History of Bermuda mural by the Bermudian artist Graham Foster. The main floor has a number of themes related to Bermuda's history including slavery, immigration, and tourism. One room is dedicated to the history of the Bermuda Race. The upper floor contains collections of maps, books, coins, maritime art, and exhibits concerning activities of the Royal Navy and the US Forces, specifically during World War II. Other buildings show shipwreck artifacts, local watercraft, or are under renovation (2009).

The High Cave magazine displays artifacts relating to prisoners from the Boer Wars, and World Wars I and II.

A small building, the Dainty/ 1906 RA Store, shows yacht Dainty, once a local participant of the Bermuda Race, that was built more than a century ago and at least three-times restored.

The Keep Pond once used to transport ammunition from outside anchored ships to the fortress is now home of the Dolphin Quest, a place where visitors can interact with dolphins.

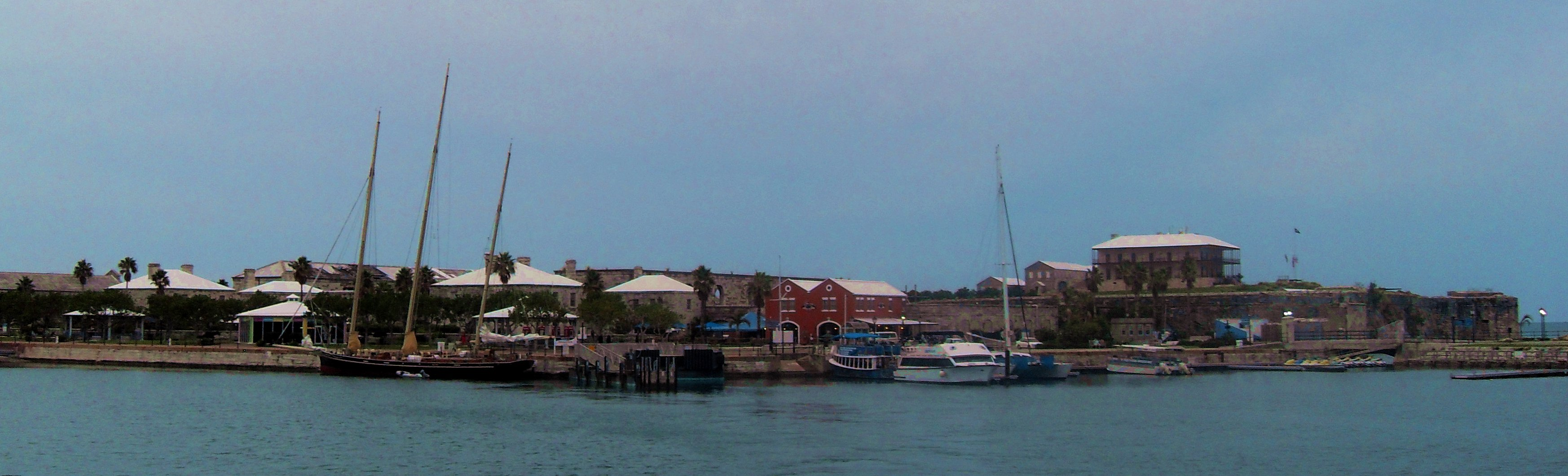
View of the museum, the former Keep, with the Commissioner's House on the right, from the dockyard harbour

== Film ==
The 1850 Ordnance Building interior, also called the Queen's Exhibition Hall, appeared as the fictitious 'Hamilton Library' in the 1977 adventure movie The Deep. The scene, starring Jacqueline Bisset and Nick Nolte, was filmed in October 1976, at the location of the real Tucker Cross crime scene. The emerald-studded 22 karat gold cross had been discovered stolen when Queen Elizabeth II came to name the building on February 17, 1975. Bermudian explorer, Teddy Tucker, appears in cameo during the film.

== See also ==
- Architecture of Bermuda
