= Attorney General Gray =

Attorney General Gray may refer to:

- John Hamilton Gray (New Brunswick politician) (1814–1889), Attorney General of the Province of New Brunswick
- George Gray (Delaware politician) (1840–1925), Attorney General of Delaware
- Reginald Gray (barrister) (1851–1935), Attorney-General of Bermuda
- Samuel Brownlow Gray (1823–1910), Attorney-General of the Bermudas
- Frederick Thomas Gray (1918–1992), Attorney General of Virginia
- Robert Isaac Dey Gray (1772–1804), acting Attorney General of Upper Canada

== See also ==
- General Gray (disambiguation)
