= Reginald Appleby =

English lawyer

Reginald Appleby CBE VD
- Reginald Appleby
- Born: 18 September 1865; Portsea Island, Hampshire, England
- Died: 30 August 1948 (aged 82); Doctor's Hospital, New York City, New York, US
- Military career
- Allegiance: United Kingdom of Great Britain and Ireland
- Branch: Army
- Rank: Major
- Unit: Bermuda Volunteer Rifle Corps
- Conflicts: World War I
- Awards: CBE, VD
- Other work: Lawyer

Reginald Woodifield Appleby CBE VD (18 September 1865 – 30 August 1948) was an English lawyer, practising in Bermuda, who in 1898 founded the predecessor of the law firm that now trades as Appleby. He served as a major in the Bermuda Volunteer Rifle Corps during the First World War, and was a member of the Legislative Council of Bermuda.

== Early life and family ==
Reginald Appleby was born at Portsea Island, Hampshire, England, in 1865 to George Walton Appleby of Durham and Agnes Sterry Tucker of Tankfield, Paget East, Bermuda. The Tucker family is one of Bermuda's oldest, having been established from the arrival of Captain Daniel Tucker as Governor of the English colony (1616–1619).

His parents had married at St. Paul's Church (Church of England), Paget, on 8 September 1859. His father, at the time, resided in Pembroke, Bermuda, and was an officer in the 26th (Cameronian) Regiment of Foot, into which he had been commissioned as an ensign with seniority from 18 August 1854, and promoted to lieutenant with seniority from 30 March 1855. His regiment served as part of the Bermuda Garrison from 1854 until October 1859 (with the Regimental Depot at Belfast, Ireland), after which it sailed to Portsmouth, before being posted to Dublin, Ireland. His father was described in the 1871 census as widowed and "Late Captain Landowner" and in 1881 as "Late Cpt 31st Regmt". Reginald had three brothers and a sister.

His mother was born in Pembroke, Bermuda, on the 5 May 1839, the daughter of Benjamin Jennings Tucker (appointed Commissioner of Pilotage in December 1840, and July 1843) and Catharine Dickinson Tucker. The Jennings family of Bermuda included the privateer Henry Jennings (died 1745). She died in 1870 and his father remarried, to Drusilla Matthews, his former servant who had been with the family when his first wife was alive. George and Drusilla gave Reginald several half-siblings.

Reginald Appleby married Edith Mary Gosling (from a family associated with wines and spirits merchant Gosling Brothers) at St. Paul's Church, in Paget, Bermuda, on 18 September 1899, and they had a daughter, Prudence Tucker (1905–1976), later Prudence Pearman. The family lived in Westmoreland, Pembroke Parish, Bermuda.

== Career ==
Appleby passed his final law exams in England in November 1887. He was in partnership with Reginald Gray, later Sir Reginald Gray, attorney-general of Bermuda, from 1893 to 1897 in Bermuda as Gray & Appleby. In 1898 he founded his own eponymous law firm. By 1903 he was a justice of the peace when he sat on the marine court of inquiry into the wreck of the S.S. Madiana. In 1938 he and Sir Dudley Spurling merged their practices to establish Appleby & Spurling. The year after Appleby's death in 1948, that firm merged with William Kempe to become Appleby Spurling Kempe (or Kemp), one of the predecessors of the firm that now trades as Appleby, the firm at the centre of the Paradise Papers leaks in 2017.

He served in the Bermuda Volunteer Rifle Corps (BVRC), commissioned as a second-lieutenant with seniority from 9 March 1895. In 1900 he was the acting adjutant, with the rank of captain. On 12 April 1901, the Officer Commanding Troops of the Bermuda Garrison received notification that the Governor and military Commander-in-Chief had appointed Captain R.W. Appleby, BVRC, to be a Captain with the Cadet Corps at Saltus Grammar School (dated 11 February). He was promoted to major on 5 November 1903, on becoming the commanding officer. In 1916 he was awarded the Volunteer Officers' Decoration. During the First World War, the BVRC fulfilled its role within the Bermuda Garrison while also sending a contingent of 88 other ranks under the command of Appleby's cousin, Captain Richard Jennings Tucker, to join the 1st Battalion of the Lincolnshire Regiment on the Western Front in June 1915. Appleby remained in command of the BVRC 'til succeeded by Major Richard Jennings Tucker (later lieutenant-colonel) in 1920 (another cousin, Lieutenant-Colonel AT Gosling, ED, was to be commanding officer from 1935 to 1941). The BVRC (renamed the Bermuda Rifles in 1949) was amalgamated with the Bermuda Militia Artillery to form the Royal Bermuda Regiment in 1965, with Lieutenant-Colonel John Brownlow Tucker, another cousin, becoming the first commanding officer).

He was appointed to the Legislative Council of Bermuda in 1928 and according to The Irish Times, citing reports in Bermuda's The Royal Gazette, spoke against the idea of the introduction of an income tax in Bermuda at a Legislative Council meeting in 1940, siding with "those who look on all income tax as man's last refinement of torture, to be resisted at all costs".

== Later life ==
Appleby was made a Commander of the Order of the British Empire in King George VI's 1947 New Year Honours for "Public services in Bermuda". He died on 30 August 1948 (aged 83) at Doctor's Hospital, New York, and was buried at Pembroke Cemetery in Bermuda.
