= Combined Cadet Force =

British military youth organisation, sponsored by the Ministry of Defence

Combined Cadet Force (CCF)
- Emblem of the CCF
- Founded: 1948
- Country: United Kingdom
- Allegiance: King Charles III
- Type: Youth Organisation
- Role: Leadership and discipline education
- Size: 42,720 Cadets
- Garrison/HQ: Regional Command Cadets Branch, Aldershot
- Nickname: 'The Corps' (within school environment)
- Website: combinedcadetforce.org.uk

Commanders
- Royal Air Force sections (as part of RAF Air Cadets): Air Commodore Allen Lewis, Commandant Air Cadets
- All sections otherwise: Each unit's Contingent Commander

Insignia
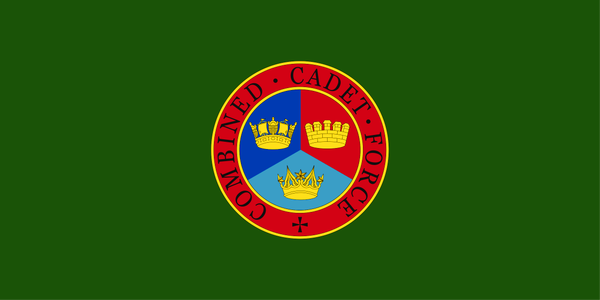
- Standard of the CCF

The Combined Cadet Force (CCF) is a youth organisation in the United Kingdom, sponsored by the Ministry of Defence (MOD), which operates in secondary schools and is subdivided into Royal Navy, Royal Marines, Army, and Royal Air Force sections. Its aim is to "provide a disciplined organisation in a school so that pupils may develop powers of leadership by means of training to promote the qualities of responsibility, self-reliance, resourcefulness, endurance and perseverance".

One of its objectives is "to encourage those who have an interest in the services to become Officers of the Regular or Reserve Forces", and a significant number of British military officers have had experience in the CCF.

Before 1948, cadet forces in schools existed as the junior division of the Officers' Training Corps framework, but in 1948 the Combined Cadet Force was formed to cover cadets affiliated with all three services. As of 2019, there were 42,720 cadets and 3,370 adult volunteers. The MOD provides approximately £28 million per year in funding to the CCF. Each school's unit is known as a contingent, and there were approximately 500 in the UK in 2021.

Although sponsored by the Ministry of Defence, the CCF is not part of the British Armed Forces or the Reserve Forces. As such, cadets and adult cadet leaders are not military personnel and are therefore not subject to military law or liable for military call-up. Some cadets do, however, go on to join the armed forces later in life, and many of the organisation's leaders have previously served as cadets or have a military background.

== History ==
On 12 May 1859, the Secretary of State for War, Jonathan Peel, sent a circular letter to public schools and universities inviting them to form units of the Volunteer Corps. The first school cadet corps was established at Rossall School in February 1860, initially as an army contingent only. Felsted already had an armed drill contingent at the time of the War Office letter under the command of Sergeant Major Rogers RM; its claim on these grounds to be the oldest school corps was upheld by Field Marshal Earl Roberts in a letter to the headmaster in 1904. In February 1861, the Oxford City Rifle Cadet Corps was founded with five companies, the first composed of pupils from Linden House School, a private school in Headington, and the second composed of pupils from Magdalen College School. In 1908, the units were redesignated as the Officer Training Corps (OTC).

The CCF was created in 1948 through the amalgamation of the Junior Training Corps (formerly the Junior Division of the Officers Training Corps) and the school contingents of the Sea Cadet Corps and Air Training Corps. CCF units are still occasionally referred to simply as "the Corps". A school contingent may include any combination of Royal Navy, Army, Royal Air Force, and sometimes Royal Marines sections; the Army section is invariably the largest.

=== Independent and state schools ===
The CCF movement was historically dominated by the independent sector, with around 200 contingents based in independent schools and only around 60 in state schools. Since the launch of the Cadet Expansion Programme in 2012, the number of contingents has increased to 500, surpassing the government's target. There are now more contingents in the state sector than in the independent sector. The expansion was funded by £50 million raised through fines imposed following the LIBOR scandal.

It was reported in 2008 that some independent school CCF detachments would be opened to pupils from local state schools. One example was Aldenham School in Watford, Hertfordshire, which linked its cadet force with the nearby state school Queens' School to form a joint cadet force.

=== Investigation into sexual abuse ===
In 2012, compensation payments made to victims of sexual abuse across all cadet forces, including the CCF, totalled £1,475,844. In 2013, payouts totalled £64,782, and in 2014 they totalled £544,213.

=== Identity ===
CCF contingents are part of the CCF but also form part of their respective schools and are therefore semi-autonomous organisations run by school staff or school-associated personnel, supported by armed forces personnel. Army sections may wear their own cap badge, while Royal Navy and Royal Air Force sections wear the appropriate RN or RAF other ranks' and officers' cap badges.

The CCF is separate from the Community Cadet Forces, namely the Sea Cadet Corps, the Army Cadet Force, the Air Training Corps, and the Volunteer Cadet Corps. Pupils normally join at the age of 12 or 13 (Year 8), although older pupils may also join at the discretion of the headteacher. Participation is open to both sexes.

== Uniform ==
=== Royal Navy Section ===
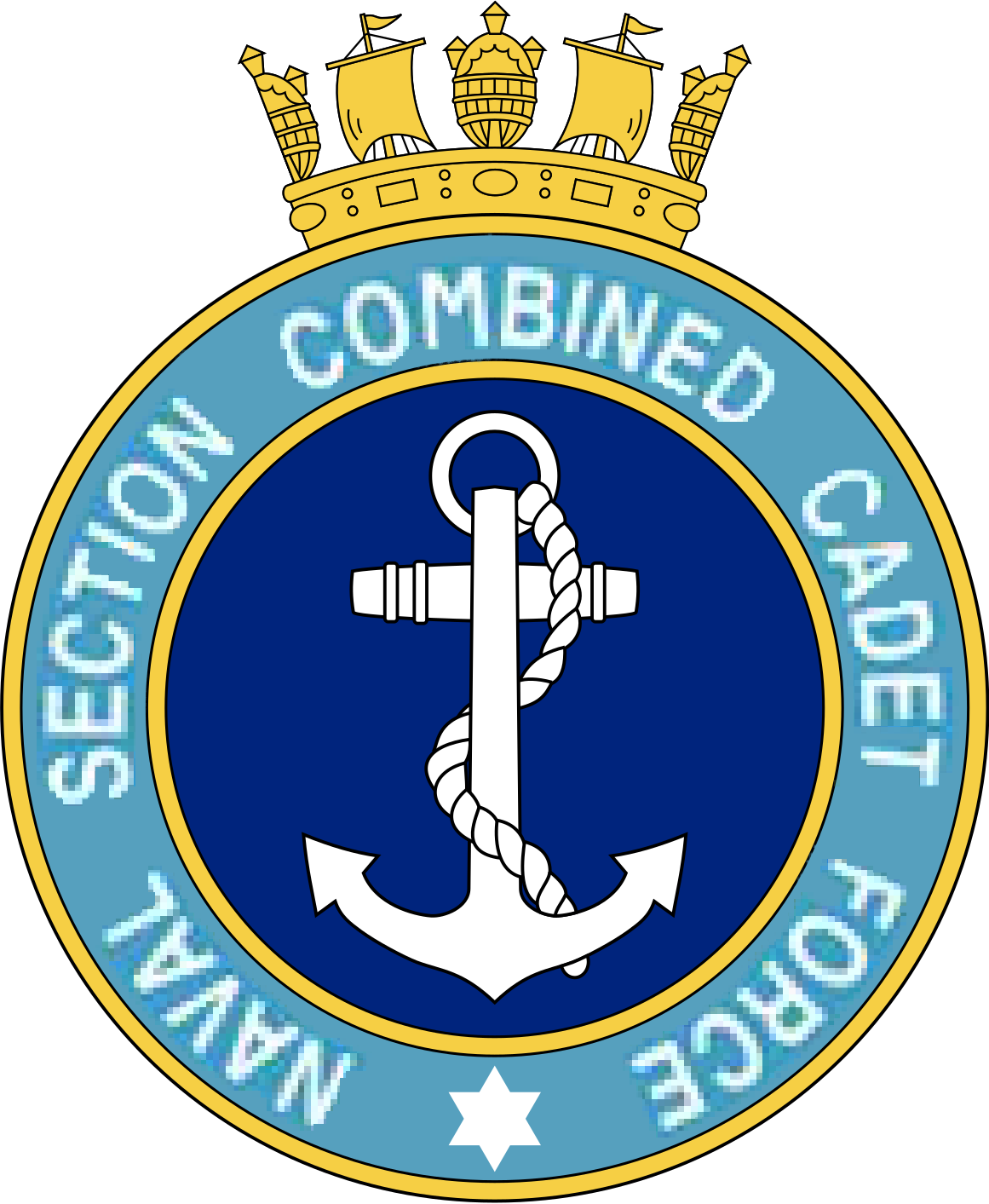
Badge of the Royal Navy section.

They may be issued with combat uniform if required and some schools have No 1 uniform for senior cadets. Number 3 uniform is normally the parade uniform for the CCF (RN) and consists of a white shirt, black tie, blue trousers, and blue heavy wool jersey, worn with plain black shoes; a brassard (armband) should be worn on the right arm, displaying qualification badges. Number 4 uniform is the standard working uniform of the Royal Navy, in one form or another it has been in existence for over 60 years. This uniform is fire-retardant and consists of a blue shirt, blue trousers, blue heavy wool jersey, beret, with CCF badge and black boots.

==== Royal Marines Section ====
Royal Marines sections wear the bronzed Royal Marines cap badge of other ranks with a red "tombstone" backing on a blue beret with MTP (Multi-Terrain Pattern) clothing, and either brown or black boots. They may also wear a version of No.1 Ceremonial Uniform with Cadet insignia for special occasions.

=== Army Section ===
Combined Cadet Force Army Stable Belt

Working uniform

The Army Section dress regulations are set out in Army Dress Regulations, Part 8 (Cadets). and Cadets wear the No. 8 Combat Dress – Multi-Terrain Pattern (MTP) uniform ('combats') for most occasions.

All cadets wear a rank slide with the word "CADET" in embroidered red capital letters at the top, any rank is then shown underneath in black. Cadets may be given permission to wear a stable belt of CCF, school, or affiliated unit pattern. Cadet Force Adult Volunteers (CFAVs) wear rank slides with "CCF" underneath.

Tactical Recognition Flashes are not to be worn by CFAVs or cadets of the Combined Cadet Force, irrespective of any affiliation to a Corps or Regiment. Cadets and CFAVs do wear county and contingent flashes.

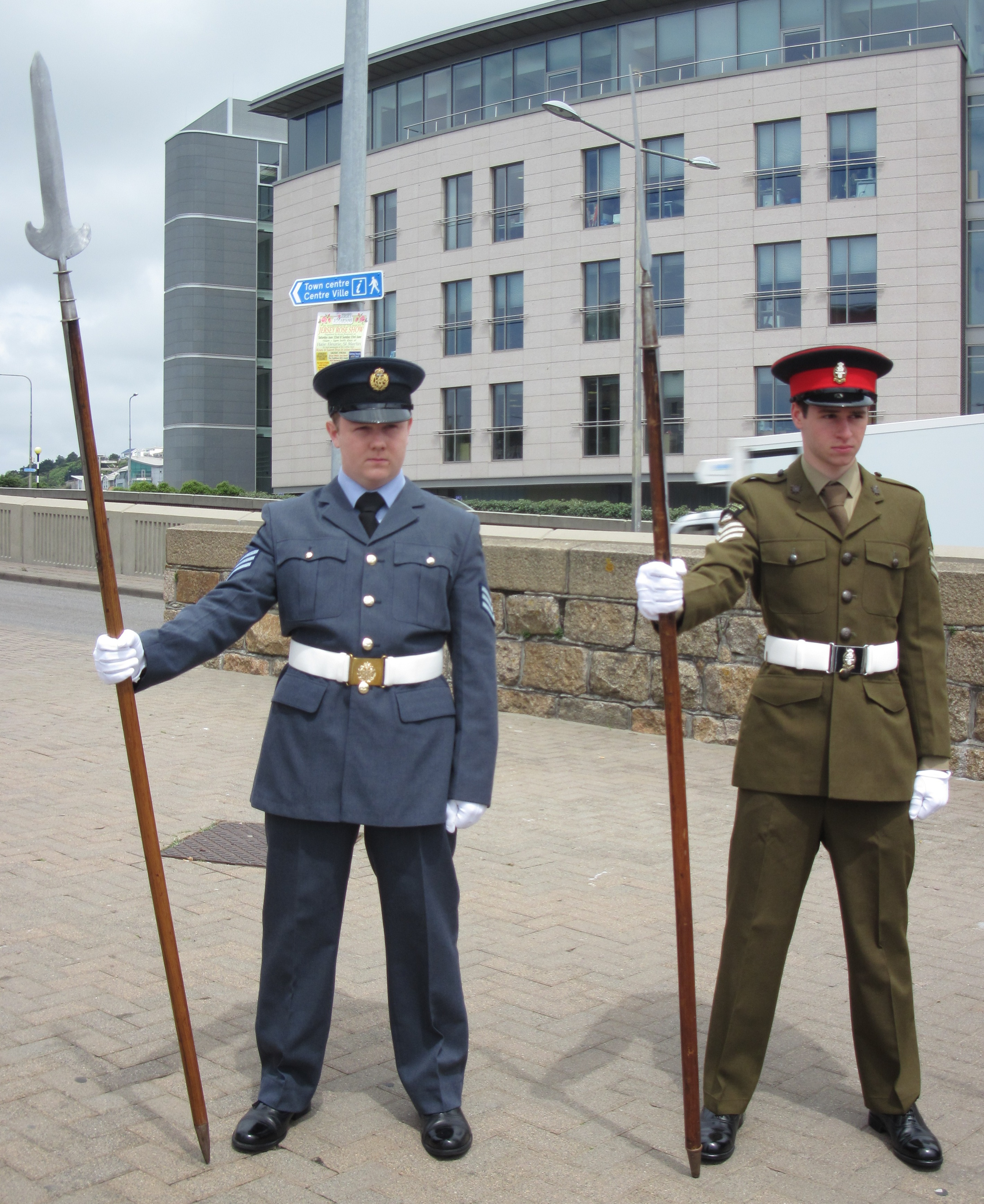
Cadets during commemorations in Jersey 2013. Showing the RAF Section No. 1 uniform (left) and Army Section No. 2 uniform (right)

=== Royal Air Force Section ===
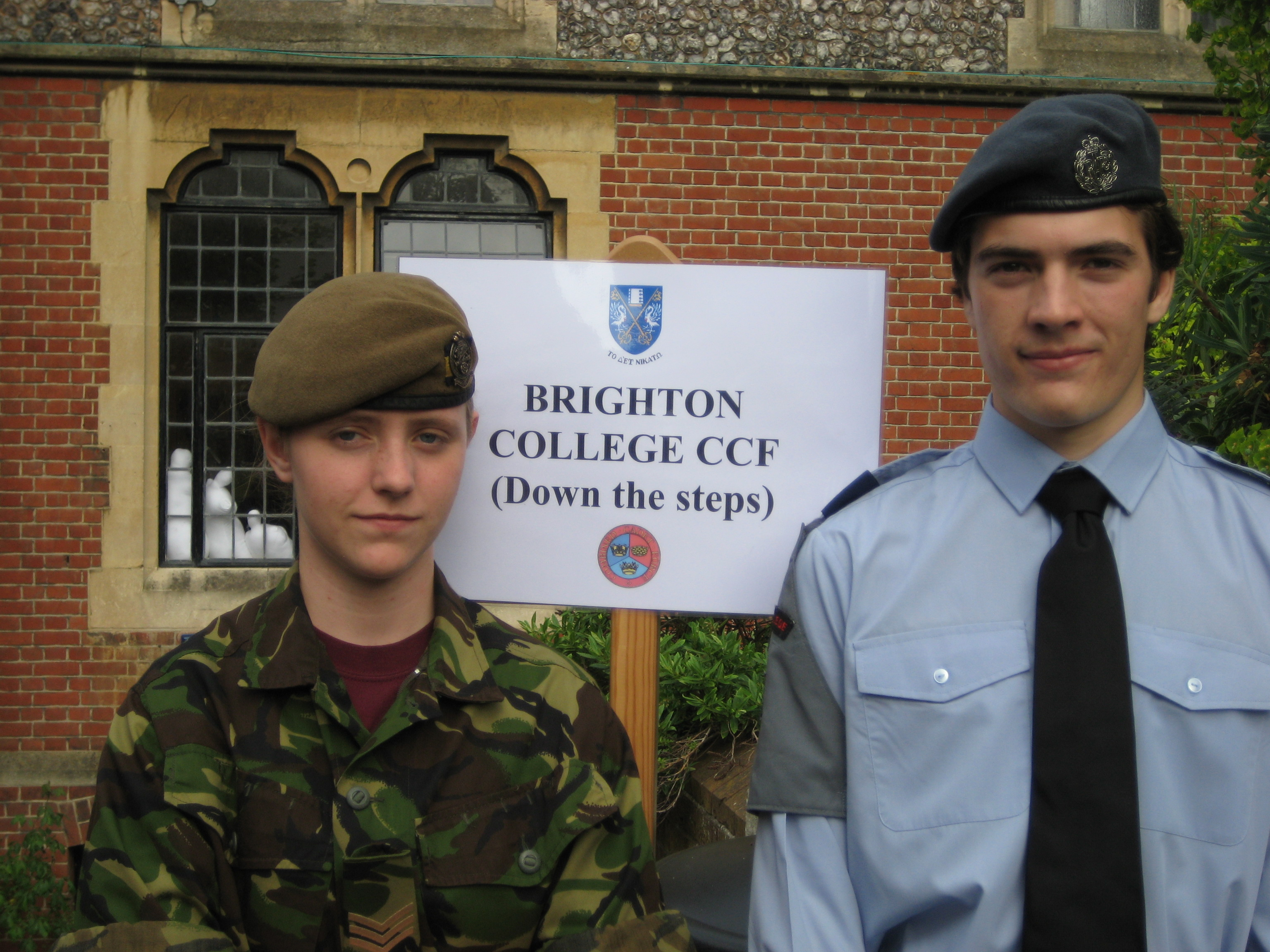
Brighton College CCF cadets in Army Section uniform left and RAF Section uniform right. Uniform berets have colours and cap badges of the armed forces they are affiliated to.

RAF cadets wear a version of the RAF No.2 dress. This consists of either light blue shirt and tie or a dark "working" blue shirt, blue-grey trousers or skirt/slacks, a blue-grey jumper: V-neck or round neck version, and an RAF blue beret with the RAF cap badge. They also wear a brassard to distinguish themselves as cadets. Except for the cap badge and brassard badge, this is identical to the uniform of the ATC and regulations for its wear are found in ACP1358. Most RAF sections wear combat clothing, formerly the CS95 DPM standard, but many now wear Multi-terrain pattern uniform (MTP). In 2024 the RAF Air Cadets adopted a new Tactical Recognition Flash (TRF) which features an eagle and the lettering "RAF" above the eagle, and "AIR CADETS" below the eagle, against the RAF TRF background. This new TRF is worn by all members of the organisation, staff and cadets.

== Cadets ==
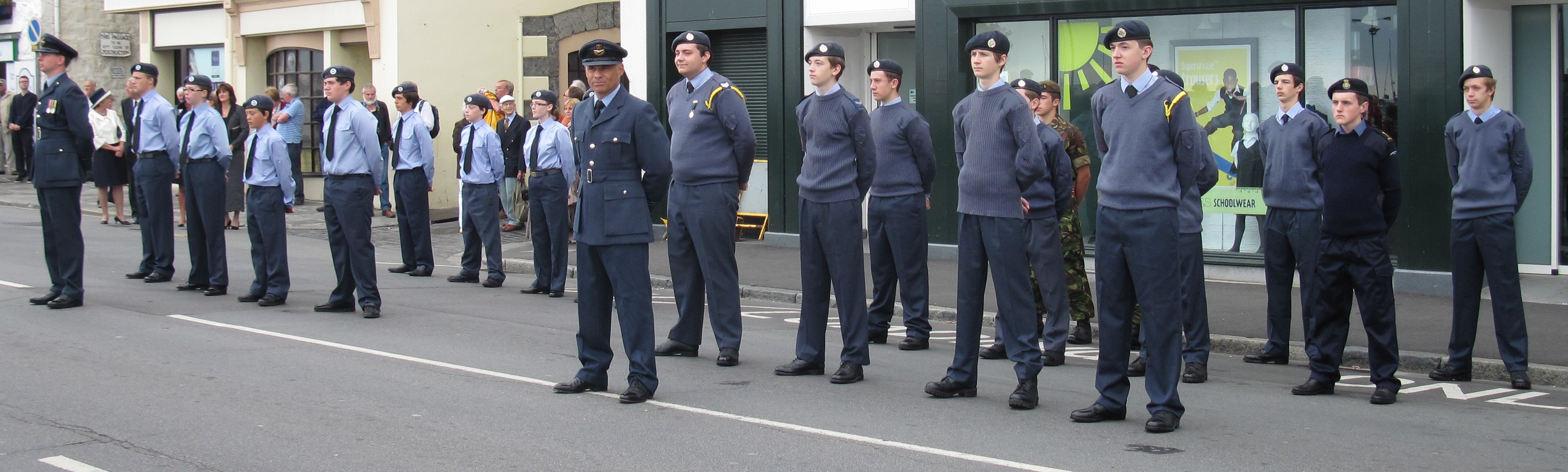
Parade and church service in Saint Peter Port, featuring ATC and CCF cadets, Guernsey, 16 September 2012

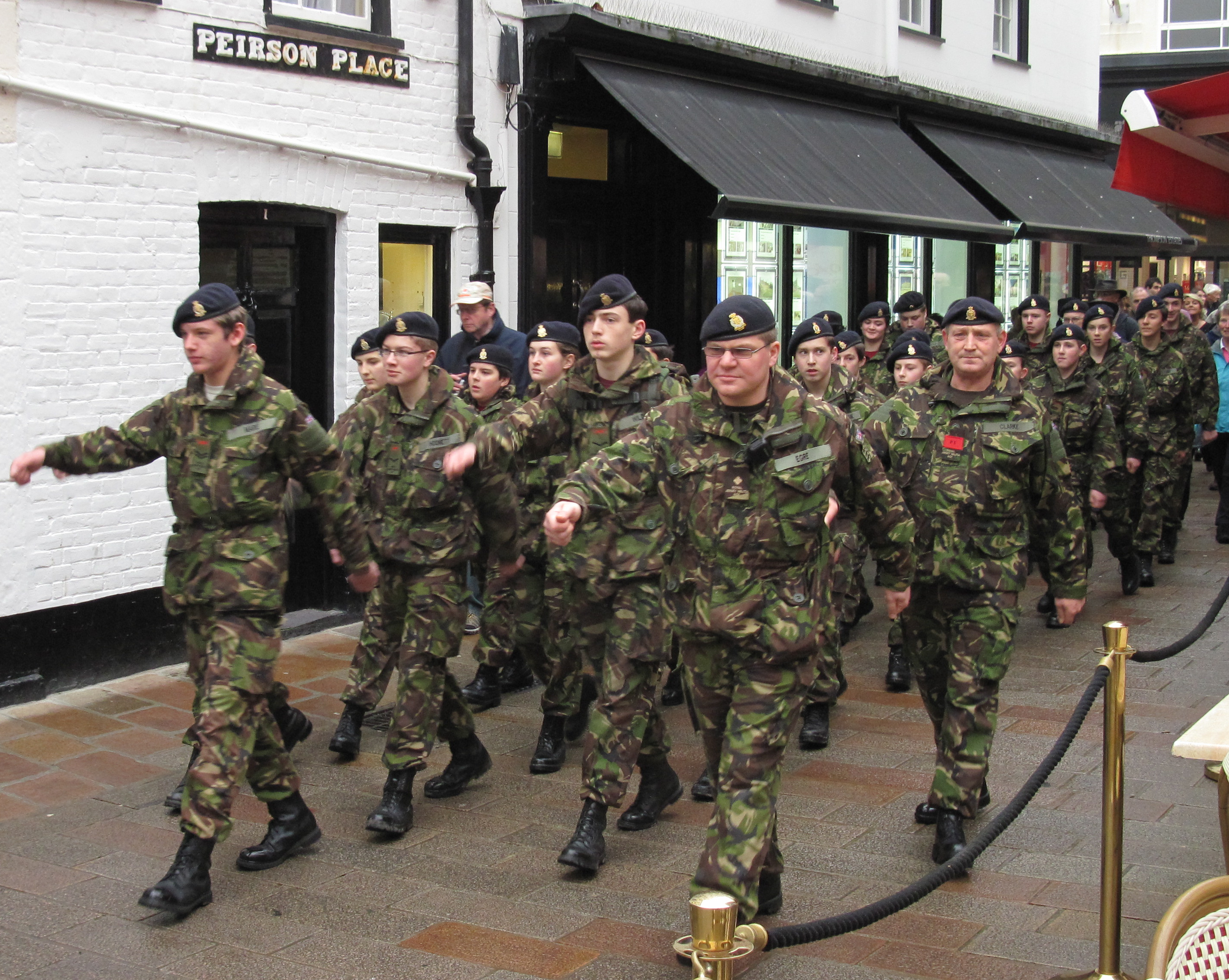
Army Cadet Force (ACF) Cadets during the Battle of Jersey commemoration in 2013

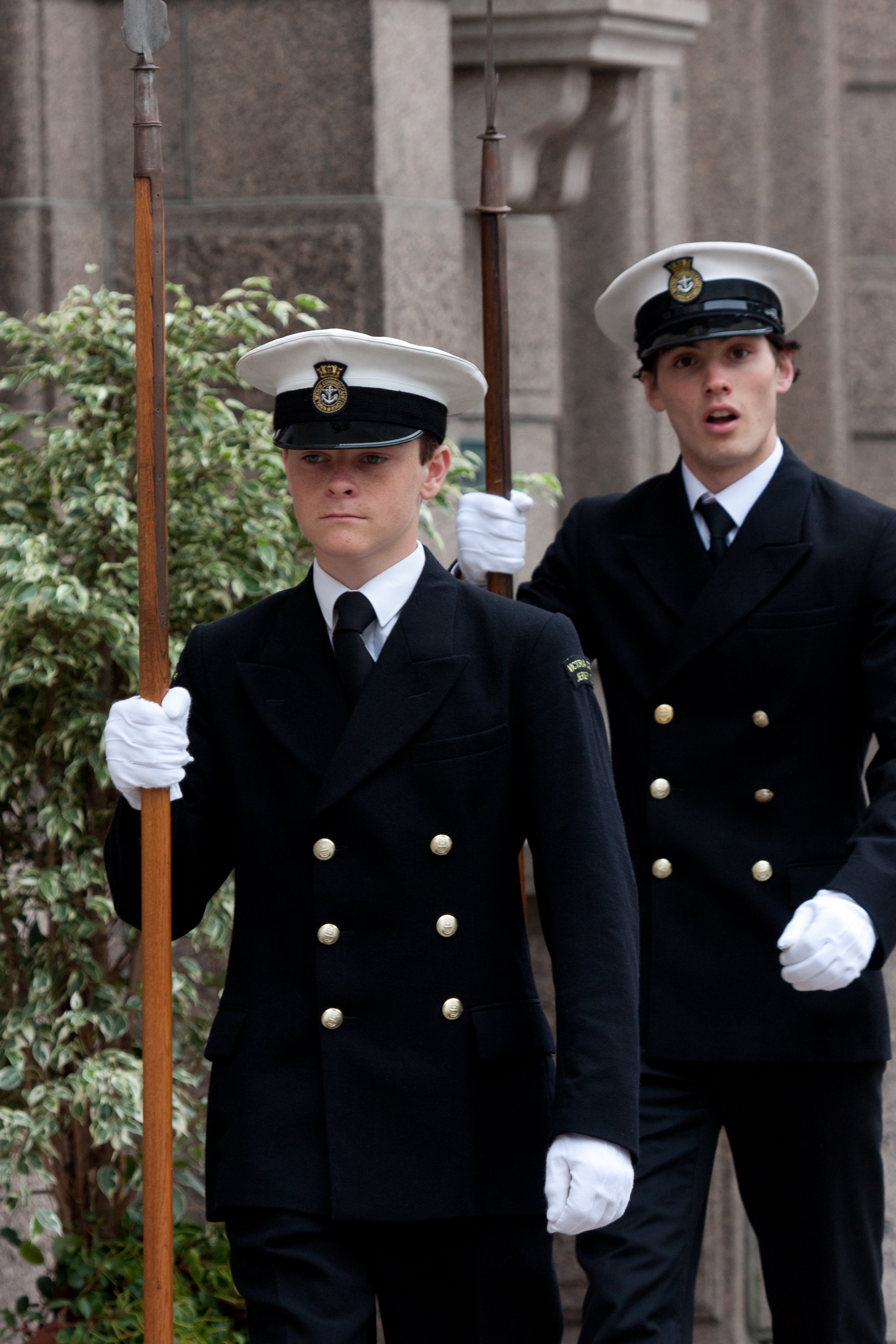
Royal Navy Cadets, during a Royal Visit at Victoria College, Jersey

The MOD Sponsored Cadet Forces Statistics are published annually. Statistics are provided for the Community Cadets (the Sea Cadet Corps and Volunteer Cadet Corps (VCC), Army Cadet Force (ACF) and Air Training Corps (ATC)) and the Combined Cadet Force. The Volunteer Cadet Corps (VCC) is included in these statistics for the first time, as its status changed to become the fifth MOD sponsored cadet force in 2017.

=== Number of CCF Cadets (nationwide) ===
The strength of CCF, both Cadets and CFAVs is published every year by the Office for National Statistics, usually in April.

As of April 2025 there were:

Size of sections
Section	Cadets
Army	34,120
Royal Air Force	10,190
RN/RM	6,040
Total	50,350

In November 2019 the Government announced that it had achieved its target of 500 contingents under the Cadet Expansion Programme (CEP)

=== Cadet ranks ===
All cadet ranks are standard non-commissioned ranks, prefixed by "Cadet". The highest rank depends on the size of the contingent, but are usually Cadet Regimental Sergeant Major, (Army and RM Sections) and Cadet Warrant Officer (RN and RAF Sections). Some contingents may have Junior (and sometimes Senior) Under Officers. Cadet Under Officers' rank badges are blue bands 12 mm wide across each shoulder slide, with the addition of the letters CCF underneath.

Cadets are promoted on their level of experience and their level of commitment to the cadet force. Also cadets are promoted on excellence or merit. Senior cadets' duty is to help the running of parades etc. and to help their Contingent Commander or another officer of their contingent.

The Naval Cadet that is in command of the naval section is also addressed as Coxswain.

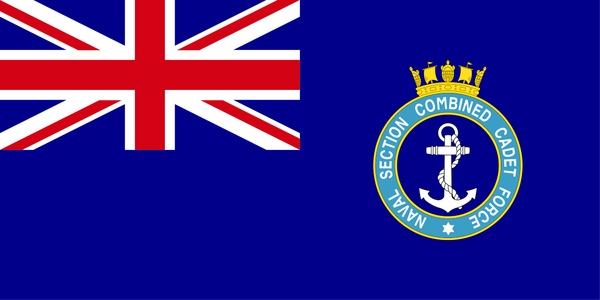
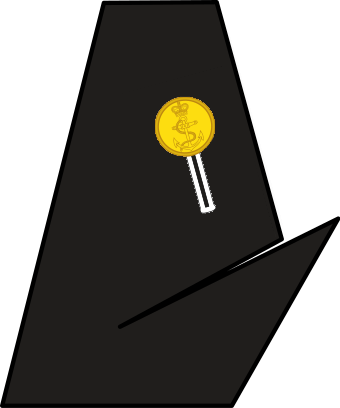
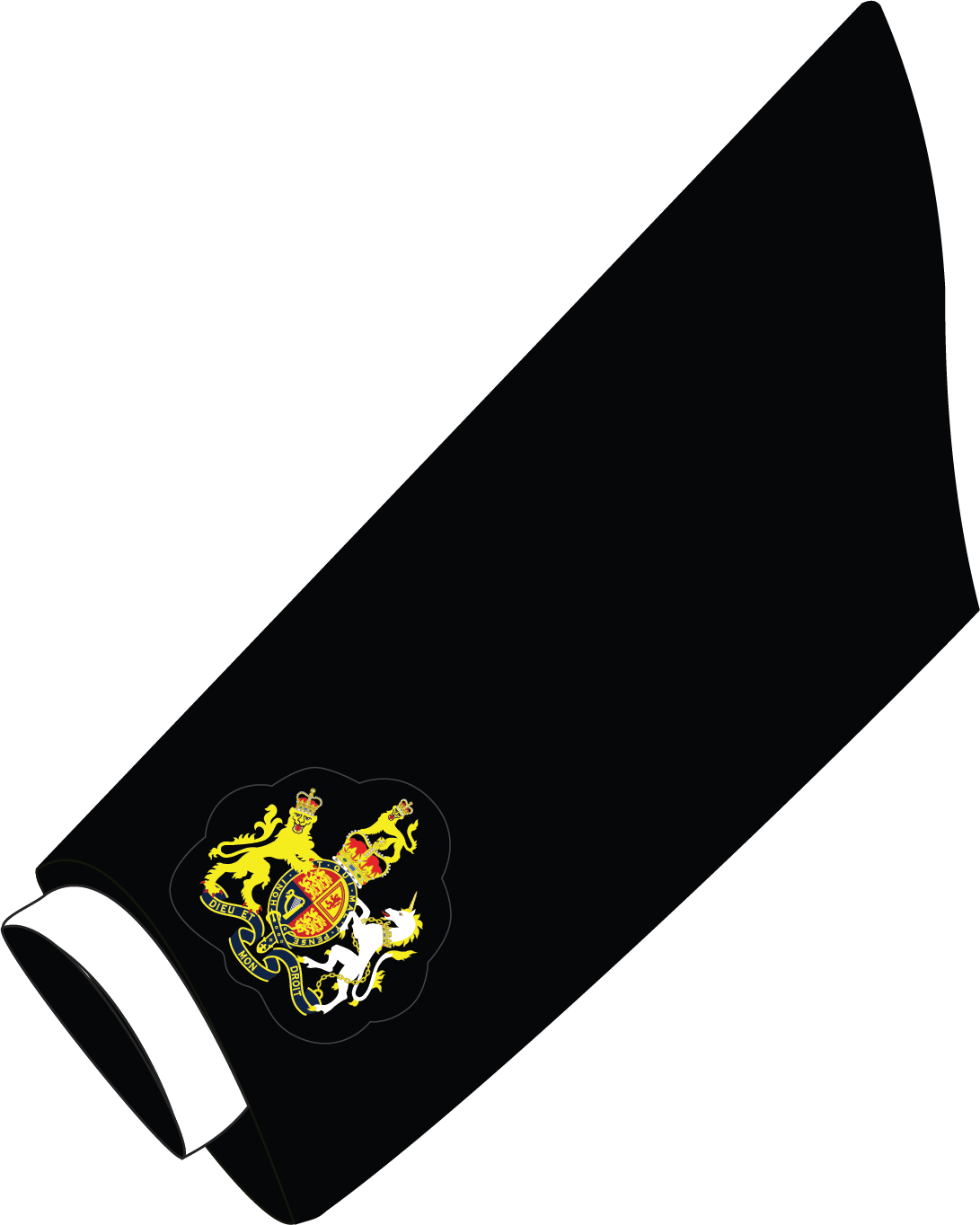
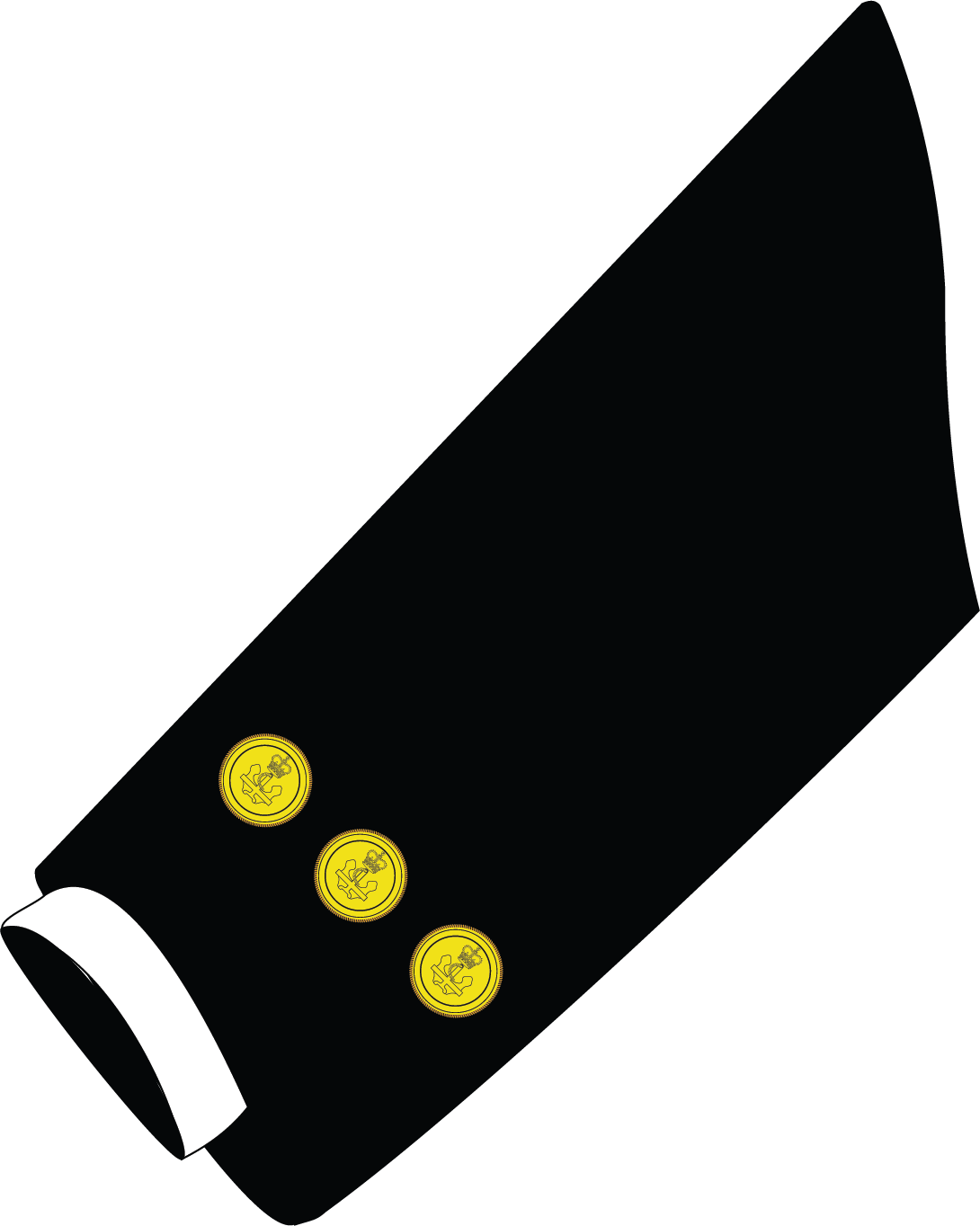
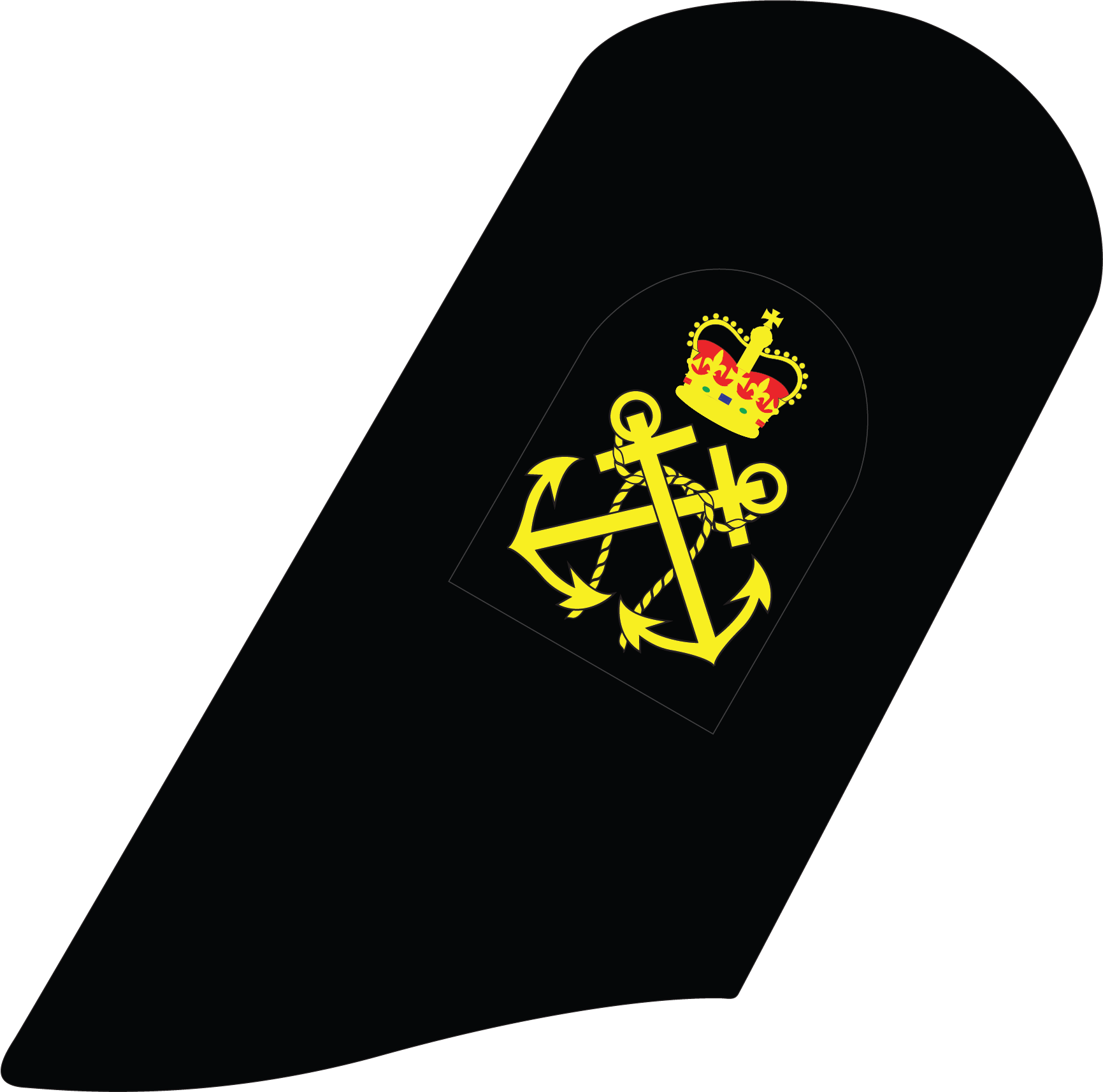
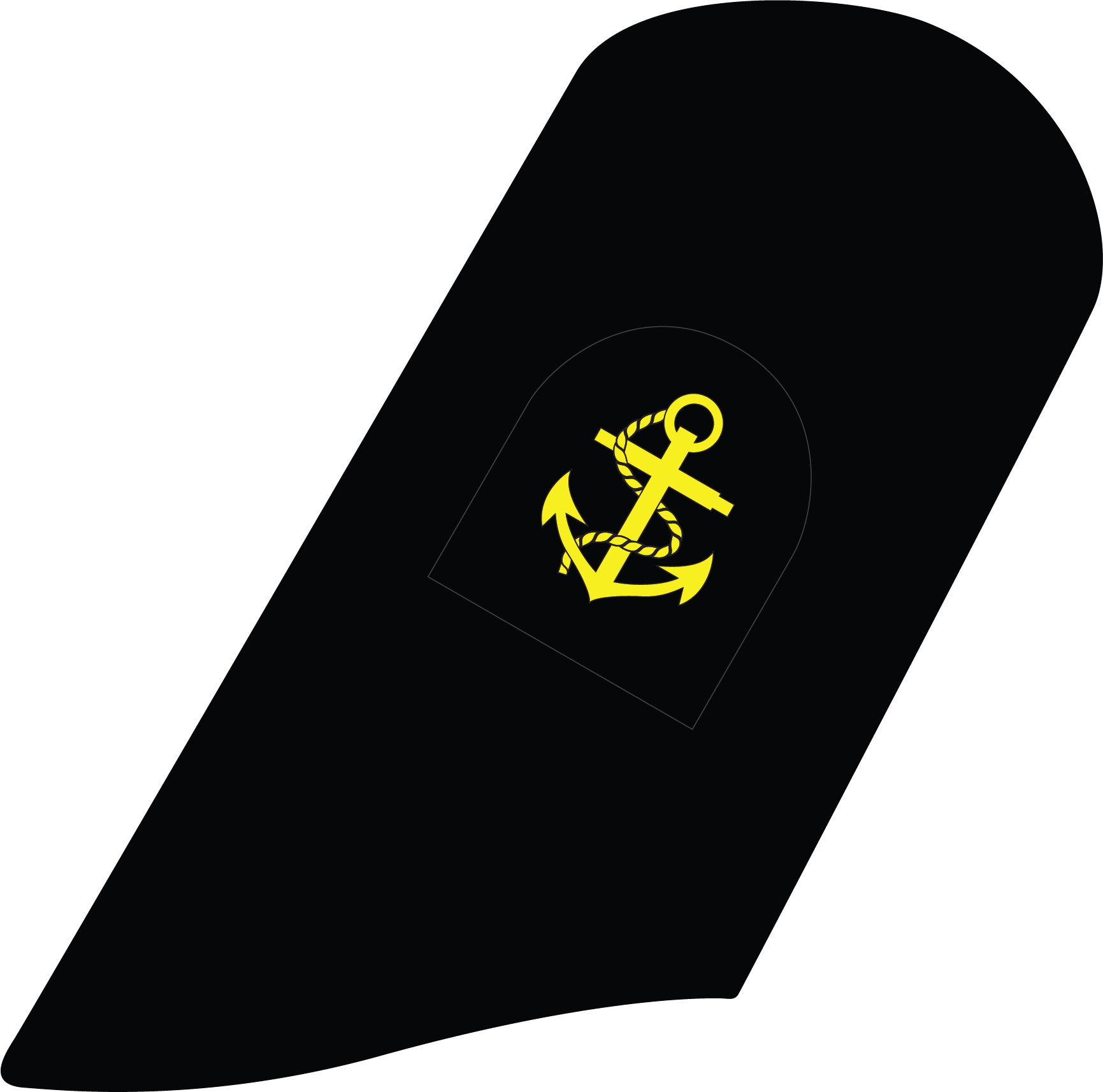
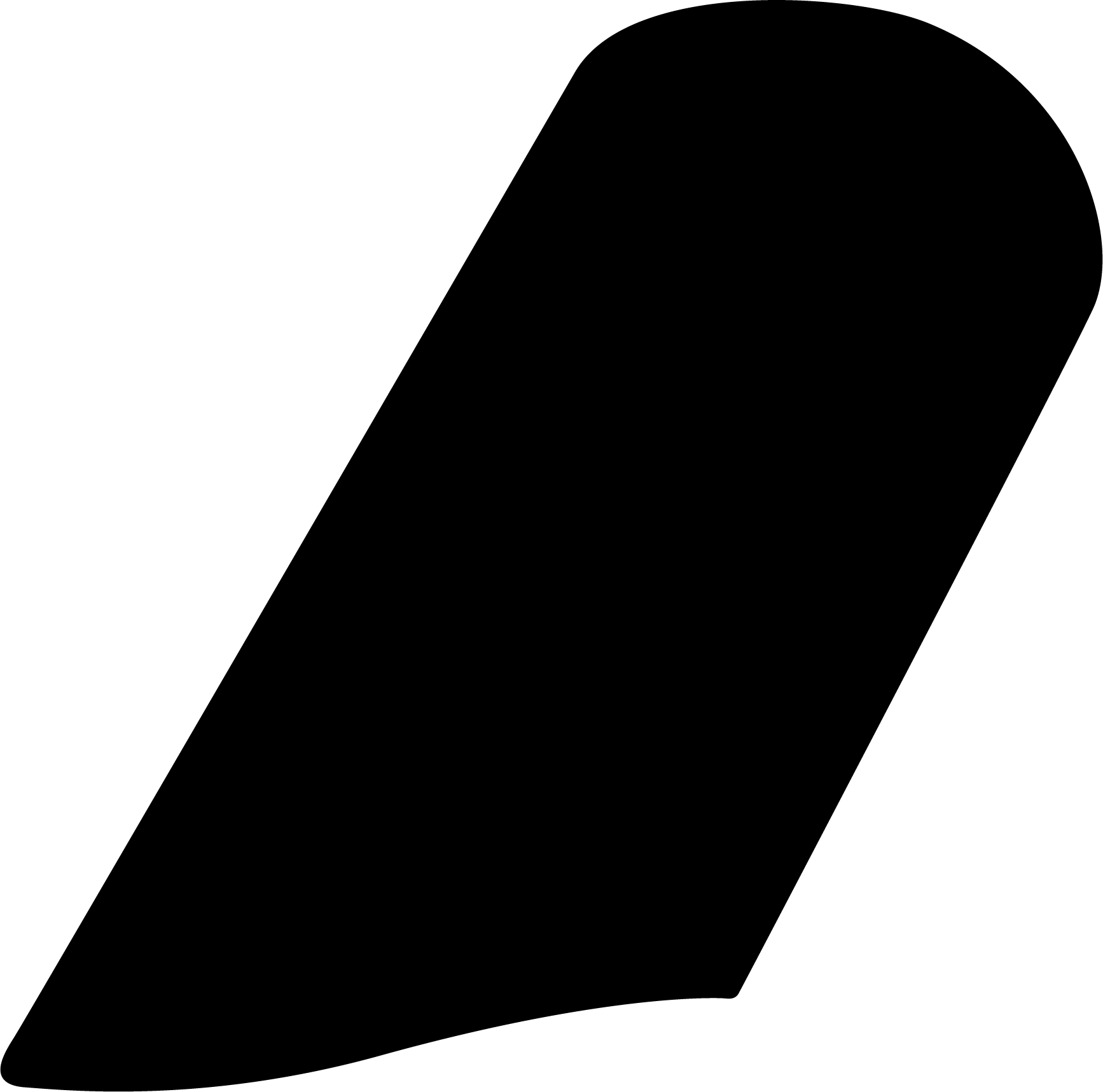
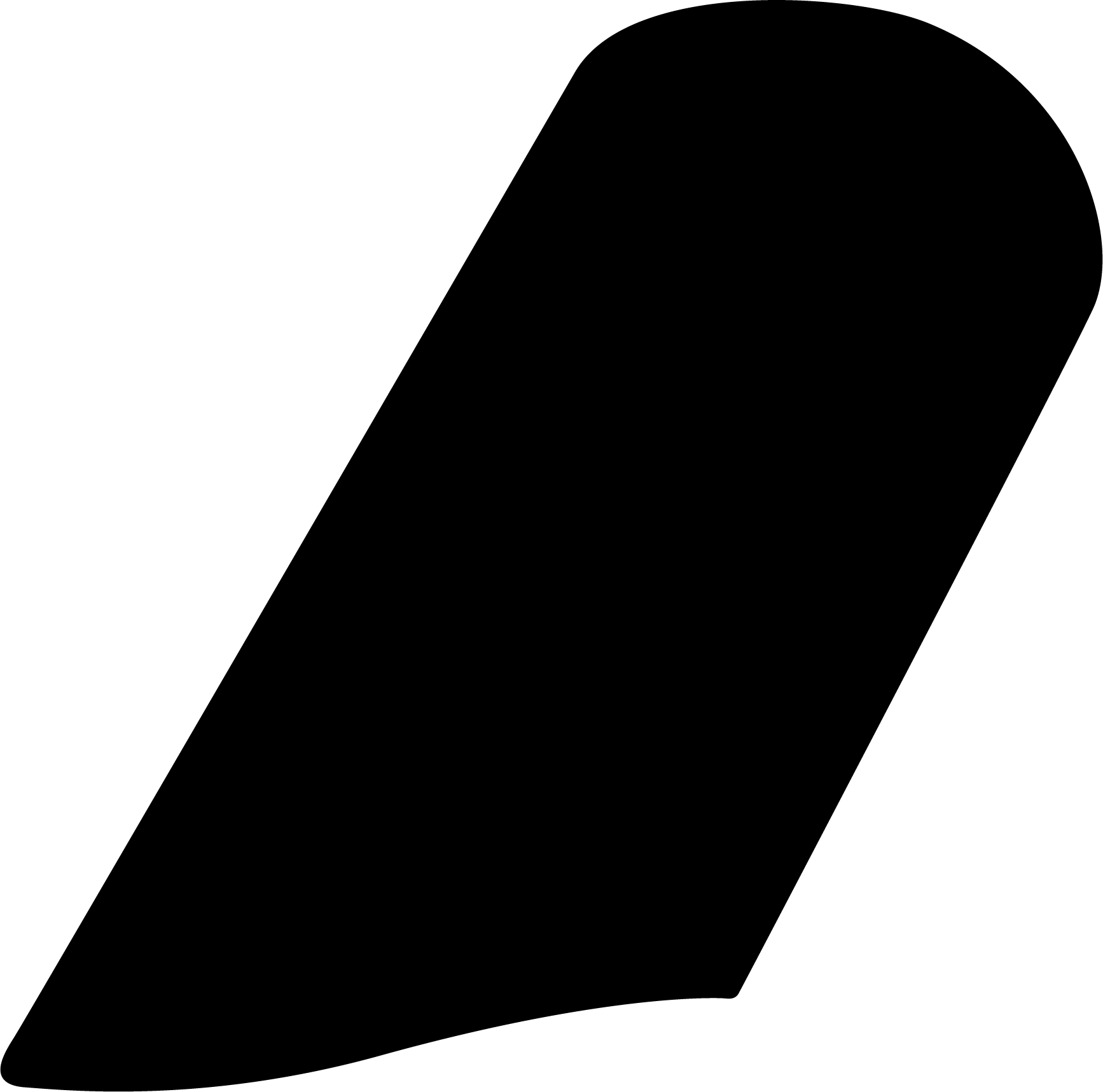
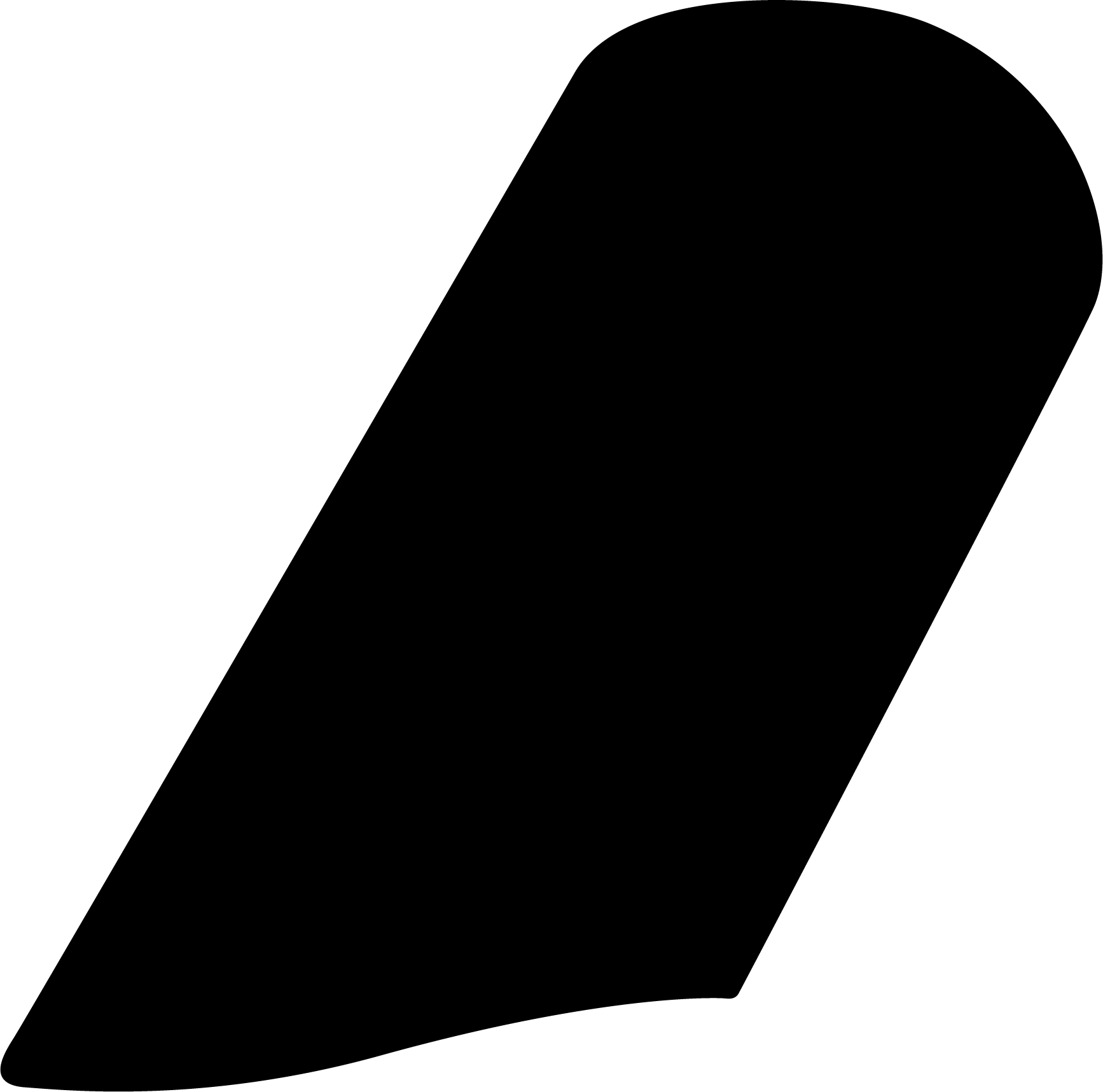
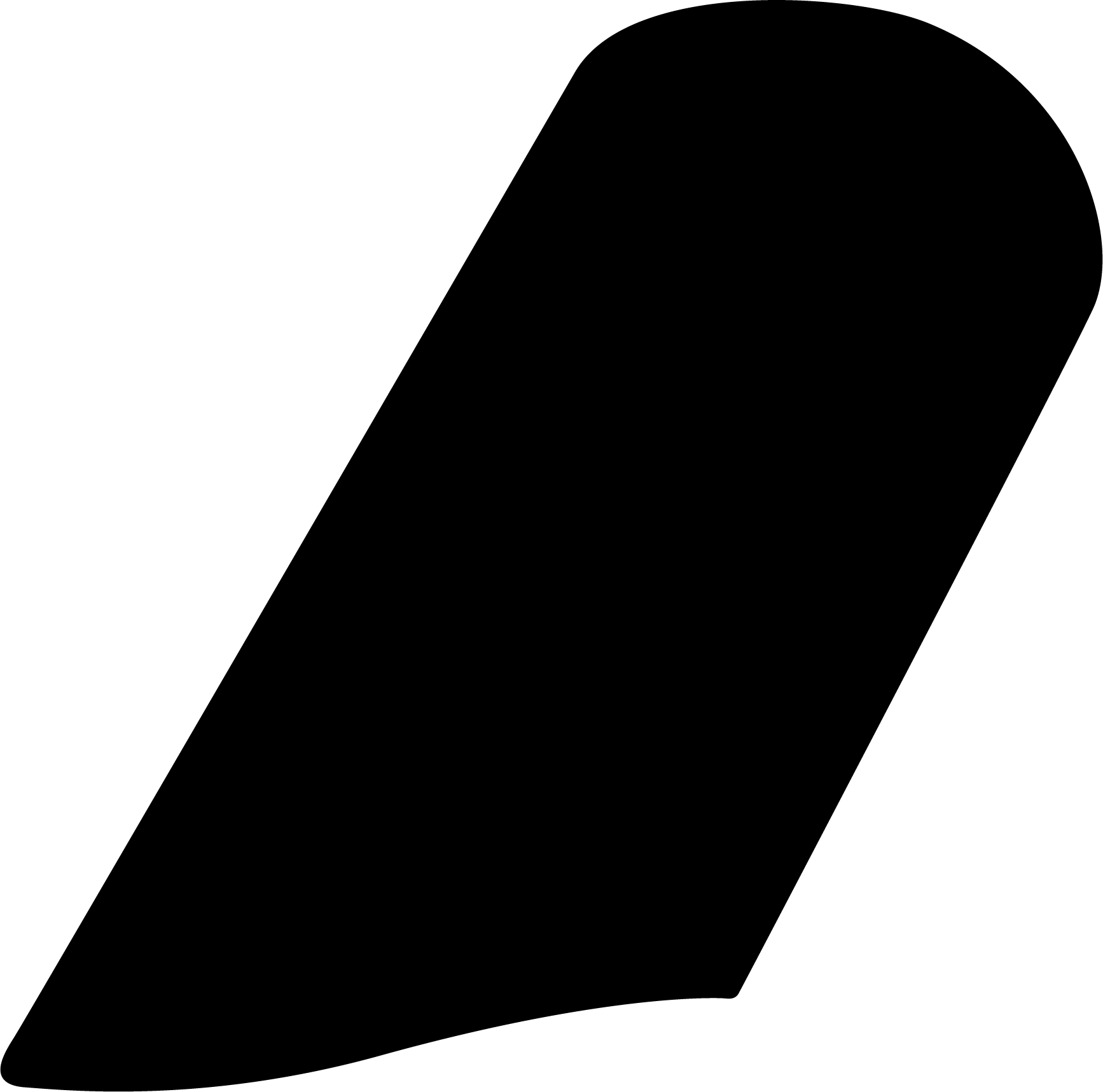
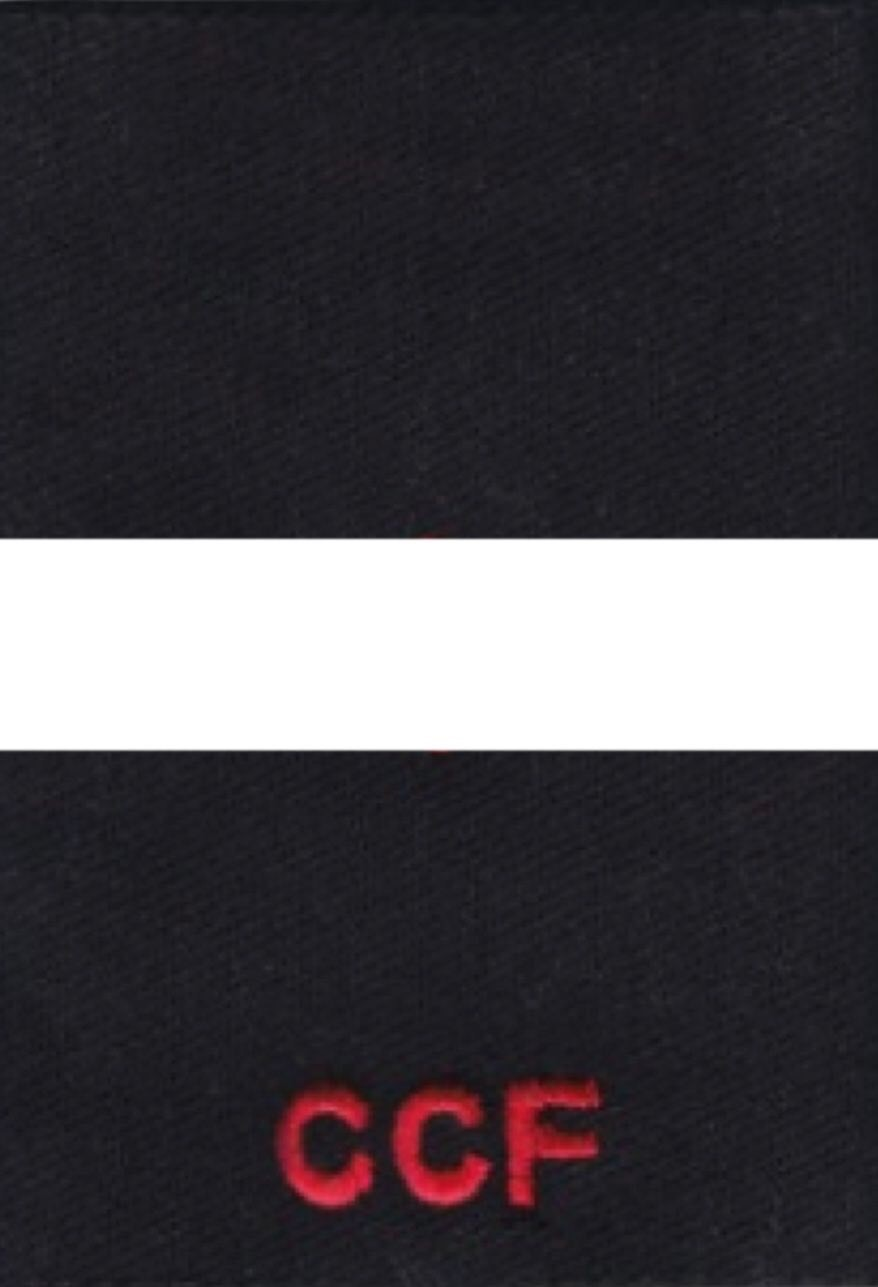
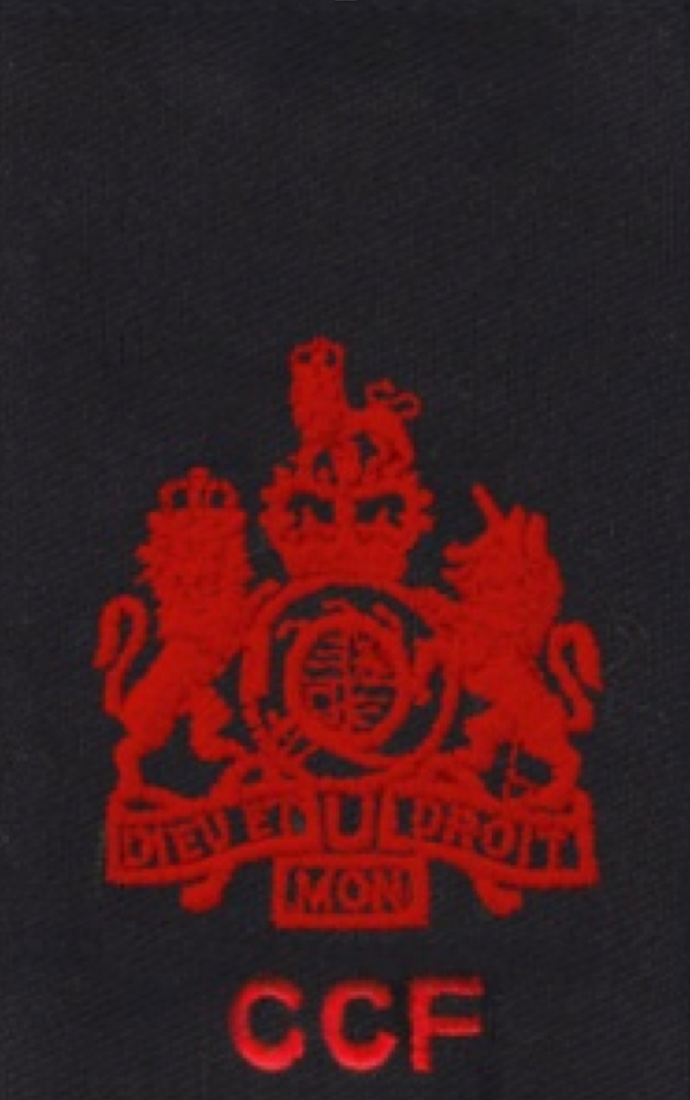
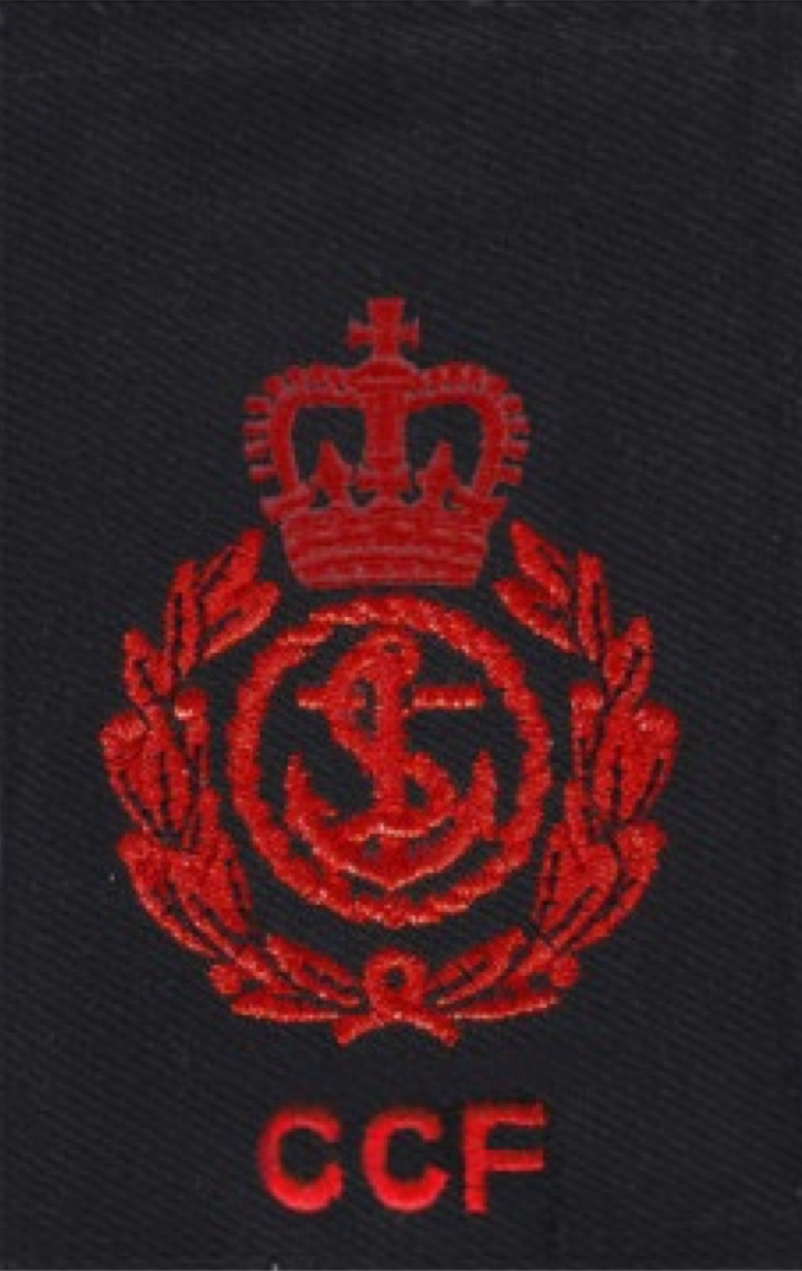
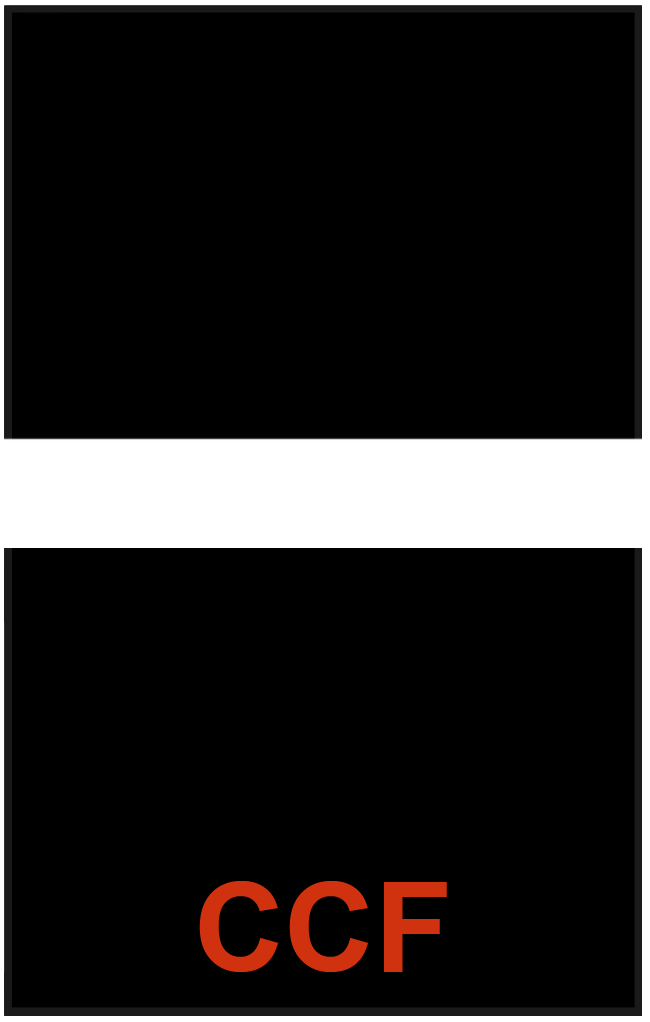
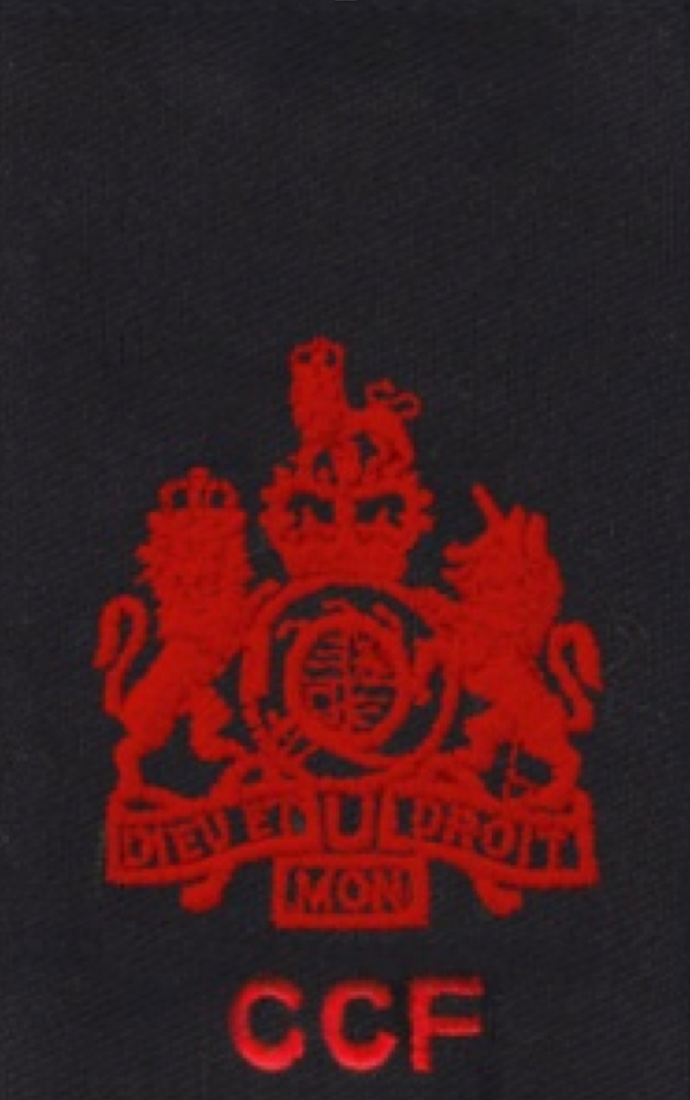
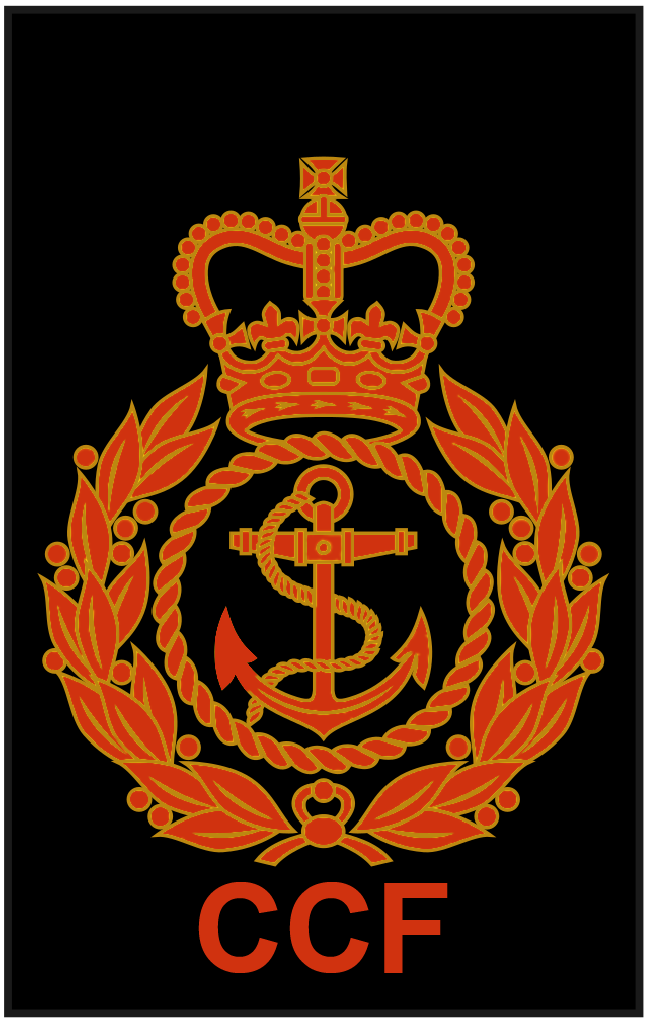
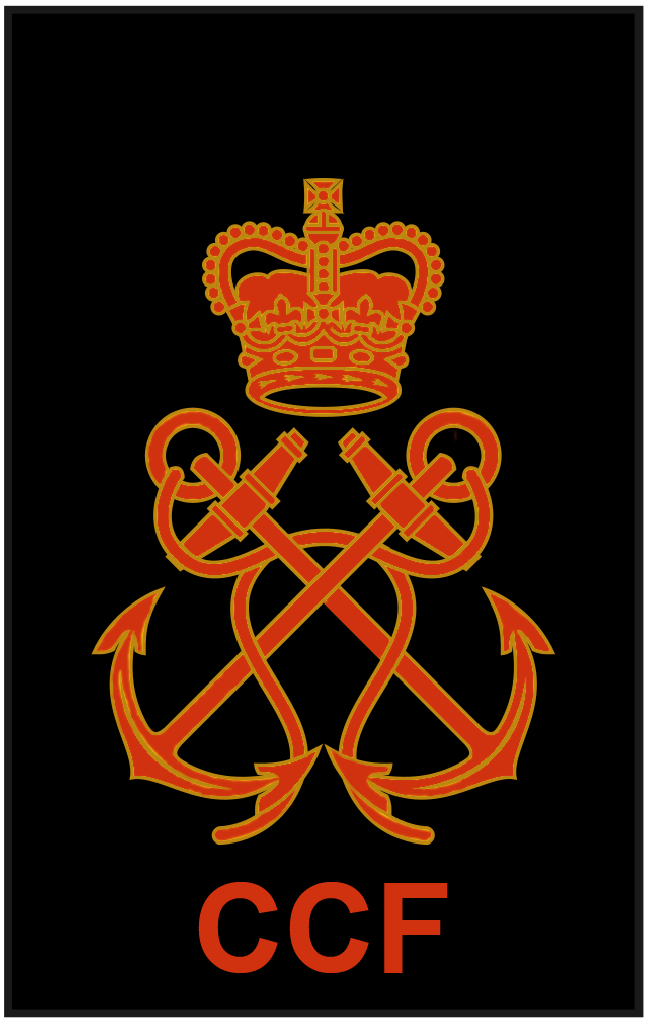
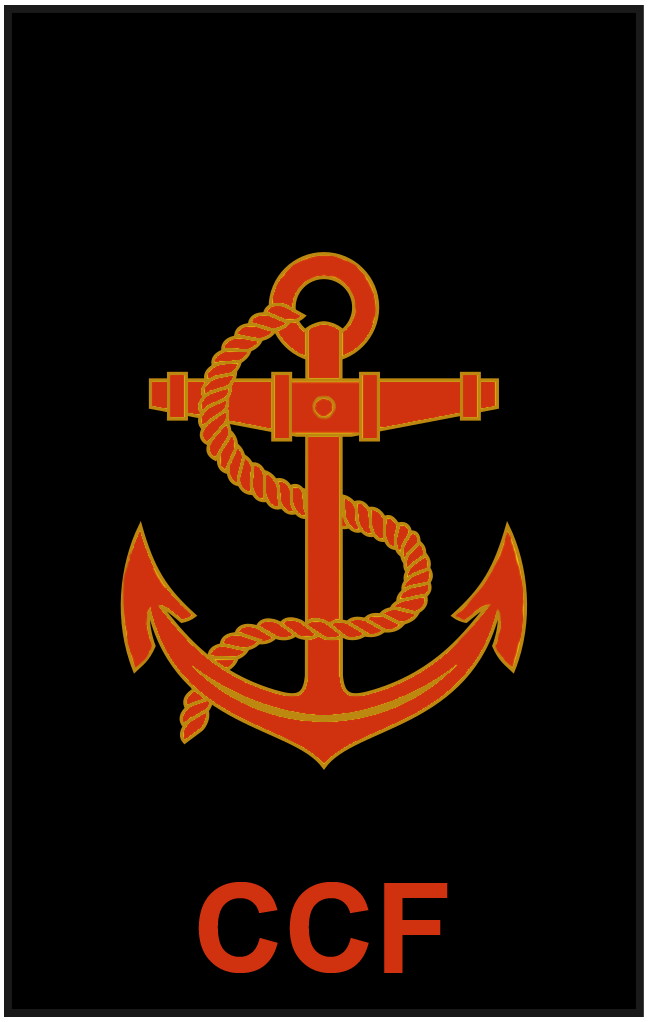
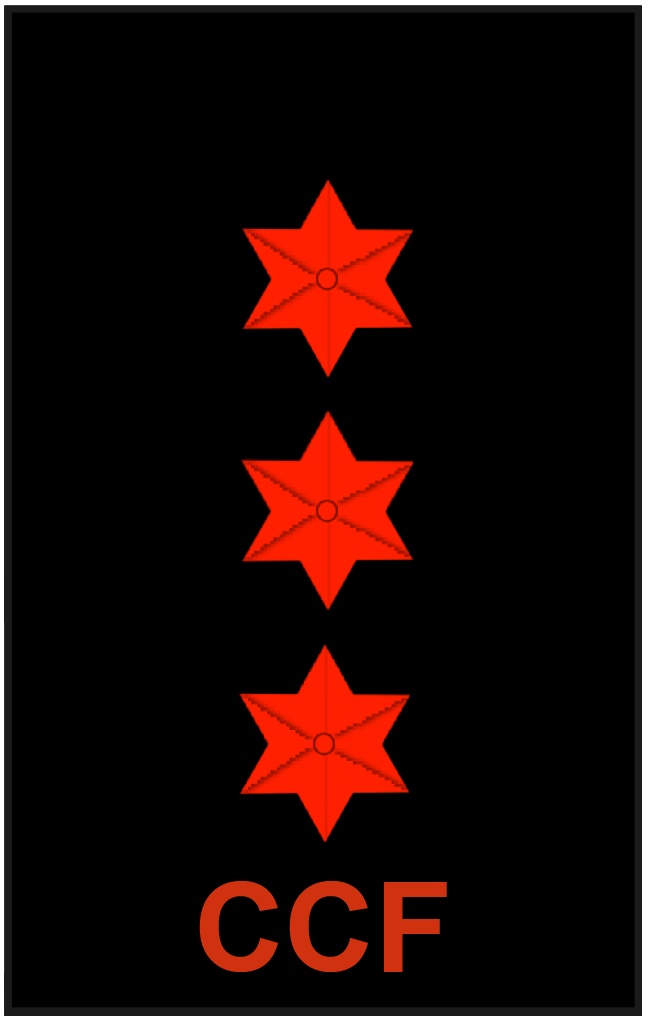
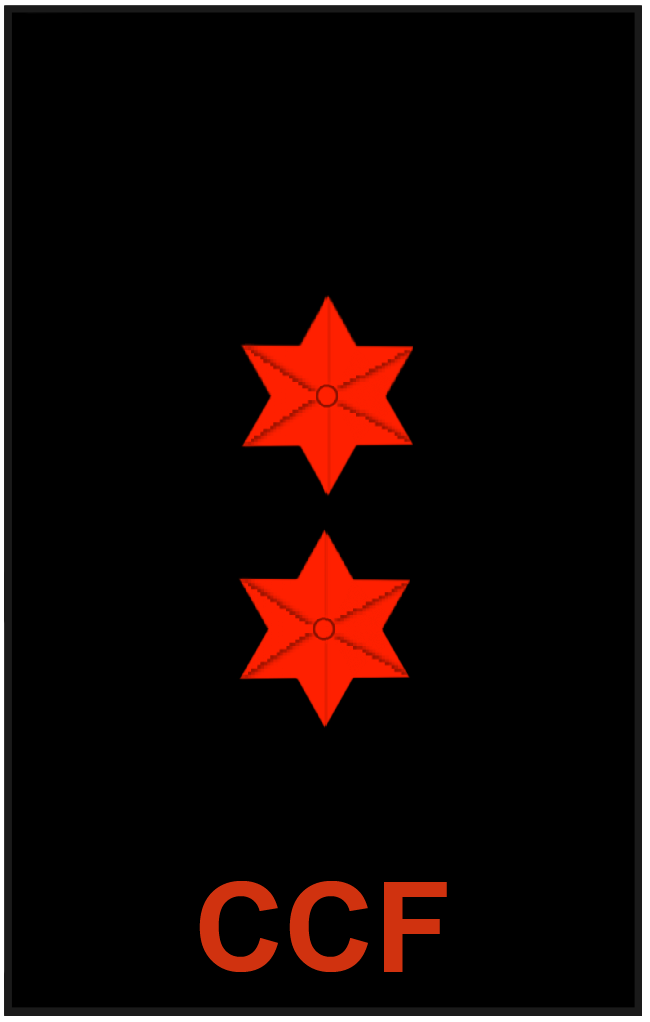
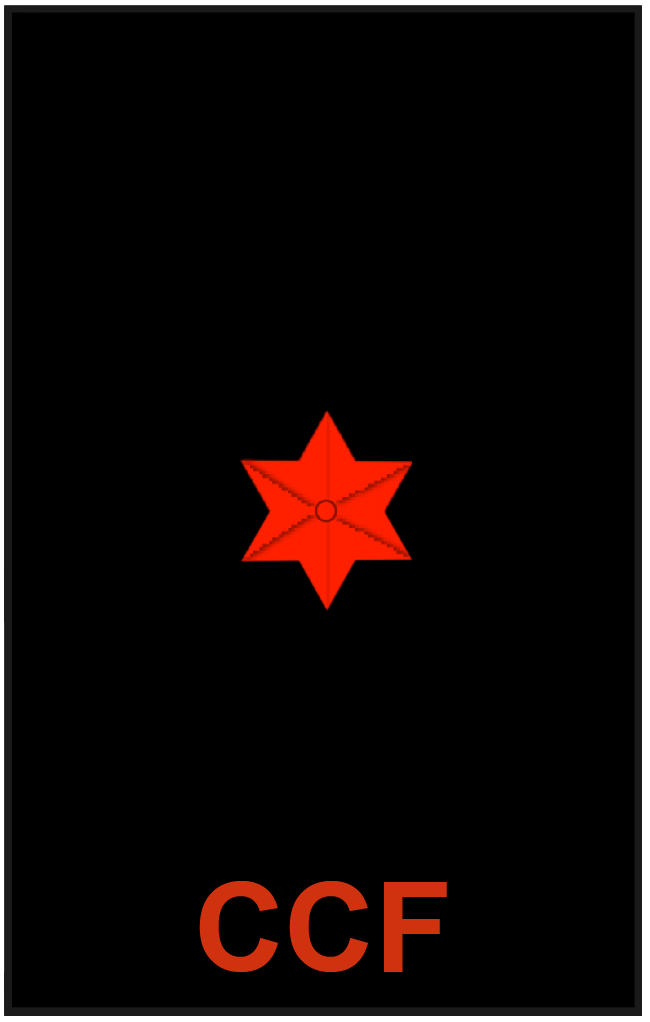
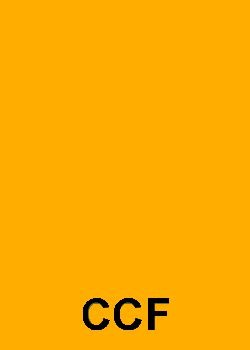
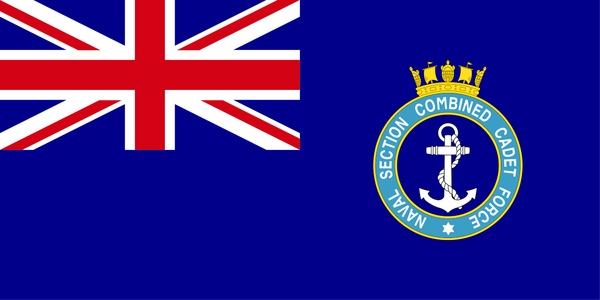
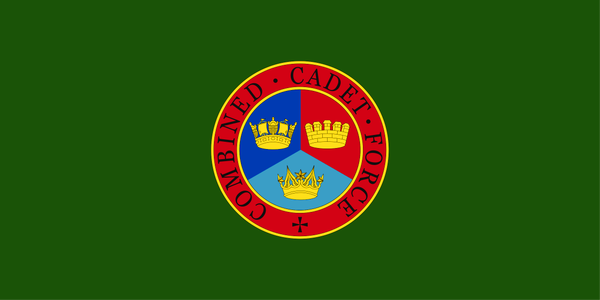
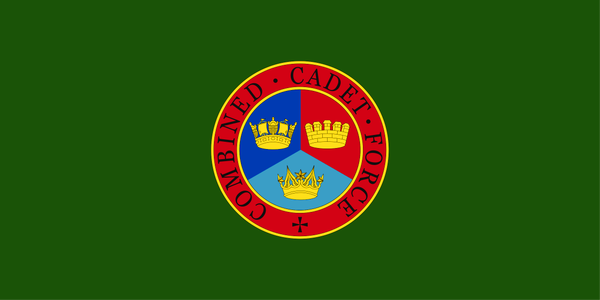
CCF Navy Cadets
Cadet under officer	Warrant officer cadet	Chief petty officer cadet	Petty officer cadet	Leading cadet	Able 3* cadet	Able 2* cadet	Able 1* cadet	Naval cadet	New naval entry
UO	WOCDT	CPOCDT	POCDT	LCDT	A3*CDT	A2*CDT	A1*CDT	NCDT	NNE
CCF Royal Marines Cadets (Part of the CCF RN)	No insignia
Cadet under officer	Cadet warrant officer first class	Cadet warrant officer second class	Cadet colour sergeant	Cadet sergeant	Cadet corporal	Cadet lance corporal	Cadet	Recruit
CDTUO	CDTWO1	CDTWO2	CDTCSGT	CDTSGT	CDTCPL	CDTLCPL	CDT	RCT
CCF Army Cadets	No insignia
Cadet under officer	Cadet regimental sergeant major	Cadet regimental quartermaster sergeant	Cadet company sergeant major	Cadet staff/colour sergeant	Cadet sergeant	Cadet corporal	Cadet lance corporal	Cadet	Recruit
Cdt UO	Cdt RSM	Cdt RQMS	Cdt CSM	Cdt SSgt/Cdt CSgt	Cdt Sgt	Cdt Cpl	Cdt LCpl	Cdt	Rct
CCF RAF Cadets	No insignia
Cadet under officer (former rank, no longer in use)	Cadet warrant officer	Cadet flight sergeant	Cadet sergeant	Cadet corporal	Cadet lance corporal	Cadet
CUO	CWO	Cdt FS	Cdt Sgt	Cdt Cpl	Cdt LCpl	Cdt

Army cadets ranks share associated regiment's equivalent rank title (e.g. Corporal in the Royal Artillery becomes Bombardier.)

== Cadet Force adult volunteers (CFAV) ==
Cadet Force Adult Volunteers (CFAVs), who are the uniformed civilian staff that work in the school contingents, provide training to the cadets. Unlike the other cadet organisations (ATC/SCC/ACF), most adult volunteers are commissioned officers, the exception often being the School Staff Instructor (see below) and the newer position of Sergeant Instructor (SI).

=== CCF Officers ===
CCF officers are not members of the armed forces and are usually teachers or other school staff. As such they are not subject to military law, but are subject to CCF Regulations and are subordinate to officers in the Armed Forces, whether Regular or Reserve. Until 2017 CCF (Army) and CCF (RAF) officers were in special categories of the reserves of their service whereas CCF (RN) Officers were 'appointed' and did not hold commissions. However, on 1 December 2017, the Cadet Forces Commission was introduced and since then this type of commission has been held by all CCF officers.

=== Training ===
- Officers in the Naval section of the CCF, undertake the six day CCF Royal Navy officer induction course training at Britannia Royal Naval College, Dartmouth. It is commanded by a course officer (regular Naval Service) and at least two CFAVs to assist. The training is delivered by regular sailors.
- Similar to officers in the Army Cadet Force, CCF (Army) officers attend the Cadet Forces Commissions Board of the Army Officer Selection Board and must be approved by the Headmaster of the employing school and confirmed by the relevant Army Brigade in order to attend. Prospective officers may be appointed as an "Adult Under Officer", awaiting commissioning.
- CCF (RAF) officers attend the RAFAC Command and Leadership course and undertake the five day RAF Air Cadets Officers and NCO's combined Initial Course at RAF College Cranwell, as Acting Pilot Officer. Upon successful completion of the course, they are awarded their Cadet Forces Commission. Their rank slides are similar to their RAF counterparts, with the addition of the text 'RAF Air Cadets' underneath the displayed rank.

All CCF adult induction/basic/initial courses cover the basic skills needed for CFAVs who wish to serve in the CCF, such as drill and turnout, leadership and teamwork tasks, weapon training, navigation, etc.

=== School Staff Instructors (SSI) ===
Supporting officers in the running of the Contingent is the School Staff Instructor (SSI) – usually a retired Senior Non-commissioned Officer (SNCO) or Warrant Officer. Although they are civilians, they retain their rank as a courtesy and are employed by the school to instruct and assist in the running of the Contingent.

Whilst the majority of the SSIs are (former) SNCOs it is also possible for them to be a Cadet Forces commissioned officer. There is usually only one SSI per Contingent and they are also supported by other external staff, including the RN's Area Instructors, various Brigade Cadet Training Teams (CTTs) and RAF TEST SNCOs.

=== Civilian Instructors (CI) ===
Like the community cadet forces, some Contingents may have one or more Civilian Instructors (CI). These are adult volunteers who may instruct in either a specialist (first aid, signals, etc.) or more generalised role when the establishment level of officers does not include sufficient suitably qualified and experienced personnel to teach these subjects. Many are members of staff at the school.

RN (CCF) RNR	Chief Petty Officer	No equivalent
RN (CCF) RNR	CPO	No equivalent
Army (Cadet Forces)	Staff Sergeant Instructor	Sergeant Instructor
Army (Cadet Forces)	SSI	SI
RAF (RAFAC)	Flight Sergeant RAFAC	Sergeant RAFAC
RAF (RAFAC)	FS RAFAC	Sgt RAFAC

=== Adult Strength ===
The strength of CCF CFAVs is published every year by the Office for National Statistics, usually in April.

As of April 2025, there were:

Section	CFAV
Army	3,120
Royal Air Force	690
RN/RM	650
Total	4,470

=== Officer ranks ===
CCF (RN) ranks are almost the same as for RN (and RNR) officers (with the post-nominals 'RNR' used only in writing, not on insignia) but their rank braid is 'wavy' as used in the past by the RNVR.

CCF (Army) officers are required to wear a "CCF" title on their rank slides, epaulettes, or other part of their uniform as appropriate in addition to any insignia of affiliated Army regiment or corps. Some contingents may also have the school or college name on rank slides.

CCF (RAF) Officers wear 'RAF Air Cadets' on their rank sides, as although they are CCF, they are part of the wider Air Cadets family.

Since the introduction of the Cadet Forces Commission, ranks do not indicate membership of the British Armed Forces.

RN ((CCF) RNR)	Commander (CCF) RNR	Lieutenant Commander (CCF) RNR	Lieutenant (CCF) RNR	Sub Lieutenant (CCF) RNR			
RN ((CCF) RNR)	Cdr (CCF) RNR	Lt Cdr (CCF) RNR	Lt (CCF) RNR	Sub Lt (CFF) RNR			
Army (Cadet Forces)	Lieutenant Colonel	Major	Captain	Lieutenant	Second Lieutenant	Adult Under Officer	
Army (Cadet Forces)	Lt Col (CCF)	Maj (CCF)	Capt (CCF)	Lt (CCF)	2 Lt (CCF)	AUO	
Army (Cadet Forces)						CCF AUO rank slide	
RAF (RAFAC)	Wing Commander	Squadron Leader	Flight Lieutenant	Flying Officer	Pilot Officer	Acting Pilot Officer	Officer Cadet
RAF (RAFAC)	Wg Cdr (RAFAC)	Sqn Ldr (RAFAC)	Flt Lt (RAFAC)	Fg Off (RAFAC)	Plt Off (RAFAC)	A/Plt Off (RAFAC)	O/Cdt (RAFAC)

== Cadet training ==
Each of the CCF sections have different syllabi with a degree of overlap. All the sections learn drill and all cadets are trained to fire the L98A2 5.56 mm Cadet General Purpose rifle, a semi-automatic only version of the L85A2 used by the UK armed forces. There are also opportunities to fire the L144 A1 Cadet Small Bore Target Rifle (CSBTR) and the L81 Cadet Target Rifle.

The MoD allocates over five and half million rounds of 5.56mm ammunition to Cadet Training each year.

=== Royal Navy section ===
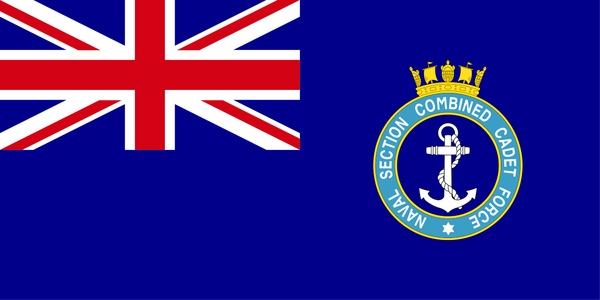
Ensign of the Naval section of the CCF.

Cadets in the Royal Navy section receive instruction in boat-work and other naval subjects (including flying with the Fleet Air Arm). The Royal Navy also offers many CCF courses during the school holidays which are open to any members of any CCF.

CCF RN Ships
Name	Type	Class	Length (ft)
MV Blue Swan	Motor Boat	Talisman	49
MV Black Swan	Motor Boat	Talisman	49
SV Cornish Air	Sloop	Rustler	36
STC Amaryllis	Sloop		
TS Dragon	Sloop		
TS Phoenix	Sloop		

==== Royal Marine Section ====
The Royal Marines section, although a part of the Navy, tend to train independently, covering battle drills, weapons handling and marksmanship, fieldcraft, camouflage and concealment and the history of the Royal Marines.

=== Army section ===
The Army section follows the Army Proficiency Certificate (APC) subjects such as drill and turnout, skill at arms, shooting, map and compass, fieldcraft and first aid.

=== Royal Air Force section ===
As CCF (RAF) sections form part of the larger Royal Air Force Air Cadets, they are eligible to undertake the same syllabus and training opportunities as the Air Training Corps:

RAF section cadets are given the opportunity to fly in both powered aircraft, most notably the Grob Tutor and in unpowered gliders such as the Grob Viking; their training and flying courses are identical to those available to members of the Air Training Corps. Cadets can also be involved in a multitude of battle training and tactics as well as opportunities to fly in various aircraft from the RAF and allied nations. The section also learn about aerospace management, aircraft structure and propulsion, engineering, air power doctrine as well as an opportunity to see how most RAF stations, sections and wings or squadrons operate. As well as practical learning, RAF cadets also follow an academic syllabus. Cadets are usually taught "Part 1" before being expected to complete Parts 2 – 4 by themselves through the medium of Bader Learn. Completing Part 4, also known as the Master Cadet Award, leads to a BTEC Level 2 in Aerospace Studies (accredited by Pearson) being awarded, although CCF cadets, unlike those in the ATC, have to pay to receive this BTEC.

Cadets may also take part in regional and national competitions, such as the Air Squadron Trophy Competition.

=== Further training ===
All sections can undertake leadership courses as well as adventurous training. There are also other courses available for cadets to enhance their skills, such as Junior and Senior Cadet Instructor Courses (JCIC, SCIC) and Method of Instruction (MOI).

== See also ==
Elements of the Community Cadet Forces

- Sea Cadet Corps
- Army Cadet Force
- Air Training Corps

Other MoD sponsored or recognized cadet forces

- Volunteer Cadet Corps

Related articles

- Cadets (youth program)
- Cadet Vocational Qualification Organisation (CVQO)
- National Association of Training Corps for Girls
- Reserve Forces and Cadets Association
- Bermuda Cadet Corps
- Junior Reserve Officers' Training Corps
