= Bowman 45 =

Ocean-cruising yacht

Development
- Designer: C.W. Paine Yacht Design
- Name: Bowman 45

Boat
- Draft: 5' 11"

Hull
- Type: Monohull yacht
- Hull weight: 27,569 lb
- LOA: 47' 7"
- LWL: 36' 6"
- Beam: 13' 0"

Hull appendages
- Keel: Fin keel

Rig
- Rig type: Bermudan cutter

Sails
- Total sail area: 1096 ft^{2}

The Bowman 45 is an ocean-cruising yacht produced by Rustler Yachts of Falmouth. The yacht is traditionally lined and styled, but is built from solid glassfibre composite with a fin and skeg underwater profile.

To achieve a good seakeeping ability for ocean cruising, the yacht is heavily constructed, and well ballasted. In addition, the yacht incorporates a strong skeg hung rudder. The production of the yachts on a semi-custom basis, and the small numbers of yachts produced each year, result in a significantly higher purchase cost than comparable yachts from mass-production companies. The yacht is available in various degrees of part-completion as well as in factory-finished form.

== See also ==
- Bowman Yachts
- Bowman 42
- Bowman 48
- Rustler 42
- Rustler 44
