= Reginald Gray =

Reginald Gray may refer to:

- Reginald Gray (MP), Member of Parliament for Weymouth 1562/3–1570
- Sir Reginald Gray (barrister) (1851–1935), Bermudian politician and barrister
- Reginald Gray (artist) (1930–2013), Irish portrait painter
- Reggie Gray (born 1984), American football player

== See also ==
- Reginald Grey (disambiguation)
