= Appleby (law firm) =

Bermudian Offshore legal services provider

- Founded: 1898
- Founder: Reginald Appleby
- Headquarters: Hamilton, Bermuda
- Area served: Bermuda, British Virgin Islands, Cayman Islands, Hong Kong, Isle of Man, Jersey, Guernsey, Mauritius, Seychelles, Shanghai
- Website: applebyglobal.com

Appleby (previously Appleby Spurling & Kempe, Appleby Spurling Hunter and Appleby Hunter Bailhache) is a Bermudian offshore legal services provider.

It has offices in offshore locations including Bermuda, the British Virgin Islands, the Cayman Islands, Isle of Man, Jersey, Guernsey, Mauritius and Seychelles as well as the financial centres of Hong Kong and Shanghai. It is referred to in the Paradise Papers, and included in the group of law firms known as the offshore magic circle.

== History ==
The original firm of Appleby was founded by Reginald Appleby (1865–1948) in Bermuda in 1898. Appleby had passed his final law exams in England in 1887 and had been in partnership with Reginald Gray (later Sir) attorney-general of Bermuda, from 1893 to 1897 in Bermuda as Gray & Appleby.

In 1938 Appleby and Dudley Spurling (later Sir) merged their practices to establish Appleby & Spurling. In 1949, that firm merged with William Kempe to become Appleby Spurling Kemp (or Kempe). Dudley Spurling was the senior partner of the merged firm until 1981. In 2004 they merged with Cayman Islands' law firm Hunter & Hunter and with Jersey based firm, Bailhache Labesse in September 2006.

Appleby announced on 15 June 2008 that it was to merge with Isle of Man based Dickinson Cruickshank & Co., enabling it to become the largest offshore law firm in the world with 73 partners and 200 lawyers. In 2010, they opened an office in Guernsey. In 2012, they announced that they would be opening an office in Shanghai. In 2014, Appleby worked with the company Apple Inc. in a function similar to a general contractor to provide offshore offices on the island of Jersey in co-operation with the law firm Baker McKenzie.

Until 2016, Appleby operated in partnership with the corporate services provider Estera until Estera split to become independent.

== Paradise Papers ==
On 24 October 2017, the firm confirmed that it was subject to a "data security incident" the previous year. Appleby is identified as the source of a 2017 theft of documents known as the Paradise Papers. In December 2017, the firm announced that it intended to sue the BBC and The Guardian newspaper over its reporting of the case. The Paradise Papers revealed that Appleby provided active client services to Mukhtar Ablyazov, who at the time was charged in multiple jurisdictions for fraud and embezzlement of up to $10 billion from the bank he chaired.

== Rankings and recognition ==
Appleby was ranked in Band 1 global-wide offshore in a 2015 client's guide to the legal profession. They have won multiple awards for its practice of offshore law.

== See also ==
- Conyers Dill & Pearman
