= General Grey =

General Grey may refer to:

- Charles Grey (British Army officer) (1804–1870), British Army general
- Charles Grey, 1st Earl Grey (1729–1807), British Army lieutenant general
- Henry George Grey (1766–1845), British Army lieutenant general
- John Grey (Australian general) (born 1939), Australian Army lieutenant general
- John Grey (British Army officer, died 1760), British Army major general
- John Grey (British Army officer, died 1856) (c. 1782–1856), British Army lieutenant general
- Ron Grey (born 1930), Australian Army major general

== See also ==
- General Gray (disambiguation)
