= General Gray =

General Gray may refer to:

- Alfred M. Gray Jr. (1928-2024), U.S. Marine Corps general and 29th Commandant of the Marine Corps
- Carl R. Gray Jr. (1889–1955), U.S. Army major general
- Sir George Gray, 3rd Baronet (c. 1710–1773), British Army lieutenant general
- Henry Gray (politician) (1816–1892), Confederate States Army brigadier general
- Michael Gray (British Army officer) (1932–2011), British Army lieutenant general
- Sue Gray (RAF officer) (born 1963), Royal Air Force air marshal

== See also ==
- General Grey (disambiguation)
- Attorney General Gray (disambiguation)
