= Bowman Yachts =

- Current owner: Rustler Yachts
- Country: Falmouth, Cornwall, UK
- Introduced: Became brand of Rustler Yachts in 2002
- Markets: Yacht building
- Previous owners: Bowman Yachts, Rival Bowman

Bowman Yachts is a brand of the British premium yachtbuilder Rustler Yachts, which is based in Falmouth, Cornwall. They are known for handbuilding traditionally styled glassfibre composite ocean-cruising yachts, with a high quality of workmanship.

Bowman existed as an independent company for many years, before merging with Rival Yachts to form Rival Bowman in 1998. Rival Bowman went into receivership three years later, in November 2001, and was acquired by Rustler Yachts in 2002, which moved manufacturing to its yard in Falmouth. Rustler's own yachts, and those marketed under the Bowman brand, are produced in the same factory, built in 2005, as were the yachts of the Starlight brand, owned by Rival Bowman until 2011. Bowman hulls are available part-complete for fitting out by the owner, in addition to factory-completed boats.

== Range ==
- Bowman 42
- Bowman 45
- Bowman 47
- Bowman 48
- Bowman 57
- Bowman 66
- Bowman 77
- Bowman 84

== See also ==
- List of sailboat designers and manufacturers
