= Bermuda Cadet Corps =

Disbanded cadet force in Bermuda

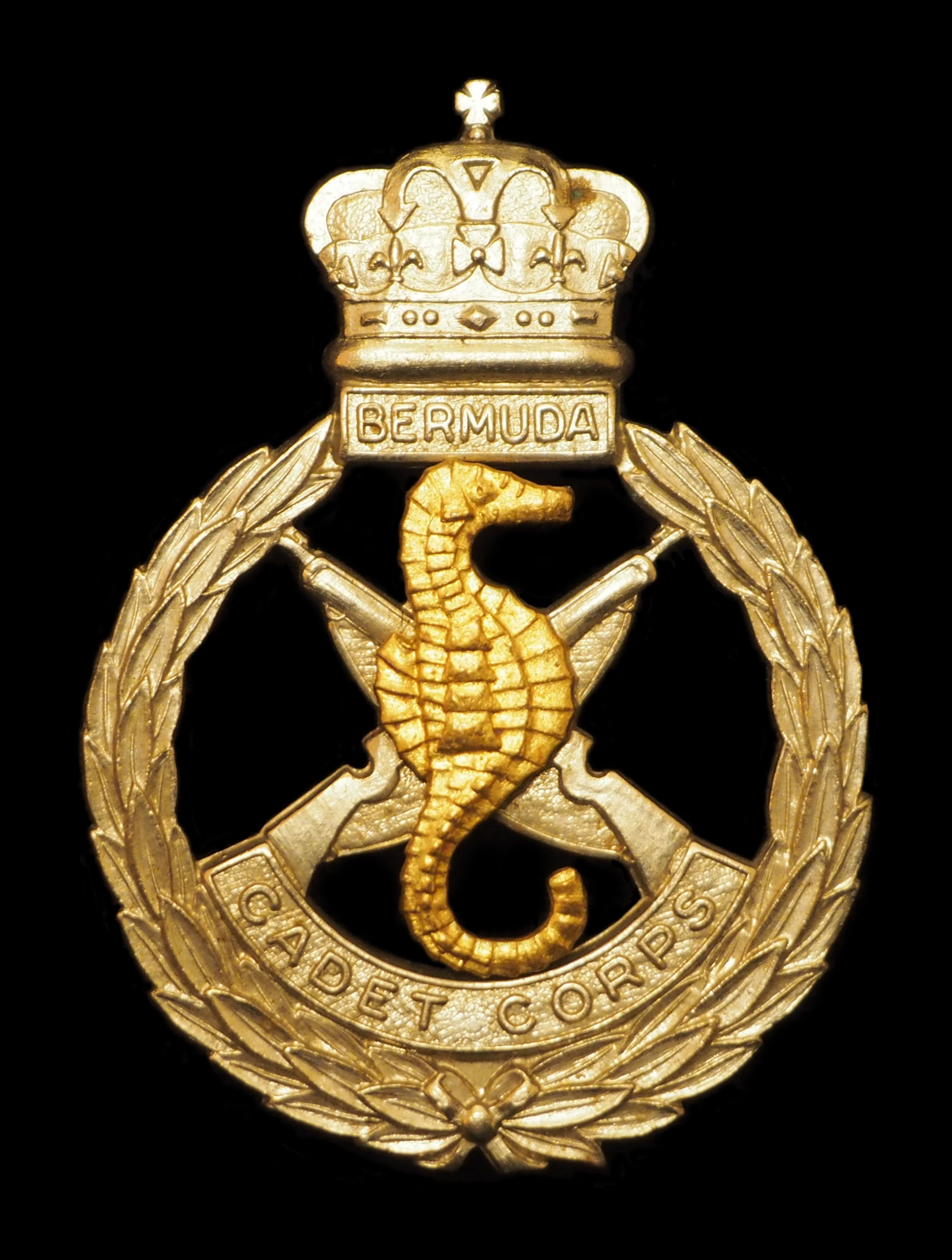
- Cap badge of the Bermuda Cadet Corps
- Active: 1901–2012
- Country: Bermuda (United Kingdom)
- Role: Volunteer Youth Organisation British Army
- Garrison/HQ: Bermuda Garrison

Commanders
- Ceremonial chief: Queen Elizabeth II

The Bermuda Cadet Corps was a youth organisation in the Imperial fortress colony of Bermuda, sponsored originally by the War Office and the British Army. Modelled on the Cadet Corps in England, now organised as the Army Cadet Force and the Combined Cadet Force, it was organised separately under Acts of the Parliament of Bermuda. It was one of three Cadet Corps that historically operated in the British territory, with the others being the Bermuda Sea Cadet Corps (with the Girls Nautical Training Corps) and the Air Training Corps, of which only the Bermuda Sea Cadet Corps remains. After more than a century of existence, the Bermuda Cadet Corps was disbanded in 2013 and replaced by the resurrected Junior Leaders programme of the Royal Bermuda Regiment.

== History ==
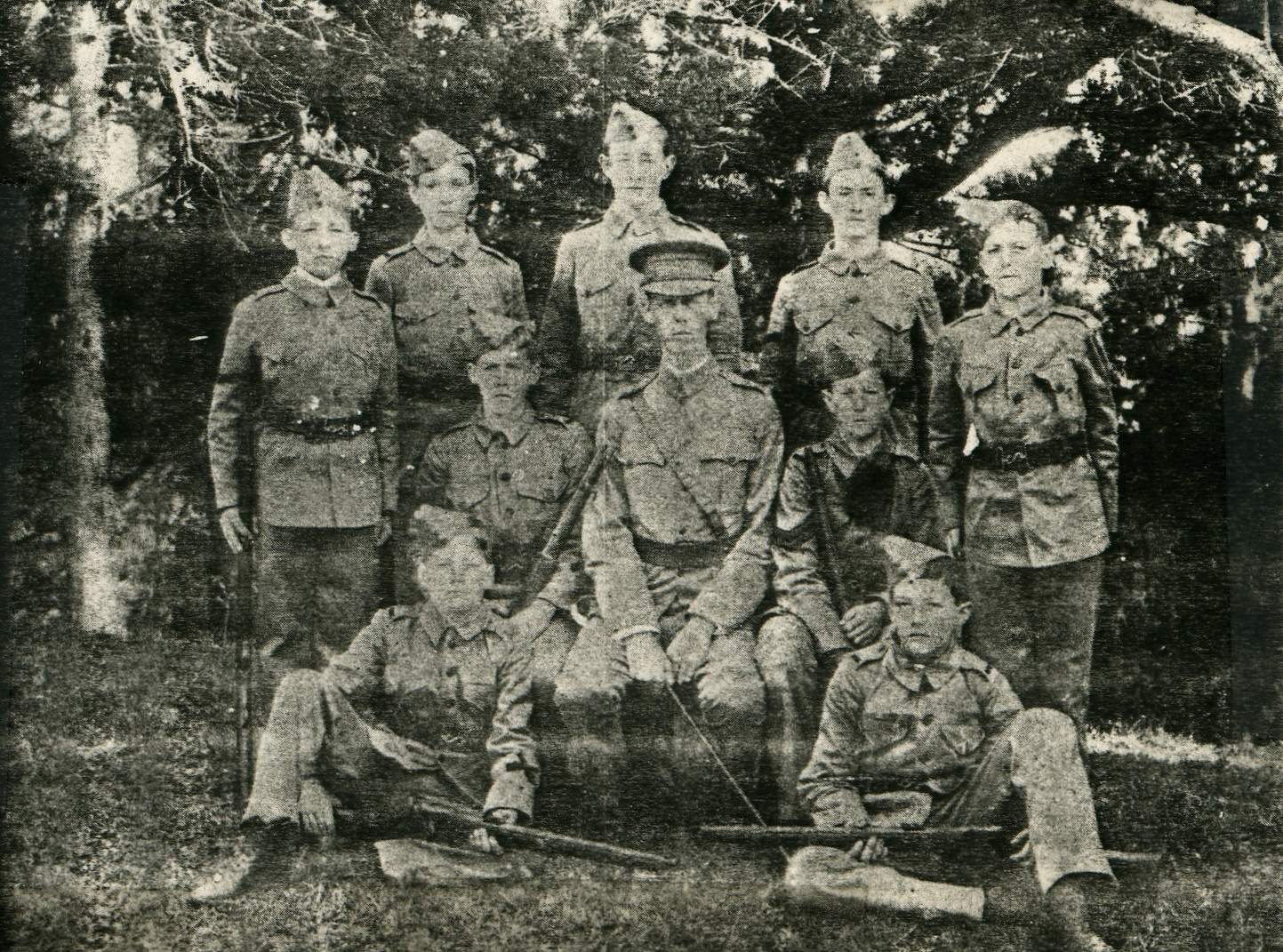
Cadet Corps (Saltus Grammar School), ca. 1901

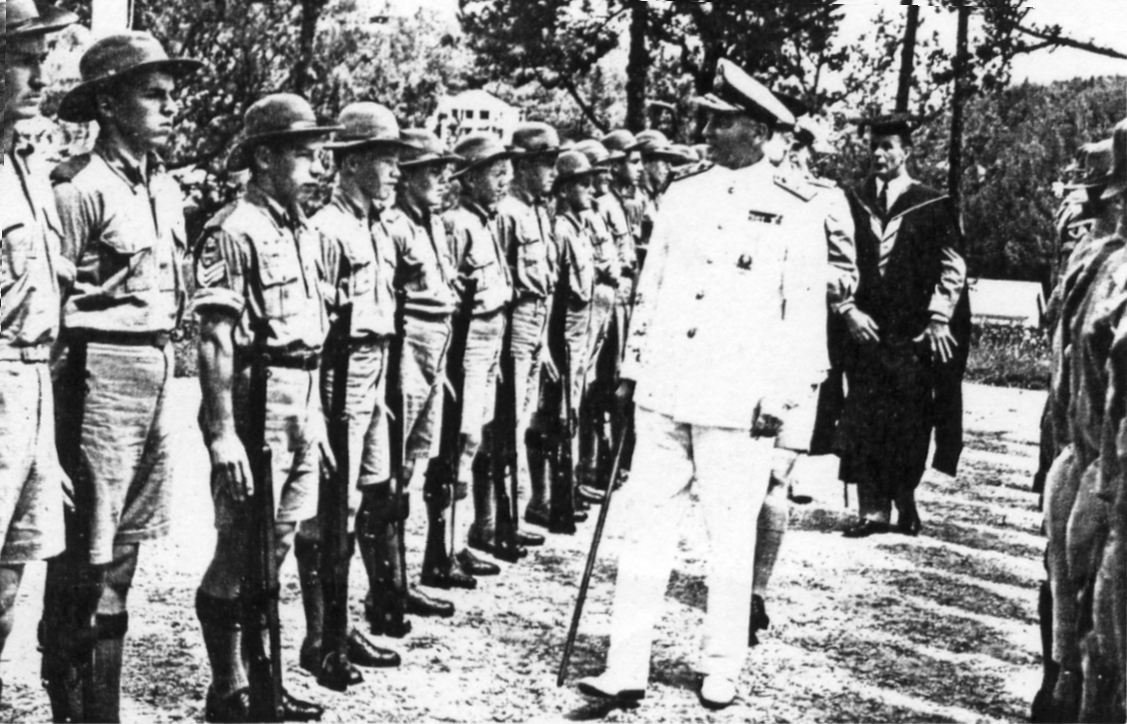
Bermuda Cadet Corps in the Second World War

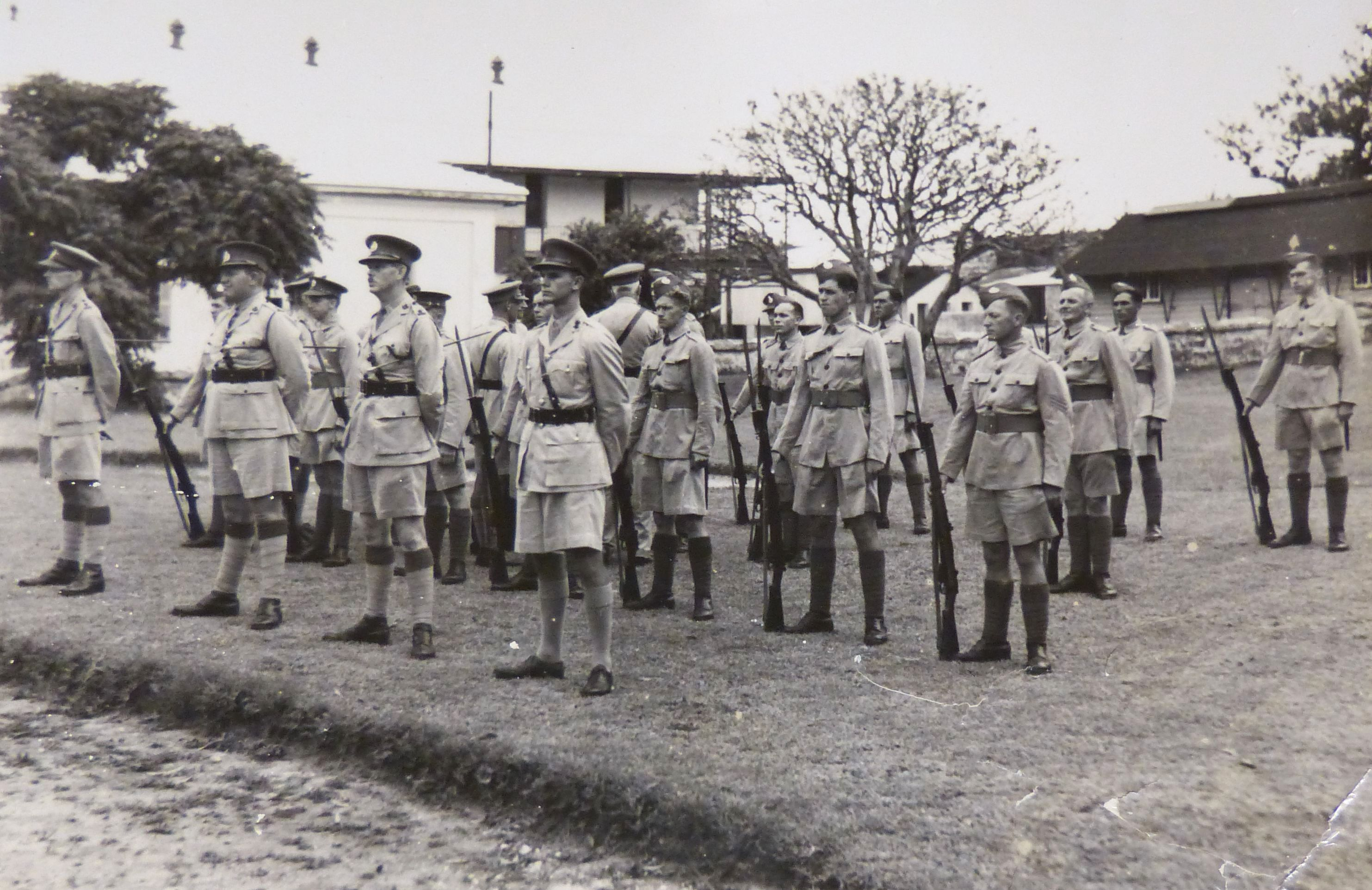
22 June 1940 Prospect Camp inspection by Lieutenant-General Sir Denis Bernard of 1st Bermuda Volunteer Rifle Corps Contingent to the Lincolnshire Regiment, including pre-war BCC officer Second-Lieutenant (Acting Major) Bernard John Abbott

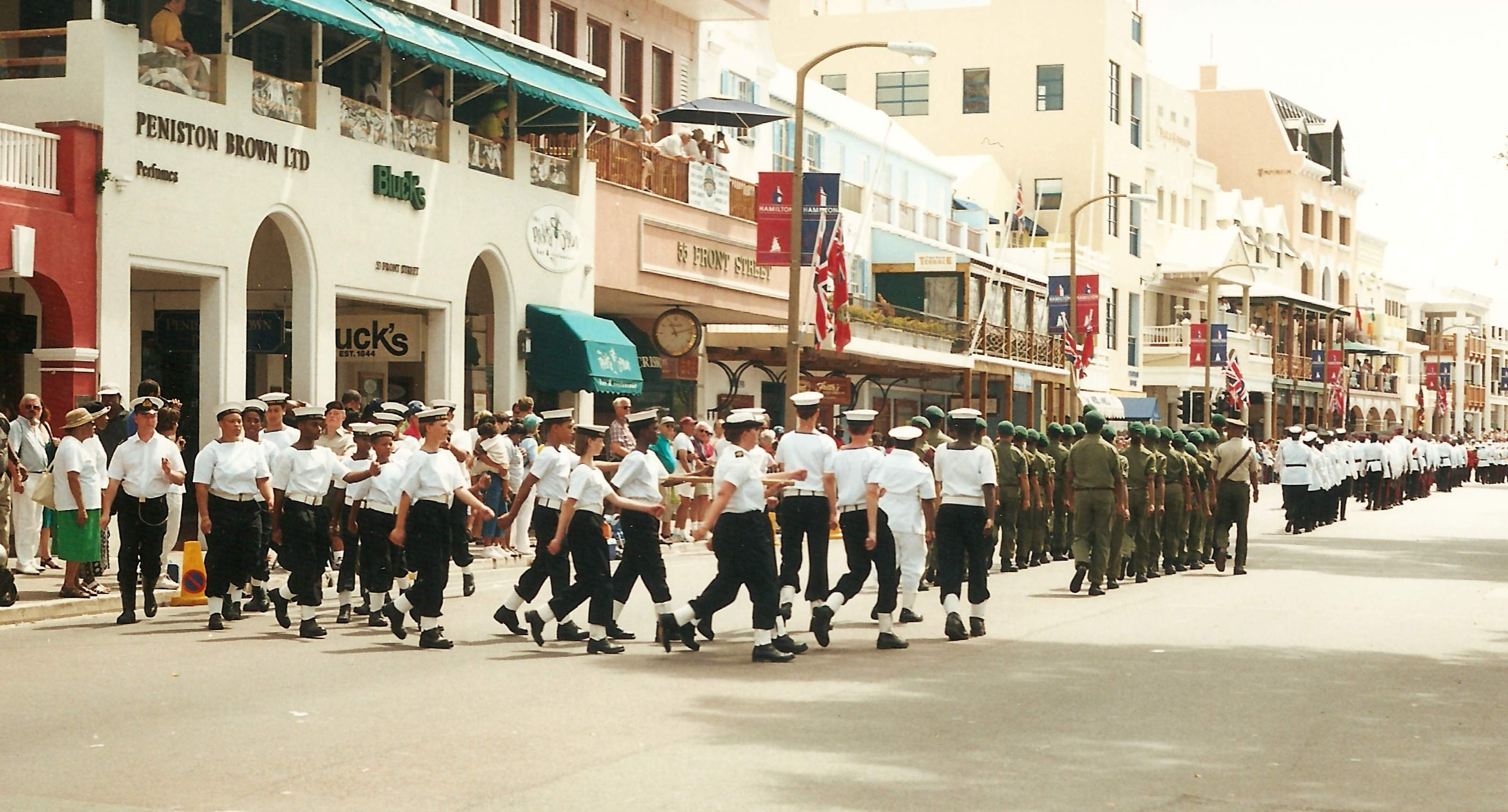
Bermuda Cadet Corps detachment (in olive green shirt-sleeve order, with green berets) in the Queen's Birthday Parade at the City of Hamilton, Bermuda, in 2000

In 1901, Saltus Grammar School in Pembroke, raised a Cadet Corps (with Sergeant Major Bellmore as the first instructor), which was attached to the Bermuda Volunteer Rifle Corps (BVRC). On 12 April 1901, the Officer Commanding Troops of the Bermuda Garrison received notification that the Governor and military Commander-in-Chief had appointed Captain R.W. Appleby of the BVRC to be a Captain with the Cadet Corps (dated 11 February). The Cadet Corps (Saltus Grammar School) often trained alongside the BVRC, as on 24 May 1902, when the cadets assembled at Fort Hamilton before marching to the Army Service Corps Wharf at East Broadway, from whence they were driven to Warwick Camp to watch the riflery training of the BVRC. In 1904, by approval of the Army Council, Lieutenant M. J. Faulks of the Cadet Corps attached to the 1st Volunteer Battalion of the Queen's Own Royal West Kent Regiment, became Captain Commanding the Cadet Corps attached to the Bermuda Volunteer Rifle Corps (Bermuda Volunteer Rifle Corps Corps Orders for April, 1904, by Major R. W. Appleby, commanding, Fort Hamilton, 1st April, 1904). In 1905, the corps received a grant from the Government of Bermuda in order that other schools might join the scheme. At the same time, the corps was officially affiliated with the BVRC.

On 24 May 1907, the Cadet Corps was delivered, along with the Headquarters and "C" Companies of the BVRC, to St. George's to join the other two companies of the BVRC for their annual camp. The Cadet Corps was perceived by the Government as a valuable method by which to boost recruitment into the BVRC, which was struggling to maintain its mandated strength. It was thought that, following their early exposure to military service, many Cadets would choose to enlist into the BVRC upon finishing their schooling.

In 1907, the Cadet Corps was expanded with War Office approval to eight other schools in Bermuda, including civilian schools such as Whitney Institute, as well as the military garrison schools, and the Royal Naval Dockyard school. The expanded Cadet Corps remained attached to the BVRC, and its Cadets wore the BVRC cap badge. At the time, all of the schools included barred black students, and the Cadet Corps (like the BVRC, which originally recruited from private rifle clubs, none of which admitted coloured members) was consequently made up of whites only. This was despite Lieutenant-General Sir Robert MacGregor Stewart, Royal Artillery, Governor of Bermuda from 1904 to 1907, having reported on 24 July 1906, to the Secretary of State for the Colonies that the Colonial Secretary of Bermuda had advised in the Executive Council against forming a cadet corps for white boys that excluded coloured boys.

There was a second part-time military unit in Bermuda, the Bermuda Militia Artillery, which recruited primarily coloured soldiers, although its officers were all white until 1953.

In 1930, the Labour Government disassociated Cadet Corps in Britain from the Government, but this was reversed by the succeeding Government in 1931, which placed them again under War Office control. The Bermuda Cadet Corps was affiliated with the National Cadet Corps in Britain in 1931 at the request of the Command Headquarters of the Bermuda Garrison.

The Bermuda Cadet Corps was very active during the Second World War, when all of the part-time reserve units were embodied for the duration, and all military-aged, male British nationals in Bermuda who were not already serving or exempted (due to occupation, infirmity, or hardship) from serving were conscripted. This meant that most cadets exiting the corps on graduation from secondary school went directly into full-time military service on turning eighteen. War service was not limited to former cadets of the Corps. Bernard John Abbott, a pre-war school Headmaster and Bermuda Cadet Corps officer, was re-commissioned into the Bermuda Volunteer Rifle Corps’ Emergency Reserve of officers with the rank of Second-Lieutenant (Acting Major) in accordance with a War Office cable of 4 May 1939. He was among the members of the contingent from the Bermuda Volunteer Rifle Corps that went to the Lincolnshire Regiment in England in June, 1940, and he ended the war as a staff officer in the Far East. The 25 December 1945, London Gazette recorded “War Subs. Maj. H. J. ABBOTT .(108051) relinquishes his commn., 26th Dec. 1945, and is granted the hon. rank of Lt.-Col.”.

A separate unit for coloured boys was created at Berkeley Institute in 1943, titled the Berkeley Institute Cadet Corps, with the Officer Commanding being Captain J.M. Rosewarne. This was attached to the Bermuda Militia (the Bermuda Militia Artillery and the 1939-1946 Bermuda Militia Infantry collectively). A Government House notice dated 20 August 1943, and published in the 21 August 1943, issue of The Royal Gazette newspaper described this as the Berkeley Institute unit of the Bermuda Cadet Corps.

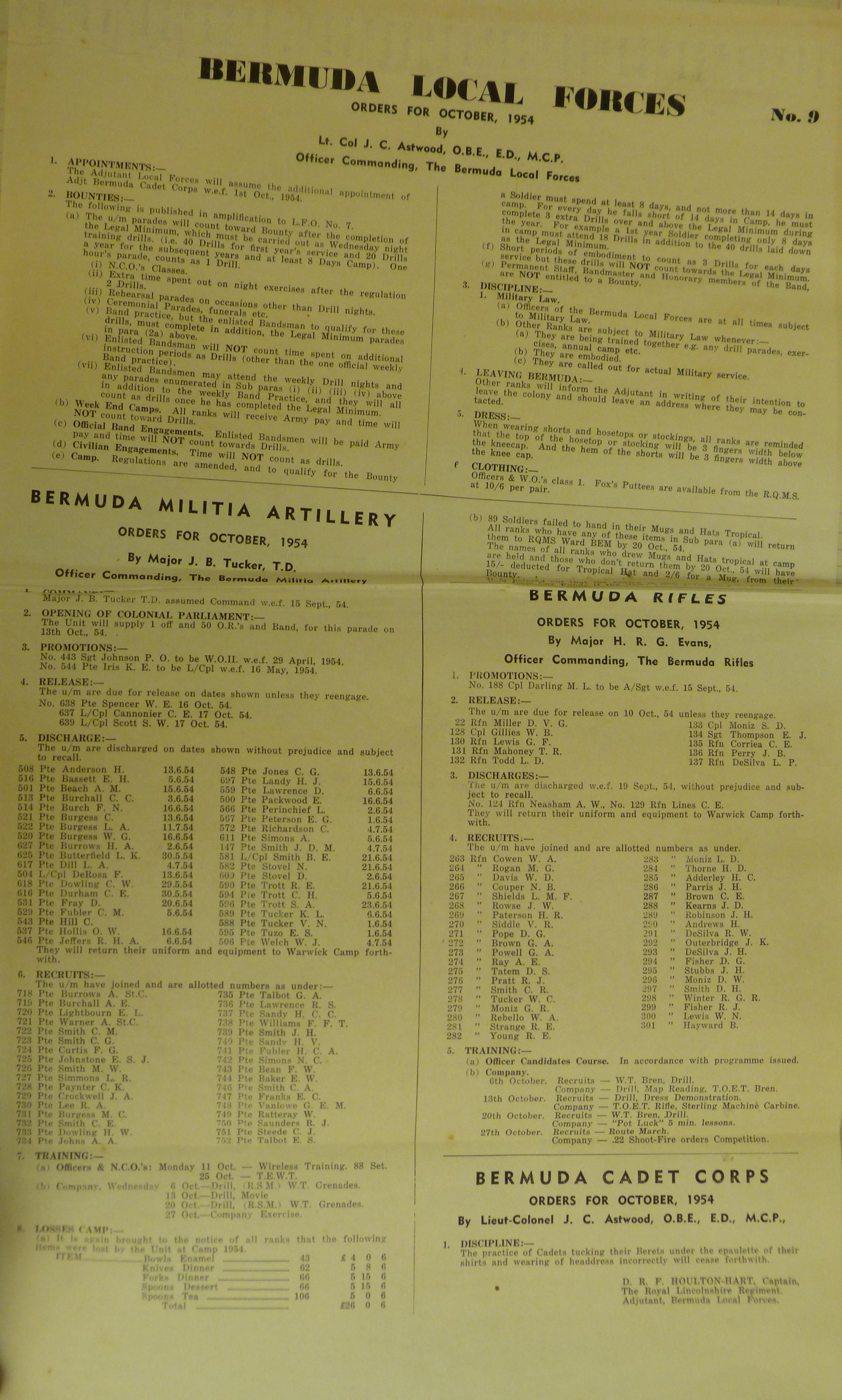
Bermuda Local Forces Orders, October 1954

The Cadet Corps was re-organised under the Bermuda Cadet Corps Act 1944. The BVRC was disbanded (along with the BMA) in 1946, with most personnel transferred to the Reserve. A skeleton staff remained to maintain facilities and equipment until both units were built back up with new recruitment in 1951, at which time the BVRC was re-titled the Bermuda Rifles. Although a common Bermuda Local Forces Headquarters was created to oversee both units (not to be confused with the overall Command Headquarters which controlled both the regular and part-time army units in Bermuda), they remained separate and blacks were still restricted to the BMA, even after the last coastal artillery was withdrawn from use in 1953 and the BMA converted to the infantry role. During the 1950s, it was decided the Bermuda Cadet Corps should have its own band. Through the influence of officers of Scottish heritage, some of whom had served in Scottish regiments during the Second World War, this was created as a Scottish bagpipe and drum band, wearing Highland dress, although the remainder of the Bermuda Cadet Corps dressed as English and Welsh regiments do.

In 1965, the BMA and the Bermuda Rifles were amalgamated to form the Bermuda Regiment (since 2015, the Royal Bermuda Regiment). The Bermuda Cadet Corps was re-organised at the same time. Officers were commissioned into the Bermuda Cadet Corps, with the senior officer appointed as Commandant. The Bermuda Regiment provided support, including a Colour Sergeant as a Full Time Instructor (FTI). Racial segregation of the public school system also ended during the 1960s, and the Bermuda Cadet Corps, now wearing its own badge, subsequently operated through all of the colony's public and Government-aided secondary schools. The Cadet Pipe Band was left out of this re-organisation, and its members chose to continue it as a private organisation, continuing to wear the Bermuda Rifles cap badge. In the 1990s, by when its membership was entirely made-up of adults, it merged with another pipe band composed primarily of Bermuda Police Service constables and Bermuda Fire Service personnel. The Bermuda Pipe Band continues to take part in military parades along with the band of the Royal Bermuda Regiment.

The training requirement for a member of the Bermuda Cadet Corps was two hours per week and a two-week annual camp.

== Disbandment ==
The Bermuda Regiment operated its own Junior Leaders programme for many years, starting with nineteen boys who passed out at Warwick Camp on 19 December 1969, thereafter forming the Junior Leaders Company. Junior Leaders wore the Bermuda Regiment cap badge, operating with the rest of the regiment from Warwick Camp. The Junior Leaders programme was absorbed into the Bermuda Cadet Corps in the mid-1990s as the Bermuda Regiment found it an unnecessary duplication to support two youth organisations. However, in 2012, due to financial constraints, the Bermuda Cadet Corps was disbanded and replaced by the resurrected Bermuda Regiment Junior Leaders. A bill was tabled in the House of Assembly of Bermuda in 2015 to formalise the organisation of the Royal Bermuda Regiment's Junior Leaders. The Bermuda Cadet Corps Act 1944 was repealed.

== Bermuda Cadet Corps ranks ==
Adult instructor Officer ranks of the Bermuda Cadet Corps
Major (Commandant)	Captain	Lieutenant	Second Lieutenant

Adult instructor Other Ranks of the Bermuda Cadet Corps
Warrant Officer Class 2 (WO2)	Colour Sergeant	Sergeant

Cadet Ranks of the Bermuda Cadet Corps
Cadet Warrant Officer Class 2 (WO2)	Cadet Colour Sergeant	Cadet Sergeant	Cadet Corporal	Cadet Lance-Corporal	Cadet Private
					No insignia

== See also ==
- Junior Leaders
