= Reginald Grey =

Reginald Grey may refer to:

- Reginald de Grey, 1st Baron Grey de Wilton (c. 1240–1308)
- Reginald Grey, 2nd Baron Grey de Ruthyn (1322–1388)
- Reginald Grey, 3rd Baron Grey de Ruthyn (1362–1440)
- Reginald Grey, 5th Earl of Kent (1541–1573)

== See also ==
- Reginald Gray (disambiguation)
