= Dudley Spurling =

Bermudian lawyer and politician

Arthur Dudley Spurling

Sir Arthur Dudley Spurling, CBE (9 November 1913 – 20 May 1986) was a Bermudian lawyer, politician, and swimmer.

== Early life and family ==
Arthur Dudley Spurling was born on 9 November 1913 to Sir Salibury Stanley Spurling and Lady Frances Ellen Spurling. He married Marian Taylor in 1941, the daughter of Frank Gurr of St George's, Bermuda. They had 3 sons and 1 daughter. The eldest son, Stephen, pre-deceased him. The other 3 children are Richard, Michael and Ann

He lived at Three Chimneys, No 5 Speaker's Drive, Wellington, St George's, Bermuda.

== Career ==
Spurling was a barrister and justice of the peace and senior partner at Appleby, Spurling & Kempe (now known simply as 'Appleby') from 1948 to 1981. He was speaker of the House of Assembly, Bermuda, 1972–76.

== Swimming ==
He competed in the men's 4 × 200 metre freestyle relay at the 1936 Summer Olympics.

== Death and legacy ==
Spurling died on 20 May 1986. A scholarship is awarded by Butterfield in his name. A Bermudian singer uses his name for his act.
