= Samuel Brownlow Gray =

Sir Samuel Brownlow Gray CMG (27 April 1823 – 20 January 1910) was a barrister in Bermuda.

== Life ==
Gray was born in St. George's, Bermuda, the son of Benjamin Charles Thomas Gray and Elizabeth Brownlow of Bermuda. He was called to the bar at Lincoln's Inn in 1847. He was Inspector of schools in Bermuda from 1848, and was in May 1861 appointed Attorney-General of Bermuda.

In May 1900, he was appointed Chief Justice of Bermuda, and he served as President of the Legislative Council. He stepped down from both positions in 1905.

== Honours ==
He was appointed a Companion of the Order of St Michael and St George (CMG) in January 1888, and knighted in the King's Birthday Honours November 1901.

== Personal life and death ==
A keen tennis player, he helped introduce the game to Bermuda.

Gray married, in 1851, Eliza Anne Trimingham, daughter of Hon. James H. Trimingham. They had two sons and three daughters (one died young). The eldest son, Sir Reginald Gray (1851-1935), was also a barrister and a politician in Bermuda. Elder daughter, Bessie Eliza Brownlow Gray (1854-1925), was an accomplished watercolourist and poet.

Sir Samuel died in Hamilton, Bermuda on 20 January 1910.
