= Rustler 36 =

Cruising yacht

Development
- Designer: Holman & Pye
- Name: Rustler 36

Boat
- Draft: 5' 6"

Hull
- Type: Monohull yacht
- Hull weight: 16,806 lb
- LOA: 35' 4"
- LWL: 26' 11"
- Beam: 11' 11"

Hull appendages
- Keel: Long keel

Rig
- Rig type: Bermudan sloop

Sails
- Total sail area: 693 ft^{2}

The Rustler 36 is a cruising yacht produced by Rustler Yachts of Falmouth. First produced in the early 1980s by Orion Marine, the yacht is of modern GRP construction, but retains the well ballasted long keel and strong construction of the traditional British sailing yacht. The high standard of construction and traditional highly seaworthy profile differentiate it from cheaper, more lightly built mass production yachts such as the Beneteau range.

The Rustler 36 is the yacht most participants selected to use in the 2018 Golden Globe Race, with 6 of the 18 sailors sailing it. Only 5 out of 18 boats finished the race, the winner was Jean-Luc Van Den Heede on the Rustler 36 Matmut, the second- and third-placed boats were also Rustler 36.

== See also ==
- Rustler Yachts
- Rustler 33
- Rustler 37
