= Rustler Yachts =

British yachtbuilder

- Company type: Limited company
- Industry: Yacht building
- Predecessor: Ralph Hogg
- Headquarters: Falmouth, Cornwall, UK
- Parent: Falmouth Maritime Group
- Divisions: Bowman Yachts
- Website: www.rustleryachts.com

Rustler Yachts is a British yachtbuilder based in Falmouth, Cornwall, with a reputation for handbuilding high quality, semi-custom yachts. The yachts are primarily cruising-orientated designs, built from glassfibre composite, with traditional hull forms and heavily built construction.

== History ==
The origins of Rustler are in the mid-1960s, when Kim Holman designed the Rustler 31 for Russell Anstey of Poole (hence the name Rustler, a play on Russell). Russell started Anstey Yachts and built the first thirty five or so. The molds were then sold on and she was built by various companies. In the early 1980s, Orion Marine and its founder Ralph Hogg began building the traditional Rustler 36 design.

The Rustler 42, launched in 1999, was the first in the new direction for Rustler. Designed by Stephen Jones, designer of the Starlight 35, and Starlight 39, the Rustler 42 was seen as the quintessential bluewater cruiser. She marked the start of an ongoing relationship with Stephen Jones (now having designed its 33, 37, 42, 44, and most recently the 57) In 2005 Rustler moved to a newly built waterside factory in Penryn. Rustler also built yachts under the Bowman brand since the acquisition of Rival Bowman in 2002, and until 2011 also produced yachts under the Starlight brand.

In 2007, Rustler introduced the Rustler 44, an elongated, taller version of the Rustler 42, with a raised deck saloon.

In 2009, the first daysailer was introduced, the Rustler 24, followed by the Rustler 33 in 2011.

In 2014, the modern replacement for the long-keel Ruster 36 was introduced. Although the Rustler 36 is still available, the Rustler 37 offers increased hull volume and an encapsulated long fin keel, instead of the long keel on the Kim Holman design.

Its largest yachts to date is the Rustler 57, launched in 2019 (2021).

== Range ==
- Rustler 24
- Rustler 33
- Rustler 36
- Rustler 37
- Rustler 42
- Rustler 44
- Rustler 57

== See also ==
- Bowman Yachts
- List of sailboat designers and manufacturers
