= Reginald Gray (barrister) =

Bermudian barrister and politician

Sir Reginald Gray KC (29 December 1851–15 September 1935) was a Bermudian barrister and politician.

The son of Sir Samuel Brownlow Gray, Attorney-General and Chief Justice of Bermuda, Gray was educated at Burlington House School in London and was called to the bar by the Inner Temple in 1875.

Returning to his native Bermuda to practise, he was a member of the House of Assembly from 1895 until 1928. He served as Attorney-General of Bermuda from 1900 to 1919 and Speaker of the House of Assembly from 1921 to 1929.

In 1884, Gray compiled Laws of Bermuda from 1690 to 1883. In 1903 he updated the work to 1902.

He was knighted in the 1920 New Year Honours.

Gray was also the Croquet Open Champion in 1875 and runner up in 1874 and 1876.
