= Royal Reserve Regiments =

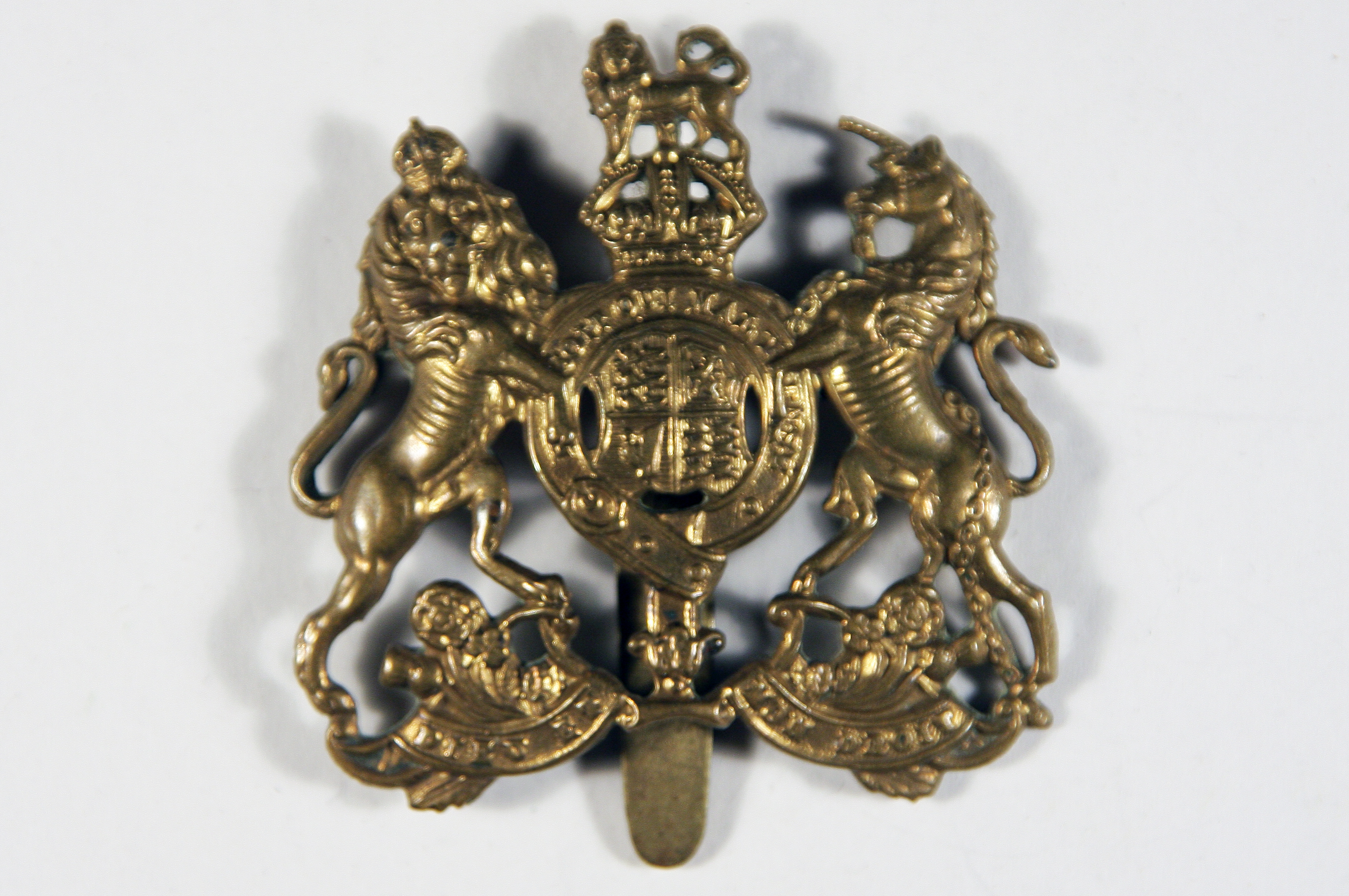
- The English regiments of the Royal Reserve Regiments wore the same cap badge as the General Service Corps, the Royal Garrison Regiment, the Bermuda Militia Infantry and other units without a unique badge
- Active: 1900-1901
- Country: (United Kingdom and colonies)
- Branch: Army
- Type: Infantry

The Royal Reserve Regiments were reserve infantry and cavalry regiments of the British Army in existence from 1900 to 1901.

The Second Boer War broke out in South Africa in October 1899. By December, the British army had seen several defeats in battle, and was unable to lift the sieges of Ladysmith, Mafeking and Kimberley as fast as had been communicated to the public. The government realised they needed considerably more troops to win the war, and larger parts of the regular army, militia and yeomanry regiments were sent to South Africa. Due to the manpower needs of the army, an appeal came from Queen Victoria in February 1900 for ex-soldiers to sign up for Home Defence duties. The following letter appeared in newspapers at the time, signed by Sir Arthur Bigge, Private Secretary to the Sovereign:

Osborne, Feb 17, 1900

To Field-Marshal the Viscount Wolseley KP, Commander in Chief

My Dear Lord Wolseley

As so large a proportion of the Army is now in South Africa, the Queen fully realizes that necessary measures must be adopted for home defence. Her Majesty is advised that it would be possible to raise for one year an efficient force from her old soldiers who have already served as officers, non-commissioned officers, or privates. Confident in their devotion to country and loyalty to her Throne, the Queen appeals to them to serve once more in place of those who for a time are absent from these islands, and who, side by side with the people of her colonies, are nobly resisting the invasion of her South African possessions. Her Majesty has signalled her pleasure that these battalions shall be designated 'Royal Reserve Battalions' of her Army.

Yours very truly

Arthur Bigge

Shortly thereafter, Royal Reserve battalions were formed from veteran soldiers in the United Kingdom for Home Service. Time-expired warrant officers, non commissioned officers and other ranks between the ages of 21 and 45 would enlist for service in the United Kingdom for a period of one year and receive a bounty of £22.

For the cavalry, those enlisting were grouped into Reserve Regiments named after the different classes of mounted troops, as follows:

- Her Majesty's Reserve Regiment of Dragoon Guards
- Her Majesty's Reserve Regiment of Dragoons
- Her Majesty's Reserve Regiment of Hussars
- Her Majesty's Reserve Regiment of Lancers

For the infantry, these Royal Reserve Battalions were grouped into Royal Reserve Regiments, with the following titles:

- Royal Guards Reserve Regiment
- Royal Home Counties Reserve Regiment (2 battalions)
- Royal Northern Reserve Regiment (4 battalions)
- Royal Rifles Reserve Regiment (2 battalions)
- Royal Southern Reserve Regiment (2 battalions)
- Royal Lancashire Reserve Regiment (2 battalions)
- Royal Scottish Reserve Regiment (2 battalions)
- Royal Eastern Counties Reserve Regiment
- Royal Irish Reserve Regiment
- Royal Irish Fusiliers Reserve Regiment

Recruiting was enthusiastic, and by the second week of May 1900, 29,000 applications for enrolments had been received, and 14 battalions of infantry had been formed, comprising 128 officers and 15,321 men. In total, 18 battalions were raised, officered partly by those who were already compulsorily in the Reserve, and partly by ex-officers who voluntarily responded to the call "for Queen and Country". Many of the other ranks also enlisted on their one-year engagement from loyalty to the Queen, but quite a number principally joined up to claim the large bounty which was on offer.

The men were used for routine duties and ceremonial tasks, for example furnishing the guard at Osborne, and lining the route for the funeral of Queen Victoria. The task of keeping everyone occupied were reported to be rather difficult, however.

The Regiments were disbanded at the end of 1901, when the Second Boer War drew to its close.

After the Royal Reserve Regiments were phased out, the Royal Garrison Regiment was formed, to relieve regular infantry battalions in overseas garrisons such as the Imperial fortresses of Malta (1st, 3rd and 4th Battalions) and Gibraltar (2nd Battalion). The garrison of the third Imperial fortress, 21-square mile Bermuda, which had been part of British North America and linked militarily with a fourth Imperial fortress, Nova Scotia, until the Confederation of Canada had transferred military control of that province, other than a small defensive British Army garrison for the Royal Naval Dockyard, Halifax (from 1902 to 1905, the 5th Battalion, Royal Garrison Regiment]) 'til that transferred to the new Royal Canadian Navy along with the Esquimalt Royal Navy Dockyard in British Columbia in 1905) to the new Dominion government, had included two regular infantry battalions supported by three companies of the Bermuda Volunteer Rifle Corps, before the Second Boer War (with a third regular battalion added during the war to guard prisoner-of-war camps on the islands of the Great Sound), and in the post war economy was reduced to one. Many of the RGR's members had previously been in one of the Royal Reserve Regiments.
