= Caribbean Regiment =

Military unit of the British Army during WW II

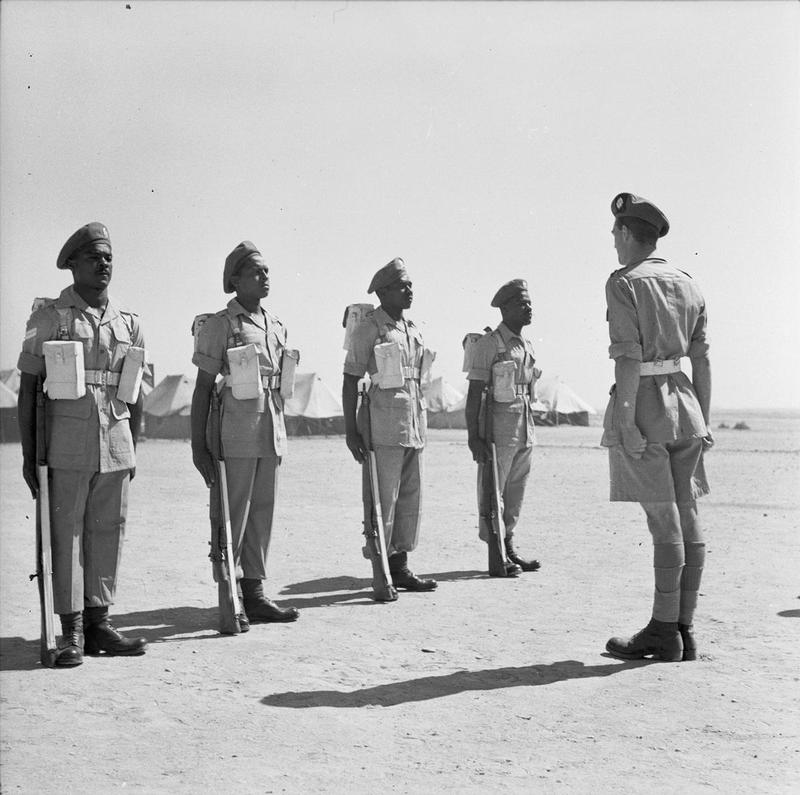
- Caribbean Regiment soldiers in Egypt
- Active: 1944–1946
- Country: United Kingdom
- Branch: British Army
- Type: Infantry
- Engagements: World War II: Mediterranean and Middle East theatre of World War II

The Caribbean Regiment (fully the First Caribbean Regiment or 1st Caribbean Regiment, and sometimes referred to as the Carib Regiment) was a regiment of the British Army during the Second World War. The regiment went overseas in July 1944 and saw service in Italy, Egypt and Palestine.

== History ==
There had been resistance from the War Office to forming a new West Indian regiment, but those who made their own way to the UK were able to enlist in the British Army. Nearly 10,000 British West Indians travelled and joined the army in Britain. Following discussion between the Colonial Office and the War Office, the Caribbean Regiment was formed in April 1944 of 4,000 volunteers. The recruits were drawn from the Imperial fortress of Bermuda and all over the British West Indies; most were members of local Volunteer Defence Forces. A few officers and non-commissioned Officers were also drafted in from other British Army units.

Many Bermudians were already serving in various regiments and corps of the army (a Bermudian officer becoming a prisoner-of-war at Dunkirk), as well as in the Royal Navy and the Royal Air Force (the first Bermudian killed in the war having been fighter pilot Flying Officer Herman Francis Grant Ede, DFC, of No. 263 Squadron RAF, killed on the 8 June 1940, when the aircraft carrier HMS Glorious was sunk while evacuating 263 Squadron and 46 Squadron from the Battle of Norway) when the Second World War began, with many others joining thereafter.

In Bermuda, the manpower of the reserve units (the Bermuda Militia Artillery and the Bermuda Volunteer Rifle Corps, raised in the 1890s, had been joined in 1931 by the Bermuda Volunteer Engineers and in 1939 by Bermuda Militia Infantry), recruited primarily to defend the dockyard (which had been joined in the 1930s by the Royal Naval Air Station Bermuda and RAF Darrell's Island, the pre-war international airport which had been taken over by the Royal Air Force as a staging point for trans-Atlantic flight) was increased by additional recruiting, which began before the declaration of war (The Bermuda Militia Artillery and the Bermuda Volunteer Engineers had been embodied and mobilised for full-time service at mid-day on 24 August 1939, in anticipation of the 1 September invasion of Poland by Germany, and preparatory to the 3 September declaration of war against Germany, with the Bermuda Volunteer Rifle Corps preparing for embodiment, but not actually embodied until 4 September 1939; the Bermuda Militia Infantry was formed after the declaration of war), but with the regular component of the garrison having been drastically reduced during post-First World War cutbacks to the regular army, the garrison would remain under-strength 'til the establishment of the Bermuda Base Command of the United States Army. Despite this, and the threat posed by German surface vessels, submarines, and aircraft, as during the First World War (when the Bermuda Militia Artillery and the Bermuda Volunteer Rifle Corps had each sent two contingents to the Western Front) volunteers from the local units were soon formed into a contingent for overseas service. This was nominally a Bermuda Volunteer Rifle Corps contingent to the Lincolnshire Regiment, but a handful of volunteers from the Bermuda Militia Artillery and Bermuda Volunteer Engineers were attached for the transit, separating to join their parent corps in England. This contingent departed Bermuda in June, 1940, following which concern of denuding the garrison meant a moratorium was placed on any further drafts being sent overseas by the local units (although many soldiers were to train as pilots at the Bermuda Flying School on Darrell's Island, and those that qualified were discharged and transferred to the Royal Air Force). By 1943, the United States Army and United States Marine Corps establishment in Bermuda was larger than that of the British Army, the threat posed by the German navy had greatly diminished, and the moratorium against overseas contingents was lifted.

A detachment of 104 officers and men (Major W. W. Fuller in command, three other commissioned officers, one warrant officer, 2 Company Quarter Master Sergeants, 3 other sergeants, 14 junior non-commissioned officers, and 80 privates) from the Bermuda Militia Artillery and Bermuda Militia Infantry (conscription had been introduced to Bermuda shortly after the declaration of war, but those servicemen who were drafted to the Caribbean Regiment volunteered to serve overseas), arrived on two ships on 13 and 23 April 1944 to form the training cadre of the new regiment at Fort Eustis, a US Army base near Williamsburg, Virginia.

The Bermudians prepared for the arrival of the volunteers from West Indian colonies (which had been divided militarily into South Caribbean and North Caribbean areas), who meanwhile had collected into two contingents beginning on 1 April 1944, one at Trinidad and the other at Jamaica. They arrived under the command of Lieutenant-Colonel Hugh Wilkin, OBE, MC, The Queen's Own (Royal West Kent Regiment), who became the Commanding Officer of the new regiment. Whether a badge was authorised for the regiment is unclear. Although created as a regular line infantry regiment of the British Army, the regiment never appeared in the Army List, in which the badge of a unit, if one was authorised, is described. At least some of the Bermudians wore the General Service Corps cap badge, which was used by the Bermuda Militia Infantry (for which no unique badge had been authorised) while serving with the Caribbean Regiment. A blue, yellow, and green regimental flash was authorised for the Caribbean Regiment, and the Bermudian contingent was authorised to wear the name Bermuda as a distinguishing mark.

In order of the number of strength, the regiment was made up of drafts from Trinidad (22%), Jamaica (at the time including the Turks and Caicos Islands), Barbados, British Guiana, Bermuda, the Windward Islands, and the Leeward Islands. Newly recruited men were tested in Virginia for fitness, with those not found fit returned to their colonies. With more experience, and a generally higher degree of education, many of the Bermudian men were made non-commissioned officers and distributed around the regiment. Some of the South Caribbean soldiers had already trained for deployment to the Pacific. The Bermuda Militia Artillery and Bermuda Militia Infantry contingent had previously joined with the Bermuda Volunteer Rifle Corps' Second Contingent to the Lincolnshire Regiment in 1943 to form the temporary Command Training Battalion, stationed at Prospect Camp (the location of the Command Headquarters of the Bermuda Garrison) while training for the war in Europe (the two contingents had separated before proceeding overseas).

The new regiment trained in Virginia, where the regiment was the first to celebrate the King's birthday in the U.S. since the American Revolution. The King's Birthday Parade was attended by Lieutenant-General Sir Gordon Nevil Macready, 2nd Baronet KBE, CB, CMG, DSO, MC, the Head of Mission of the British Army staff in Washington DC, who reviewed the regiment and presented the Commanding Officer with special messages from the Secretary of State for War and the Secretary of State for the Colonies. The message from the Secretary of State for War (Sir Percy James Grigg, KCB, KCSI, PC) read:

I should like to send to you and to all the officers and men in your batallion my best wishes on your departure for an active theatre of operations. The army is glad to welcome you and I feel sure that the men from the Caribbean and Bermuda will carry on the fine traditions founded by their fathers in the last war.

The message from the Secretary of State for the Colonies (Major (Honorary Colonel, TA) Oliver Stanley, MC PC MP, Royal Field Artillery) read:

Now that your battalion has left its home base to take its place overseas with Allied Forces, I should like to send you and all ranks my best wishes for your success. I know how much you and your friends in the Caribbean and Bermuda have wished for this opportunity, and I have no doubt that you will make the very most of it, and that your bearing and discipline, in all circumstances, will fulfil the high expectation of us all. Good luck to all of you.

The Regiment left the US for Oran, in North Africa, in June 1944. Oran was handed over to Free French Forces before their arrival, and the Regiment went on to Naples, Italy, in July 1944, where it was employed in general duties behind the front line. L/BDA/95 Private W.C. Baxter of the Bermuda Militia Infantry died there on 4 September 1944 of an abscess of the liver and was buried at the Naples War Cemetery. In October, it escorted 4,000 German prisoners of war from Italy to Egypt, where it was used in mine clearance work around the Suez Canal area.

The regiment never saw front line action. This was due partly to inadequate training (with only a single battalion, it had not trained as part of a larger brigade; the smallest unit the British Army normally fielded on its own) and partly because of the anticipated political impact in the British West Indies if heavy casualties had been incurred.

The Caribbean Regiment left Port Said in December 1945 on the troopship Highland Monarch, reaching St. George's Town, Bermuda, on 5 January 1946. The Bermudian contingent disembarked there and was transferred by the rescue tug HMS St. Blazey to the City of Hamilton, from where the one-hundred officers and other ranks were driven in lorries to Prospect Camp. The remainder of the Regiment departed Bermuda aboard Highland Monarch for the West Indies, where the Regiment was disbanded (the ship, which also carried other British armed forces personnel returning to their homes, then continued on to Buenos Aires, Argentina, where it collected the crew of the Graf Spee and other Germans for repatriation to Germany). The Bermudian contingent members were returned to their original unit (the Bermuda Militia Artillery, into which the remaining personnel of the Bermuda Militia Infantry had been transferred) before being placed on the Reserve and discharged from active service. Some were recalled to form part of the contingent sent from the various Bermuda-raised units to the London Victory Celebrations of 1946, and placed back onto the Reserve on their return to Bermuda.

== Gallery ==
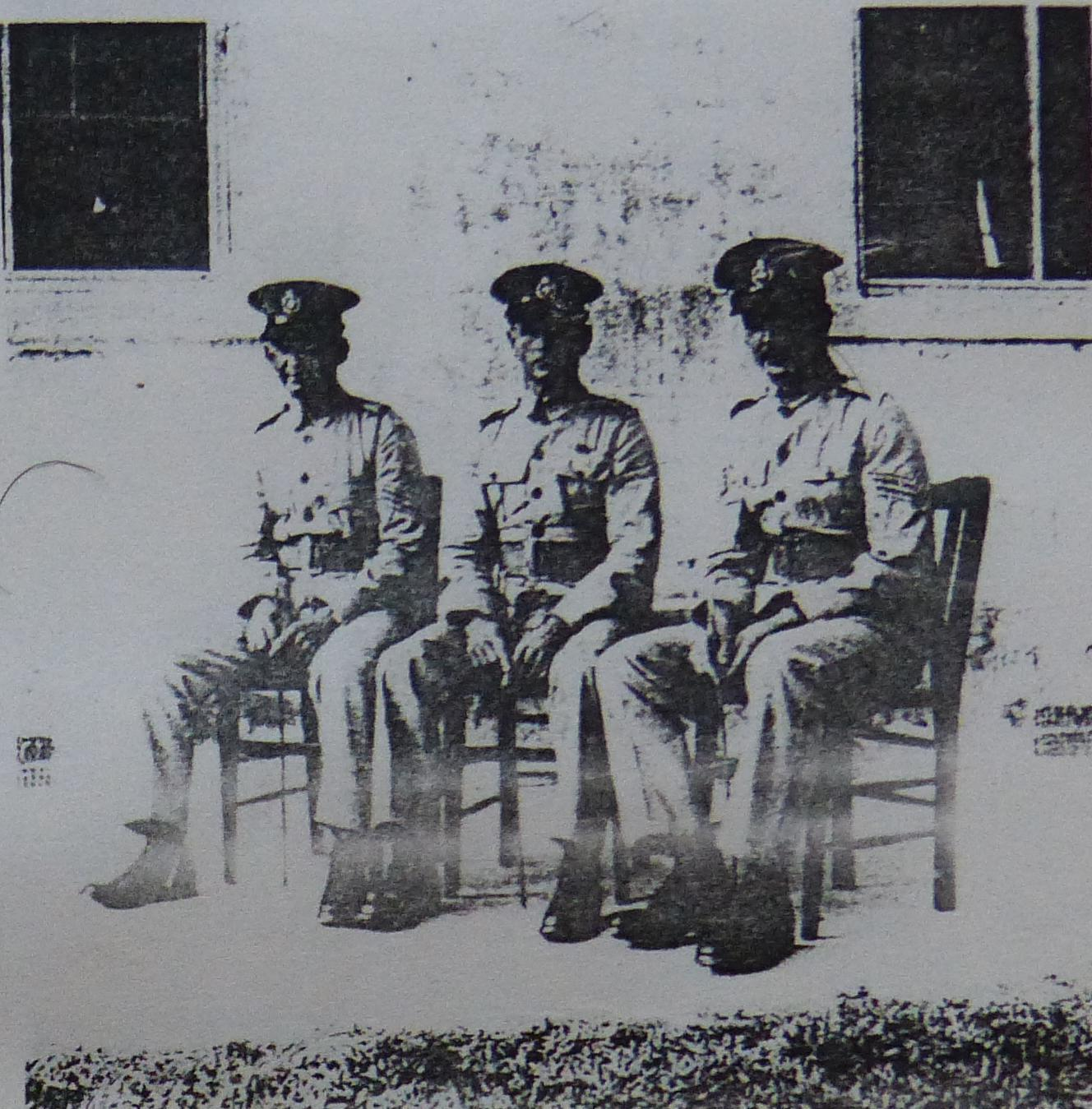
Bermudian CSM Edward A. Lee (right) of the Caribbean Regiment circa 1940, during his earlier service with the Bermuda Volunteer Rifle Corps.

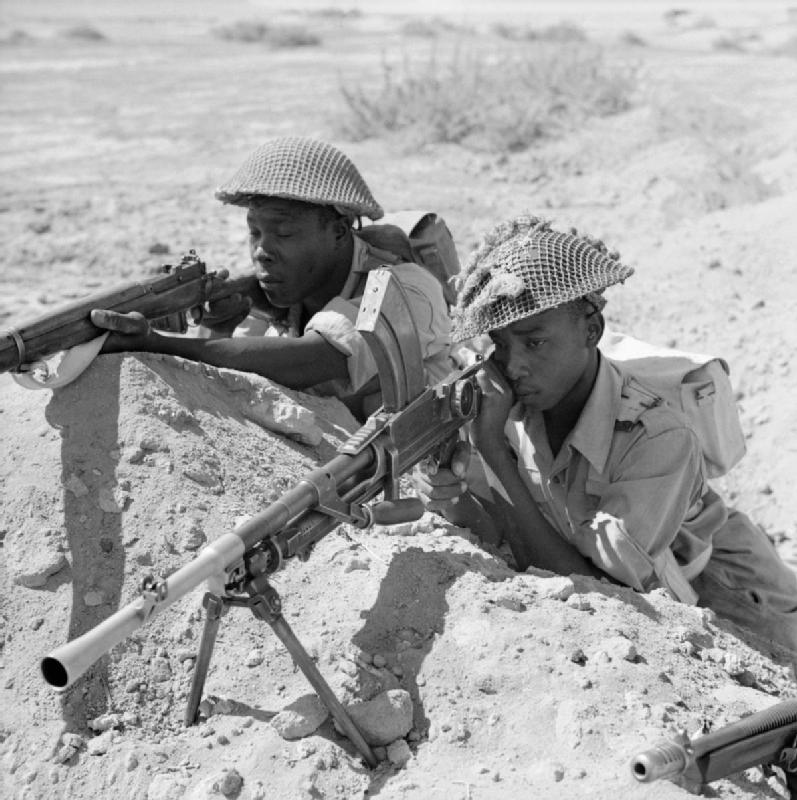
1st Battalion, Caribbean Regiment soldiers armed with a Lee-Enfield No. 4 rifle and Bren light machine gun training in Egypt in 1945

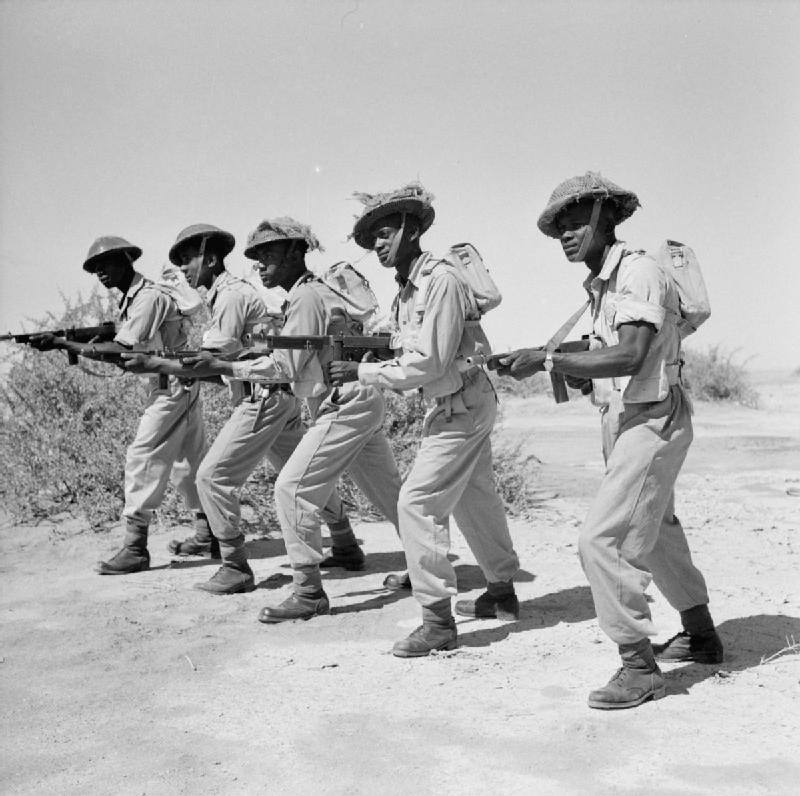
1st Battalion, Caribbean Regiment soldiers train with the Thompson submachine gun in Egypt in 1945

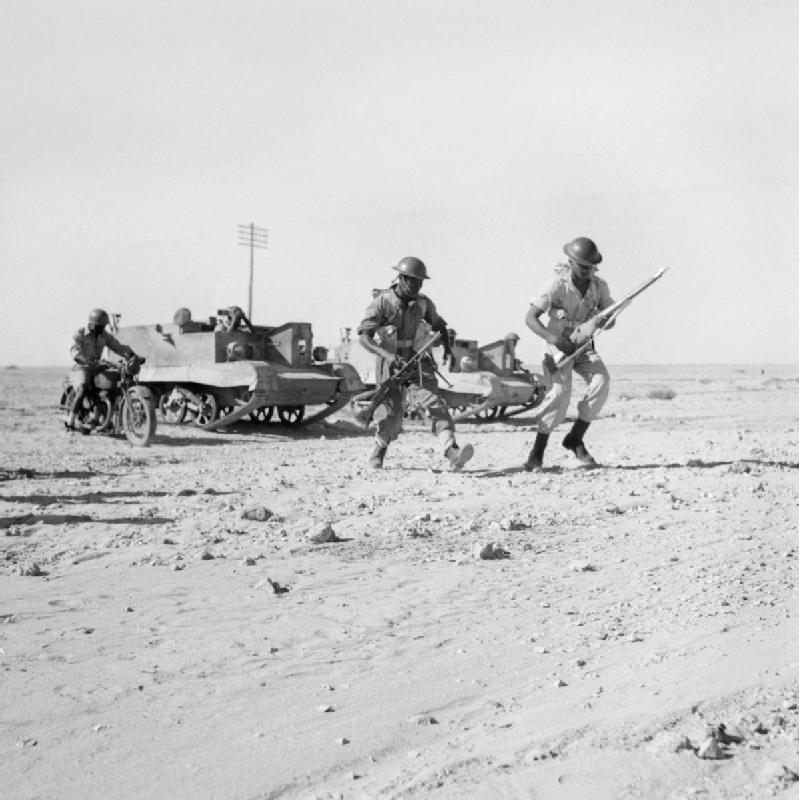
1st Battalion, Caribbean Regiment soldiers training in Egypt rush from a Universal carrier to take up position with a Bren gun in 1945

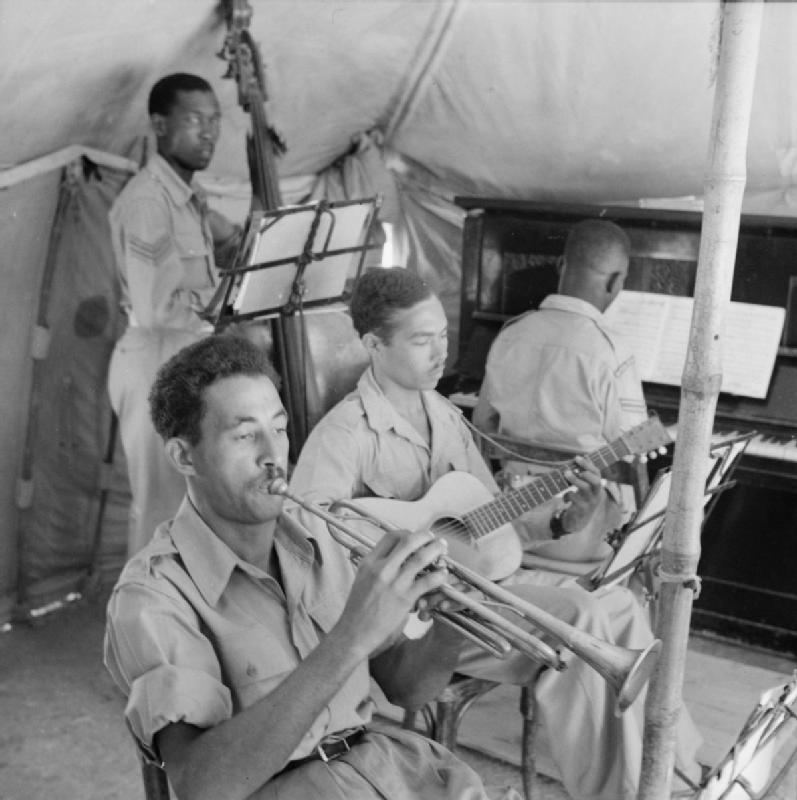
1st Battalion, Caribbean Regiment dance band in Egypt in 1945

== See also ==
- West India Regiments
- British West Indies Regiment
- Jewish Brigade
