= Bermuda Militia Infantry =

The Bermuda Militia Infantry
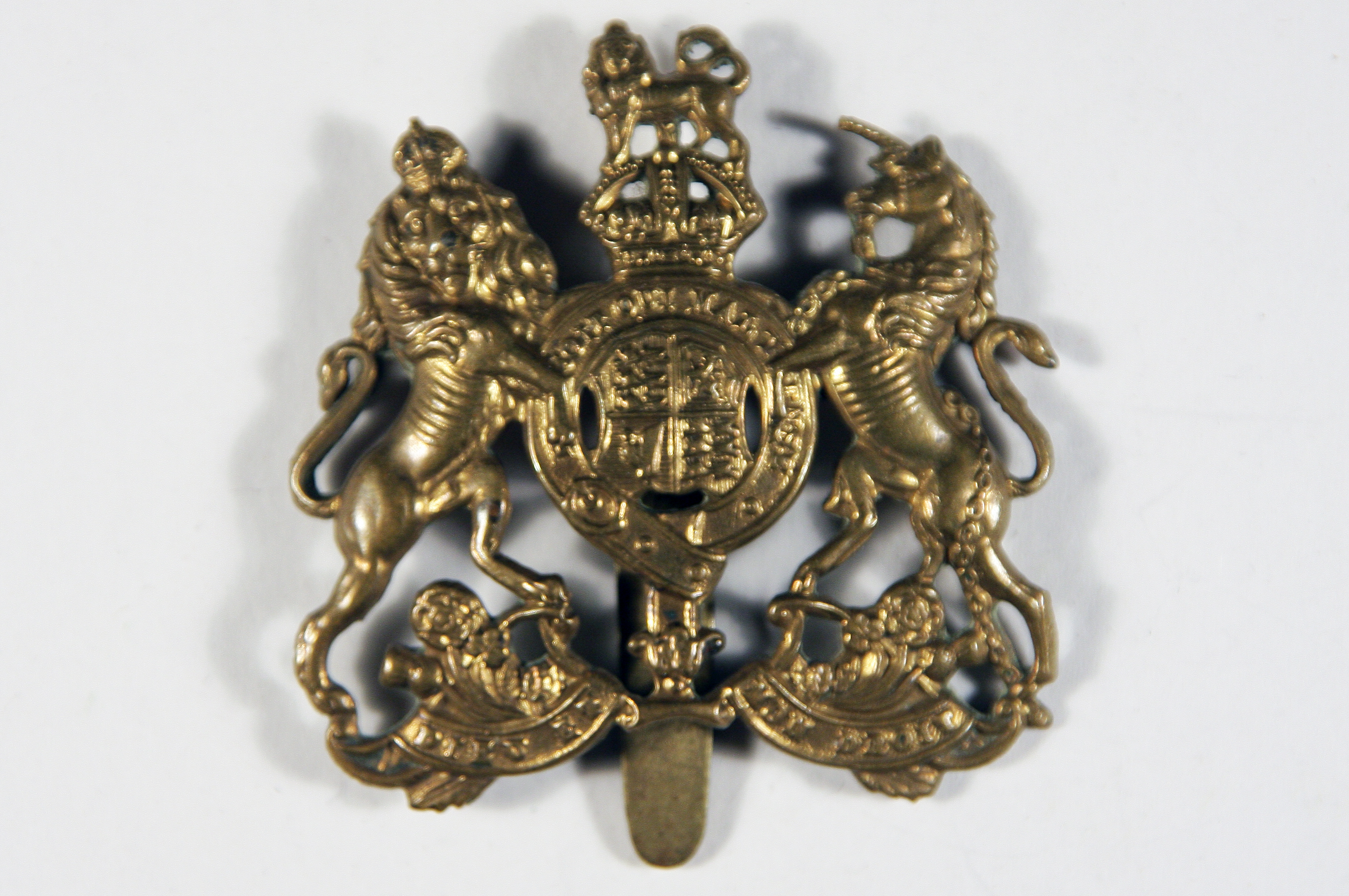
- The Bermuda Militia Infantry wore the same cap badge as the General Service Corps, the Royal Garrison Regiment, English regiments of the Royal Reserve Regiments and other British Army units without a unique badge
- Active: 1939-1946
- Country: Bermuda (United Kingdom overseas territory)
- Branch: Army
- Type: Infantry
- Garrison/HQ: Bermuda Garrison

The Bermuda Militia Infantry was raised in 1939 as a part-time reserve of the British Army's Bermuda Garrison.

== History ==
=== The Bermuda Garrison ===
The Parliament of Bermuda had authorised three part-time reserve units in 1892 to re-inforce the regular army detachments to the Bermuda Garrison. These replaced the original militia, raised in 1612, which had been raised under Militia Acts that required periodic renewal. The local government saw the militia as an unnecessary expense following the buildup of the regular army garrison (that resulted from Bermuda's becoming the primary base for the Royal Navy in the western North Atlantic following American independence), and simply stopped renewing the Militia Act after the American War of 1812, allowing the militia to fade away.

Despite short-lived attempts to raise militias without the aid or funds of the local government, a permanent reserve would not exist 'til the first of the three units authorised in 1892, the Bermuda Volunteer Rifle Corps (BVRC), was raised in 1894 as a reserve for the regular infantry force (which normally numbered one battalion posted to Prospect Camp. Various battalions were posted to Bermuda, normally for three years at a time. On occasions of heightened tensions, a second infantry battalion was sometimes posted to Bermuda. The BVRC was split into four companies, including three rifle companies and a headquarters company, with the archipelago divided between them into Western, Central, and Eastern areas of operation.

In 1895, the Bermuda Militia Artillery (BMA) was raised as a reserve for the two regular companies of Royal Artillery (from 1899 to 1924, the Royal Garrison Artillery), manning the various coastal artillery batteries in Bermuda, most of which were clustered in the fortified East End of Bermuda, where the only safe passage for sizeable vessels lay through the surrounding barrier reef. The Royal Engineers and the Royal Artillery had taken over and improved the fortifications of the old militia, and built many new ones. By the middle of the 19th century, they had emplaced roughly five hundred artillery pieces around Bermuda; vastly more than there existed trained gunners to man. Due to rapid advances in artillery in the latter 19th century, many of the forts, and most of the guns, were obsolete before the turn of the century, but the part-time reserve was still vital to the effectiveness of the garrison. The BMA provided detachments to batteries around Bermuda, but was centred on the St. David's Battery, which was the Examination Battery, overlooking the entrance through the reefs where arriving vessels were inspected by the Royal Navy before being allowed to proceed inwards.

The third reserve unit, a submarine mining militia meant to operate boats in support of 27th (Submarine Mining) Company, Royal Engineers, which had been assigned to Bermuda in 1888 to maintain and operate underwater mines, was never raised. In 1900 the Royal Engineers Submarine Mining Companies also assumed responsibility for operating electric searchlights defending harbours.

The BVRC restricted its recruitment to whites (initially by recruiting only members of private rifle clubs, as all the Bermudian rifle clubs at that time barred non-white members). The majority of the BMA's recruits were coloured (understood at that time, in Bermuda, as anyone not able to be described as wholly white), but all of its officers were white.

The BVRC and the BMA sent two drafts each to the Western Front during the First World War (the former, in 1915 and 1916 to the Lincolnshire Regiment; the latter in 1916 and 1917 to the Royal Garrison Artillery). After the war, the British Government increasingly curtailed its defence spending in Bermuda, withdrawing regular army units and transferring ever more of their duties to the part-time units, which were re-organised along Territorial Army lines in the 1920s. In 1928, the Royal Artillery and Royal Engineers companies were withdrawn. The BMA took over complete responsibility for manning the coastal artillery batteries, of which only St. David's Battery was still active by 1939. The Bermuda Volunteer Engineers (BVE) was raised in 1931 to take on the role of operating electric search lights at the batteries (in 1940, they also took on responsibility for signals within the garrison).

By 1939, with war looming, the BMA, with a single battery of coastal artillery, did not allow full use to be made of the available coloured manpower of Bermuda, even with the construction that year of a new battery of two 6-inch guns at Warwick Camp.

The territorial units in Bermuda were mobilised on 3 September 1939, on the declaration of war against Germany by Prime Minister Neville Chamberlain. Serving soldiers were embodied full-time for the duration of the war, and conscription was quickly introduced to add to their numbers. A succession of British Army and Canadian Army battalions were posted to Prospect Camp through the war.

=== Creation of the Bermuda Militia Infantry ===
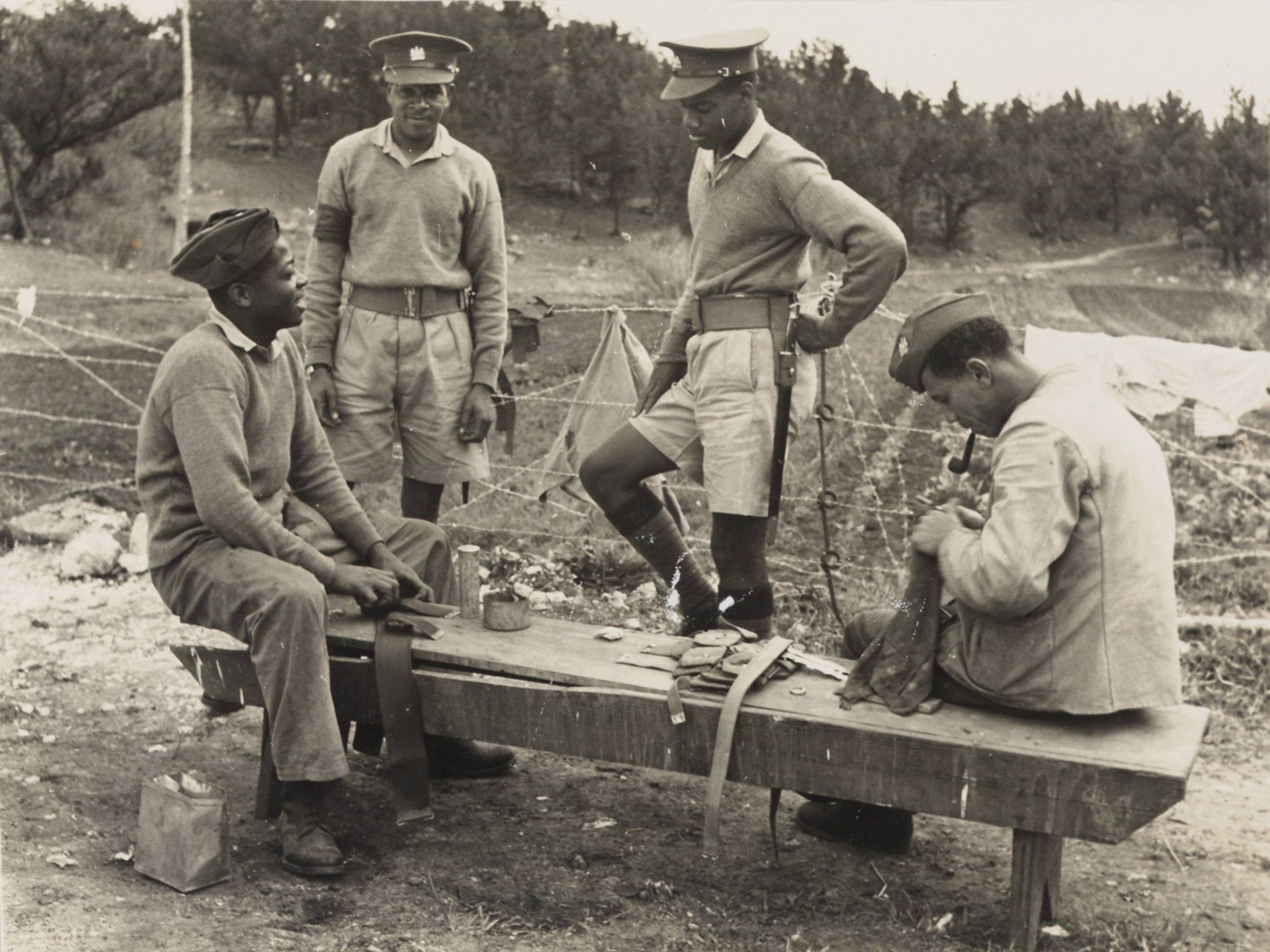
Bermuda Militia Infantry soldiers in camp

On 6 October 1939, the Bermuda Militia Infantry was created at St. David's Battery under Lieutenant JTO Redmond, BVRC, who was appointed Officer Commanding. Second-Lieutenants JER King and WW Fuller were commissioned at the same time. Grouped administratively with the BMA, it was originally tasked with the defence of the battery with a force of three officers and sixty enlistedmen. Like the BMA, it recruited coloured other ranks, but all of its officers were white. The BMA and the BMI together were usually referred to locally as the Bermuda Militia. All of the Bermudian reserve units, together with those of the Channel Islands and Malta, were collectively numbered 28th in the British Army's order of precedence, although within that they were ordered by parent corps as per the regular army, making the BMA the senior territorial unit in Bermuda). The BMI commenced preliminary training at St. George's Garrison in November, 1939.

In January, 1940, having completed preliminary training, the BMI moved from St. George's Garrison to Warwick Camp for musketry training before returning to St. George's. In February, one platoon moved to St. David's Battery to replace its BVRC guards. The other remained at St. George's. The training the BMI had been given was judged not satisfactory, however, and the entire company was attached to the King's Shropshire Light Infantry (KSLI) at Prospect Camp in April, 1940, for six weeks of training. The BMI training with the KSLI ended a week earlier than planned due to the unexpected and secretive deployment of the KSLI detachment to the West Indies. The BMI moved from Prospect Camp to St. David's Island on the 24 May 1940, occupying a tent camp with two new hutment buildings, each 60 feet long: one divided into two rooms to provide a dining room and canteen; the other into four rooms containing an office, a Quarter Master Sergeant Stores, an officers' mess, and a Permanent Staff mess. Accommodation was in the tents.

The BMI quickly grew, taking over the entire St. David's area of operation from the BVRC in 1940. Lieutenant JTO Redmond, BVRC, returned to his own unit on handing command of the BMI to Lieutenant WW Fuller, BMI, on the 6 June 1940, and Second-Lieutenant JA Duval was commissioned into the BMI on the same day. In 1941, a platoon was posted near Flatts Village on the Main Island, taking the position over from the Queen's Own Cameron Highlanders. The War Office approved the expansion of the unit to five officers and 120 other ranks in June, 1940 (taking advantage of the introduction of conscription), with two rifle companies. One company was based at St. David's, the other at Prospect Camp. In 1943, the moratorium which had been placed on drafts being sent overseas by the local units was lifted. This moratorium had been put in place following the drafting of a June, 1940 contingent from the BVRC to the Lincolnshire Regiment (a handful of volunteers from the BMA and BVE travelled to England with it, detaching there to join their parent corps). At the time, German naval activity, including commerce raiding by capital ships, posed a significant threat to Bermuda. Although no enemy force could hold Bermuda for long in the face of British naval superiority, there were many inviting targets to attract naval or aerial bombardment, raiding parties, or saboteurs landed from submarines. By the Second World War, in addition to the Royal Naval dockyard and the Cable & Wireless trans-Atlantic cable facilities, Bermuda had gained a Fleet Air Arm air station, RNAS Boaz Island (HMS Malabar), a Royal Air Force base on Darrell's Island, and navigational facilities for trans-Atlantic flight. As during the First World War, it became a forming-up point for trans-Atlantic convoys. To all of this, American and Canadian air and naval bases were soon to be added. Given the importance of Bermuda in the Battle of the Atlantic, it was deemed vitally important that the defences not be weakened by drafts being sent abroad.

=== Overseas Contingent ===
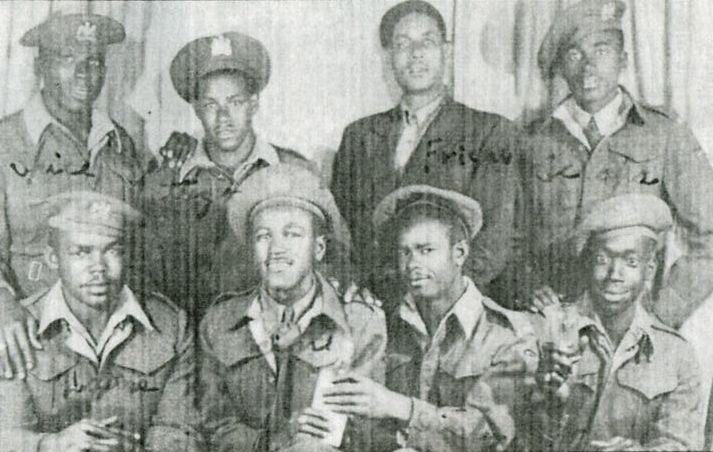
Bermuda Militia Infantry soldiers who served with the Caribbean Regiment.

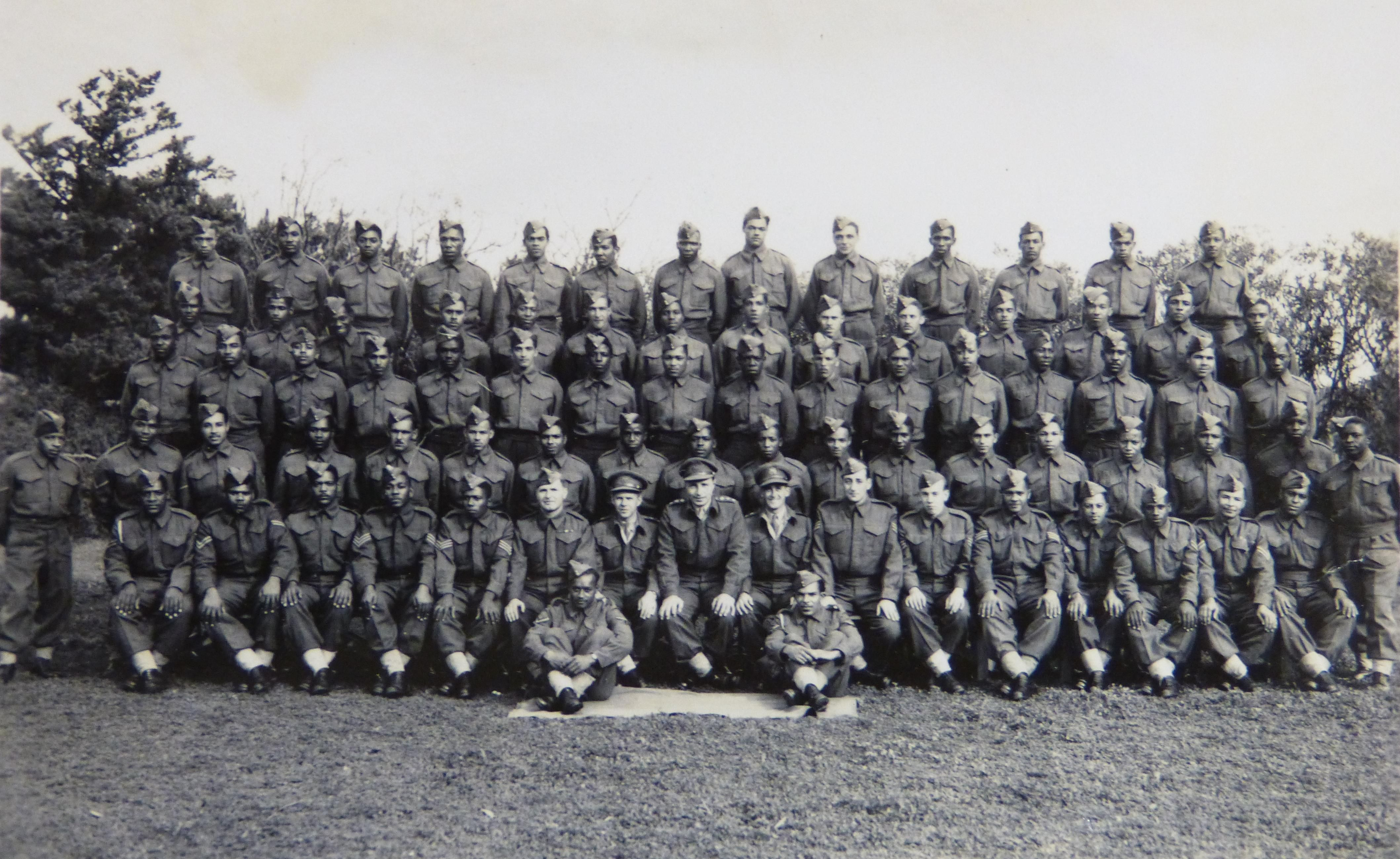
B Company Bermuda Militia Infantry in 1944

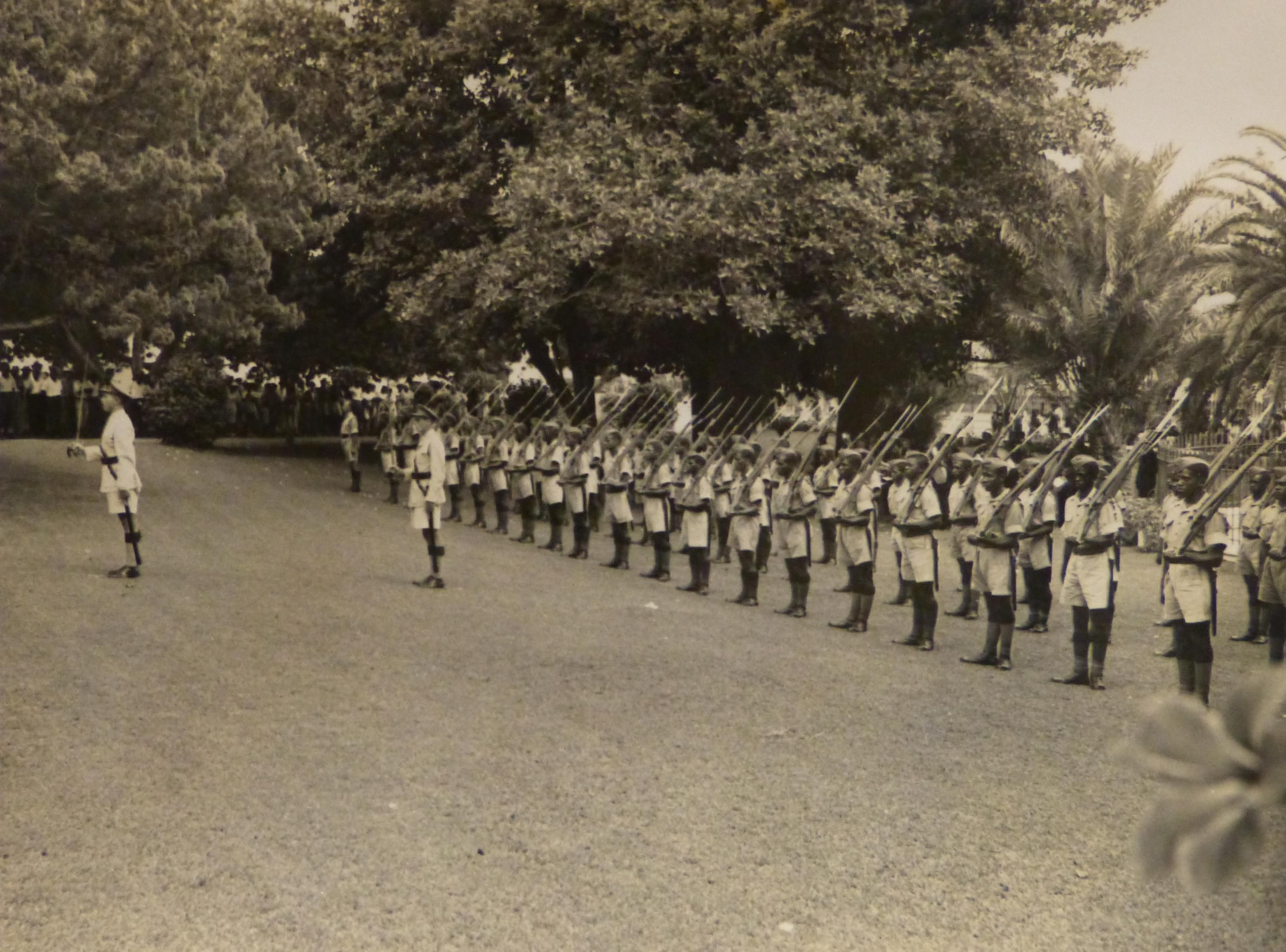
An Honour Guard from B Coy, BMI, parades at the opening of Parliament in 1945

By 1943, with the German navy no longer able to pose a threat to Bermuda, and the buildup of a US Army garrison to protect not just the US bases, but the entire archipelago, the moratorium was no longer needed. Volunteers from the BMI and BMA were formed into a company to serve overseas. This company, numbering 104 officers and enlistedmen, joined with another of volunteers from the BVRC to form the Training Battalion at Prospect Camp, where they were trained for the European Theatre of Operations. In 1944, the two companies separated. The BVRC contingent was sent to the Lincolnshire Regiment in England. The Bermuda Militia contingent was sent to Virginia to form the nucleus of a new regiment, the Caribbean Regiment.

The Bermuda Militia contingent arrived on two ships on the 13th and 23 April 1944, to form the training cadre of the new regiment at Fort Eustis, a US Army base near Williamsburg, Virginia. Under the command of Lt. Colonel H. Wilkin, OBE, MC, they prepared as a training cadre for the arrival of detachments from the West Indian islands, each under its own officers. As most of the West Indians were new recruits, they were tested in Virginia for fitness. Those who had previous training had been prepared for service in the Pacific War. The new regiment numbered 1,200 officers and enlistedmen. The recruits were drawn from all over the British West Indies, mostly from members of local Volunteer Defence Forces. With more experience, and a generally higher degree of education, many of the Bermudian men were made non-commissioned officers and distributed around the regiment. A few officers and non-commissioned officers were also drafted in from British Army units.

The Caribbean Regiment left the USA for Oran, in North Africa, in June, 1944. Oran was handed over to Free French Forces before their arrival, and the Regiment was instead sent to Italy in July 1944, where it was employed in general duties behind the front line. In October it escorted 4000 German prisoners of war from Italy to Egypt, where it was used in mine clearance work around the Suez Canal area.

The BMI was split into A Company, under Officer Commanding Acting (paid) Captain (substantive Lieutenant) J.A Duval, and B Company, under Captain W.W. Fuller, in April, 1943, and based at St. David's Battery and Prospect Camp, respectively. The personnel who had did not go abroad with the Contingent in 1944 were collected together in B Company, which remained based at Prospect Camp, and a new A Company was built up from recruits and based at St. David's Battery. A Company took over the guarding of RAF Darrell's Island in October, 1944. A Guard of Honour was provided by B Company, BMI, for the Opening of Parliament in 1945, the first time this duty had fallen upon one of the local territorials. The same company also provided a guard of honour in 1946. Both guards were commanded by Captain R.W. Evans, the Officer Commanding B Company, BMI.

=== Disbandment ===
The Bermuda Militia contingent returned to Bermuda from Egypt aboard the MT Highland Monarch on 5 January 1946. Soldiers (Sergeants W.H. Outerbridge and H.R. Robinson) from the BMI, along with soldiers from the other Bermudian territorials, marched as a contingent to represent Bermuda in the London Victory Celebrations of 1946, which was to be the final duty for the BMI and BVE. The Contingent left Bermuda on the 10 May 1946, travelling to New York City on a BOAC flight, and onward to England aboard the Queen Mary. It was greeted at Southampton by the city's Mayor. After marching between contingents from Aden and Ceylon in the Victory March on the 8 June 1946, the contingent departed for Bermuda on the 23 June, sailing to Halifax, NS, aboard the Aquitania, and completing the journey via BOAC. The Contingent members were all placed on the Reserve on their return.

The BMI and the BVE, as well as the Home Guard, were all permanently disbanded after the war. "B" Company, BMI, was disbanded on the 27 July 1945, and its personnel absorbed into "A" Company, which was itself disbanded on the 1 March 1946, with its personnel absorbed into the BMA's St. David's Battery. The BMA and the BVRC were both reduced to skeleton staffs with their personnel moved onto the Reserve, but were built back up in 1951 through new recruitment. In 1953, the coastal artillery in Bermuda was removed from use. The BMA converted to the infantry role, but was not retitled, and continued to wear the Royal Artillery uniform and cap badge until 1965, when it was amalgamated with the Bermuda Rifles (as the BVRC had been re-titled) to form the Bermuda Regiment (since 2015, the Royal Bermuda Regiment).

== See also ==
- Military of Bermuda
