= Royal Guards Reserve Regiment =

The Royal Guards Reserve Regiment was a reserve formation of the Household Brigade in existence from 1900 to 1901.

== History and strength ==
Due to the manpower needs of the Second Boer War, several Royal Reserve Regiments were formed from veteran soldiers in the United Kingdom for Home Service. The time expired warrant officers, non commissioned officers and other ranks between the ages of 21 and 45 would enlist for service in the United Kingdom for a period of one year and receive a bounty of £22.

Created in 1900, the one battalion of the Regiment consisted of three officers; a Major (Herbert H. Wigram of the Scots Guards), a Captain (Sir Ralph Barrett MacNaghten Blois of the Scots Guards) and a Lieutenant (Charles Barrington Balfour of the Scots Guards), a Corps of Drums, three companies of the Grenadier Guards, three companies of the Coldstream Guards, and two of the Scots Guards. The Regiment wore the uniforms and hat badges of their previous regiments, but wore a red shoulder strap featuring an embroidered Crown above the word "GUARDS" in an arc with the letters "RR" on the bottom edge.

They were brigaded with the 3rd Battalions of the Coldstream and Scots Guards, and were posted at Wellington Barracks until being transferred to the Tower of London in October 1900.

In addition to performing public duties, the regiment formed a Guard for the Trooping of the Colour in 1900 where it was noted that the three officers had a total service of fifty four years.

The Regiment was disbanded at the end of the Second Boer War along with the other Royal Reserve Regiments.
