= Royal Garrison Regiment =

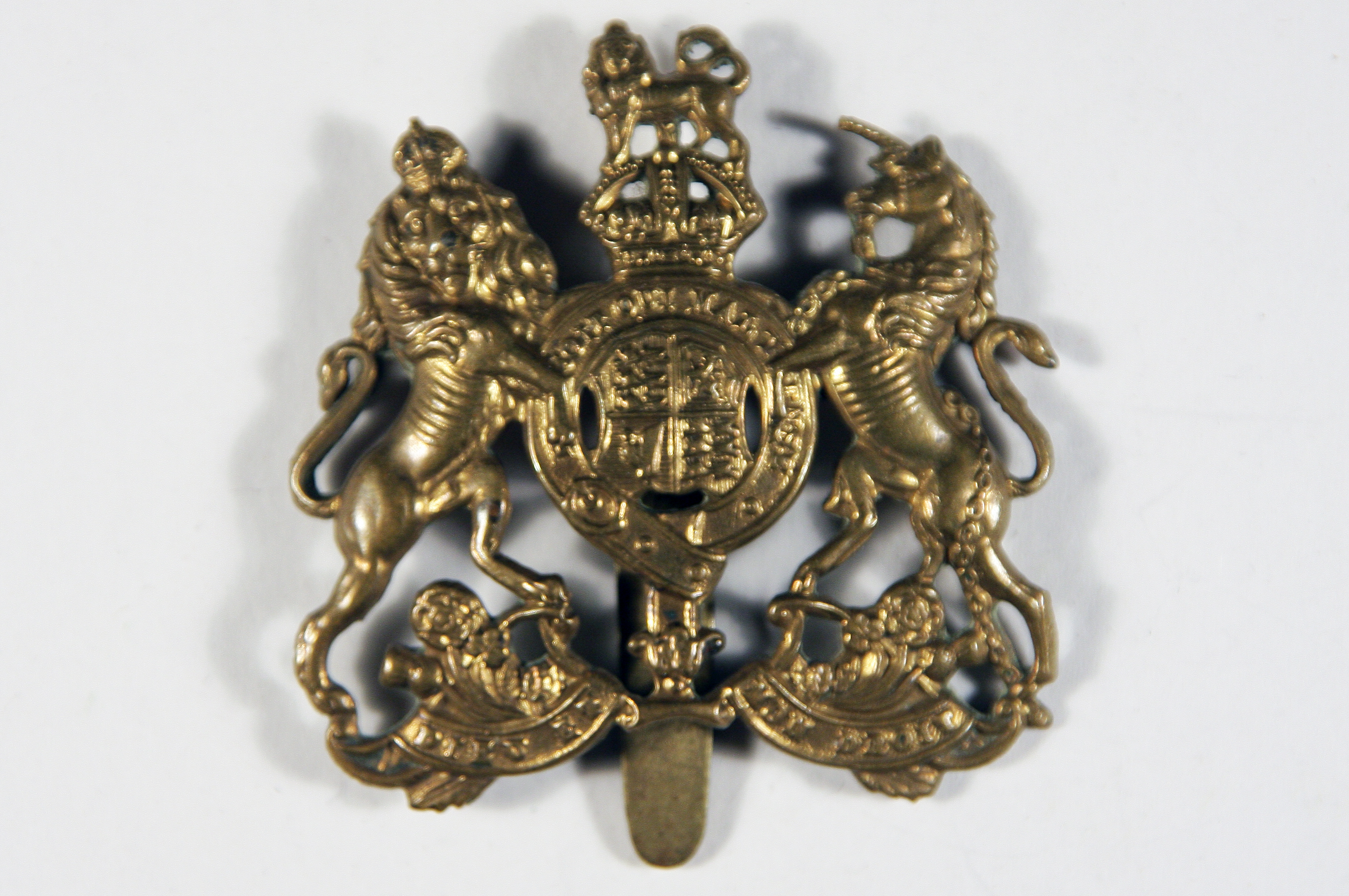
- Capbadge of the Royal Garrison Regiment
- Active: 1901 – August 1908
- Country: United Kingdom
- Branch: British Army
- Type: Infantry
- Role: Relieve regular infantry battalions in overseas garrisons
- Size: Five battalions

The Royal Garrison Regiment was an infantry regiment of the British Army that formed in 1901 and disbanded in 1908.

The regiment was originally formed from personnel of the Royal Reserve Regiments, a reserve force composed of veteran soldiers for home duties in the United Kingdom as a large part of the regular forces were sent to South Africa for service in the Second Boer War. The Reserve Regiments only served in the UK and were phased out in 1901, when the Royal Garrison Regiment was formed. The new units were sent to relieve regular infantry battalions in overseas garrisons; this would allow the regular battalions previously stationed there to be sent on active service in South Africa.

In 1901, four battalions were raised. The 1st, 3rd and 4th battalions were sent to Malta, whilst the 2nd was sent to Gibraltar. In 1904, all four were moved to South Africa for garrison duty there as the regular units returned to normal duties. A fifth battalion was raised in 1902, for service in Canada; it garrisoned Halifax, Nova Scotia from October 1902 until 1905, when it handed over its role to the Permanent Active Militia. It was the last British garrison to be based in Canada proper.

All five battalions were disbanded in 1906-7, and the regiment was disbanded in August 1908.

The cap badge worn by the regiment was the Royal Arms, as used by all British Army regiments and corps for which no unique badge has been authorised, including the General Service Corps, the English regiments of the Royal Reserve Regiments, and the Bermuda Militia Infantry.
