= General Service Corps =

Corps of the British Army

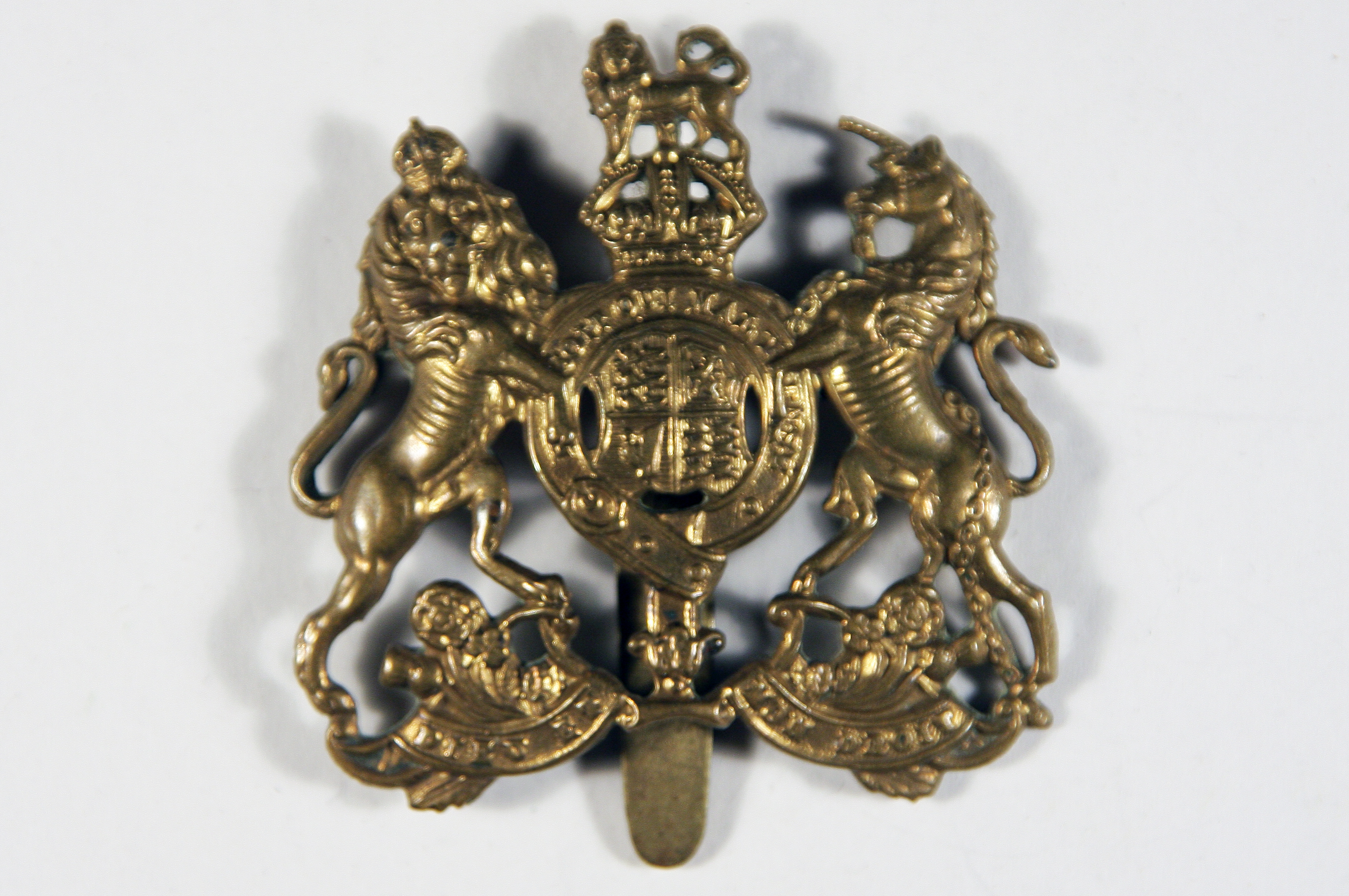
- Cap Badge of the General Service Corps
- Active: 1942–
- Allegiance: United Kingdom
- Branch: British Army
- Role: For specialists, not allocated to a regiment or corps.
- Beret: Dark blue

Insignia
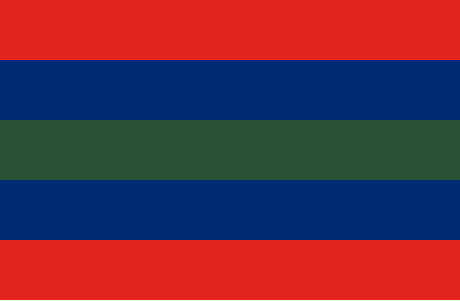
- Tactical recognition flash

The General Service Corps (GSC) is a corps of the British Army.

== Role ==
The role of the corps is to provide specialists, who are usually on the Special List or General List. These lists were used in both World Wars for specialists and those not allocated to other regiments or corps. In World War II, this often included male operatives of the Special Operations Executive (with female operatives usually joining the First Aid Nursing Yeomanry).

== History ==
The General Service Corps itself was formed in February 1942. From 2 July 1942, army recruits were enlisted in the corps for their first six weeks so that their subsequent posting could take account of their skills and the Army's needs. A similar role, holding some recruits pending allocation to their units, continues today. Bermuda Militia Infantry soldiers absorbed into the Bermuda Militia Artillery before demobilisation in 1946 wore the General Service Corps cap badge instead of the Royal Artillery cap badge.

== Insignia ==
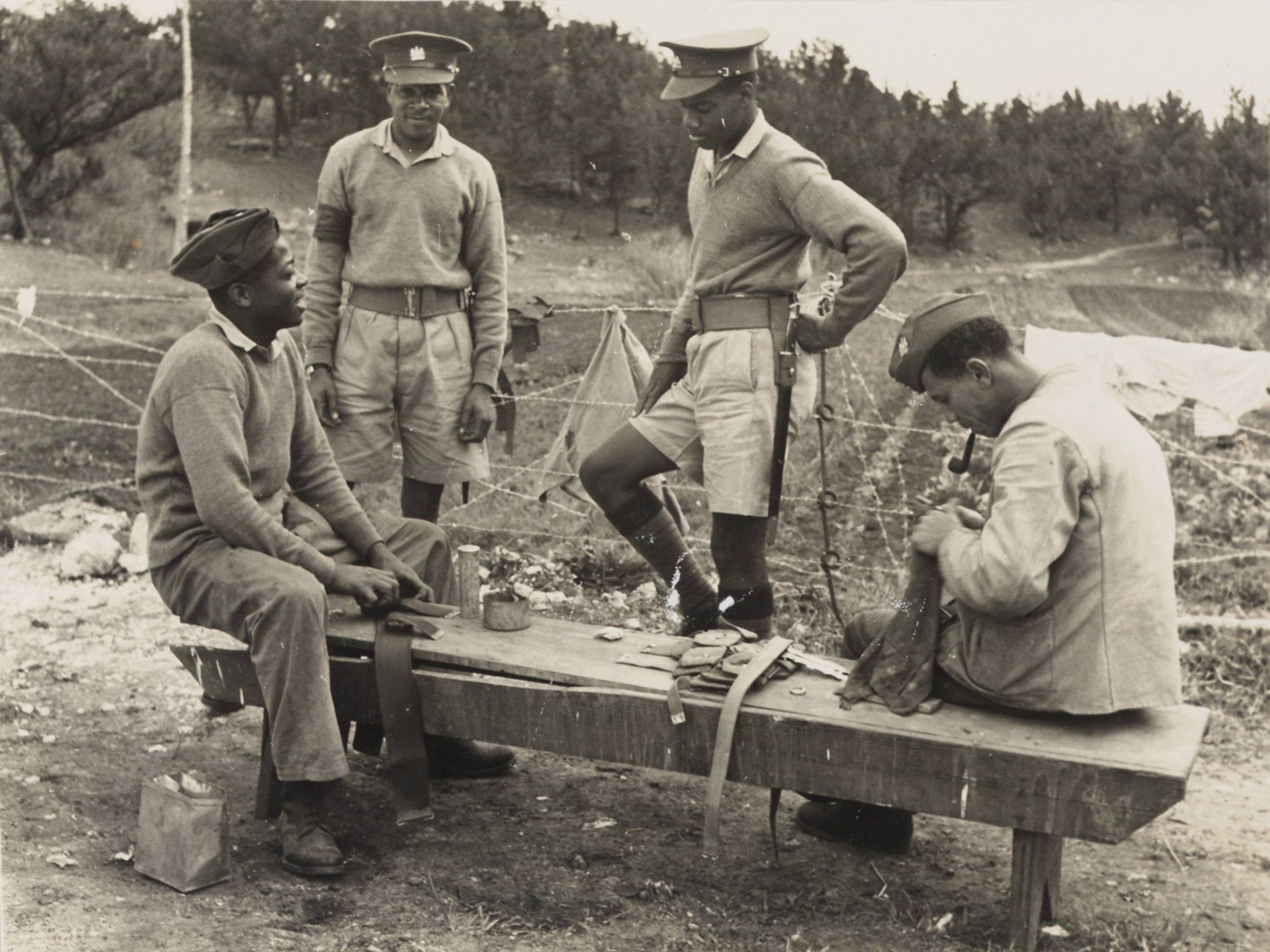
Bermuda Militia Infantry soldiers wearing the General Service Corps cap badge

From 1914, for the General List and later the General Service Corps, the cap badge has been the Royal Arms, with variously a Tudor Crown or St Edward's Crown, depending on the reigning monarch. It bears the motto of the monarch Dieu et mon droit and the Order of the Garter motto Honi soit qui mal y pense. As a result, a GSC nickname was "Crosse and Blackwell" after the firm whose tins and jar labels had a prominent royal coat of arms. The same capbadge has been used for other British Army regiments and corps for which no unique badge has been authorised, including the Royal Reserve Regiments, the later Royal Garrison Regiment, and the Bermuda Militia Infantry.

== Notable personnel ==
Notable members of the General List/General Service Corps include:

- Terence Atherton
- Patrick Leigh Fermor
- Walter Freud
- Peter Lake
- T. E. Lawrence (Lawrence of Arabia)
- Bob Maloubier
- John Pendlebury
- Tracy Philipps
- Arthur Staggs
- Enoch Powell

== Order of precedence ==
The corps is twenty-second in the British Army's order of precedence.

Preceded by Royal Army Physical Training Corps	Order of Precedence	Succeeded by Royal Corps of Army Music
