= Bermuda Volunteer Rifle Corps =

The Bermuda Volunteer Rifle Corps
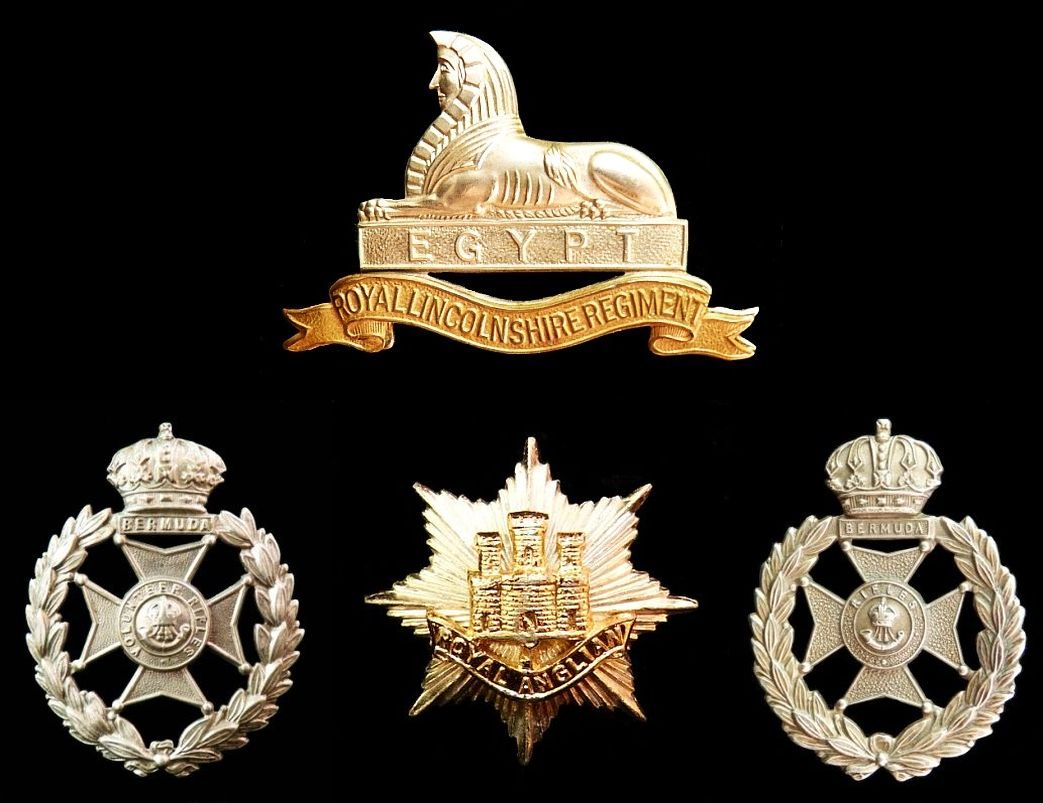
- Badges of the Bermuda Volunteer Rifle Corps (left), the Bermuda Rifles (as the BVRC was retitled between 1951 and 1965, right), the Royal Lincolnshire Regiment (top), and its successor, the Royal Anglian Regiment (bottom-centre)
- Active: 1894–1965
- Country: Bermuda (United Kingdom overseas territory)
- Branch: Army
- Type: Rifle regiment
- Size: Three rifle companies
- Garrison/HQ: Bermuda Garrison

The Bermuda Volunteer Rifle Corps (BVRC) was created in 1894 as a reserve for the Regular Army infantry component of the Bermuda Garrison. Renamed the Bermuda Rifles in 1951, it was amalgamated into the Bermuda Regiment in 1965.

== Formation ==
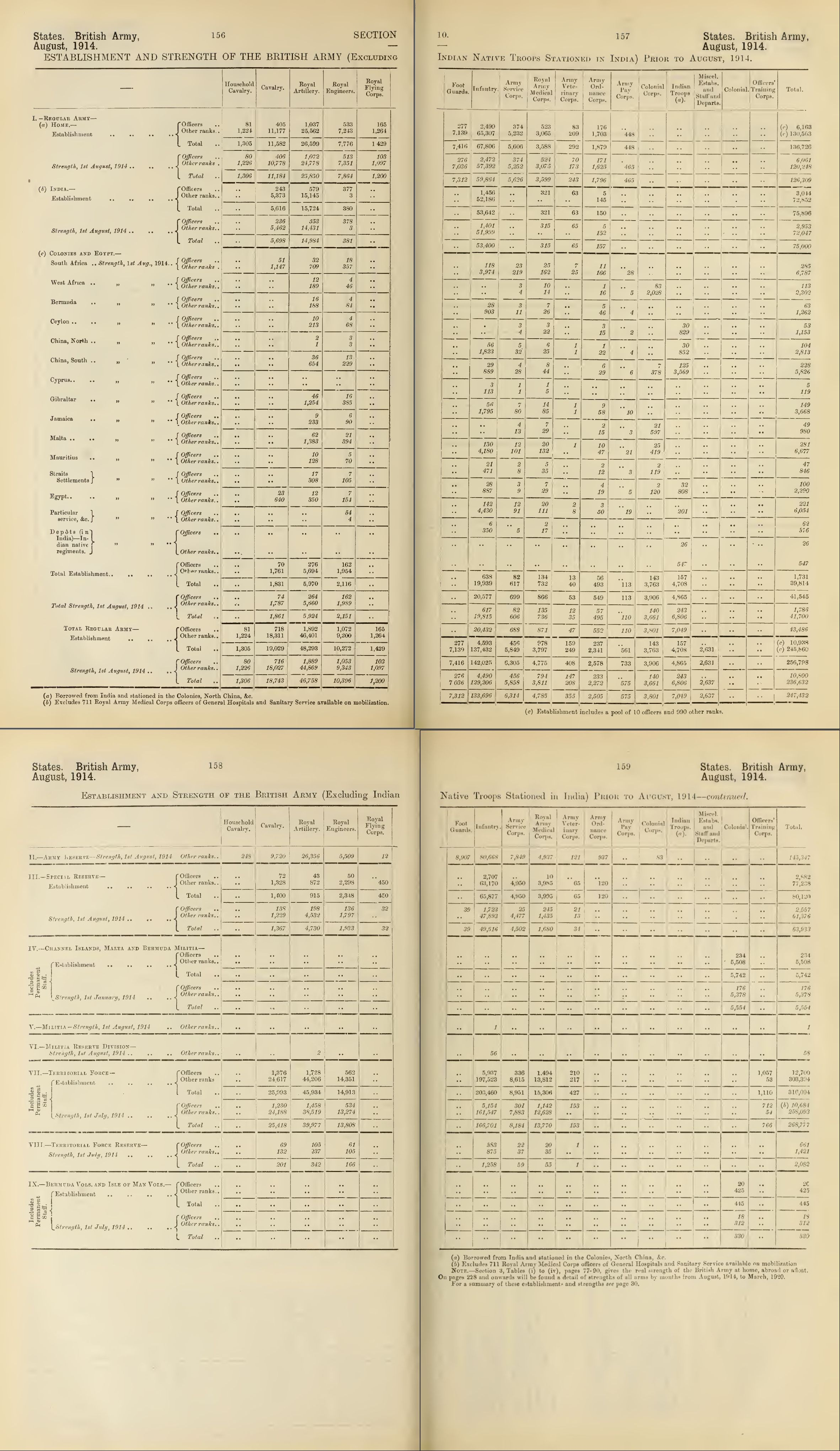
Establishment and Strength of the British Army (excluding Indian native troops stationed in India) prior to August, 1914.

Although Bermuda had maintained its own militia from 1612 until the end of the American War of 1812, it had been allowed to lapse thereafter due to the large garrison of regular soldiers that had been established following US independence. The reason for the military garrison in Bermuda was ultimately the protection of the Royal Naval dockyard on Ireland Island. At the time, the primary defence was seen to be by the coastal artillery, mounted in various batteries and fortifications (and mobile guns stored in gun sheds ready to be rapidly moved to remote locations as required) and manned by the Royal Garrison Artillery (RGA). A voluntary reserve was created for the RGA at the same time, titled the Bermuda Militia Artillery (BMA). If, despite the best efforts of the artillery, enemy vessels succeeded in landing military forces on Bermuda (which was most likely to be achieved using small boats to cross over the reefs to reach beaches on the South Shore), the infantry was expected to tackle them, in the worst scenario, making a fighting withdrawal into the forts and the dockyard itself.

Bermuda Volunteer Rifle Corps cap badge

The BVRC was formed under an act of the Colonial Parliament, passed in 1892. Captain Charles Spencer Brown Evans-Lombe, of the Prince of Wales's Leinster Regiment (Royal Canadians), arrived in November, 1894, to oversee the raising of the Corps, and became the first Adjutant. The BVRC was originally divided into three companies (A, B, and C), one each located in the West End, the centre, and the East End of Bermuda (these being the three military districts into which Bermuda was divided by the garrison, with the districts controlled respectively from Clarence Barracks on Boaz Island, Prospect Camp, and St. George's Garrison, with the overall Command Headquarters at Prospect Camp). BVRC Headquarters was located centrally (initially in the Public Buildings in the City of Hamilton, then in Fort Hamilton, within the south-western part of Prospect Camp), where a fourth Company, D, was added. Twelve officers were appointed, including the Commanding Officer, Major Sir Josiah Rees, three for each of the original three companies, a Surgeon-Lieutenant and a Chaplain. To these were added four Permanent Staff, attached from the Regular Army, including Captain Evans-Lombe, a Regimental Sergeant Major (RSM), and two Non-Commissioned Officers (NCO). The mandated strength of the Corps was 300, all ranks. The lowest rank in the BVRC, as with other rifle regiments, was Rifleman, which was equivalent to a private in a normal infantry regiment (the first rifle regiments had been distinguished from infantry units by their weapons, their tactics, and their green (camouflage) uniforms. When the Enfield rifle replaced the musket as the standard weapon of the British Army, there ceased to be any distinction between the equipment and tactics of the infantry and those of the rifle and light infantry regiments).

Recruitment into the BVRC was restricted to white males, aged 17 to 50, although the barrier to non-whites was achieved by requiring volunteers to be members of a rifle club. All of the private rifle clubs, at the time, restricted their membership to whites. The terms of service for the Bermudian volunteers were similar to those of Volunteers in Britain. Enlistment was voluntary, and a member could leave the Corps by giving fourteen days notice, except while embodied for active service, or training on a military camp-when he also became subject to Military Law. Whereas Volunteers in Britain were originally expected to pay for their uniforms and equipment (including their rifles), Bermudian volunteers were issued these. The uniform was rifle green with black buttons, in conformity with other rifle regiments throughout the Empire, but khaki uniforms were issued from 1898. A minimum attendance at drills, and completion of annual inspection and musketry tests, was required for a volunteer to be returned as 'efficient'. The Corps could be called out in times of War, or in response to an invasion, but volunteers could not be sent overseas without their consent.

== Great War ==
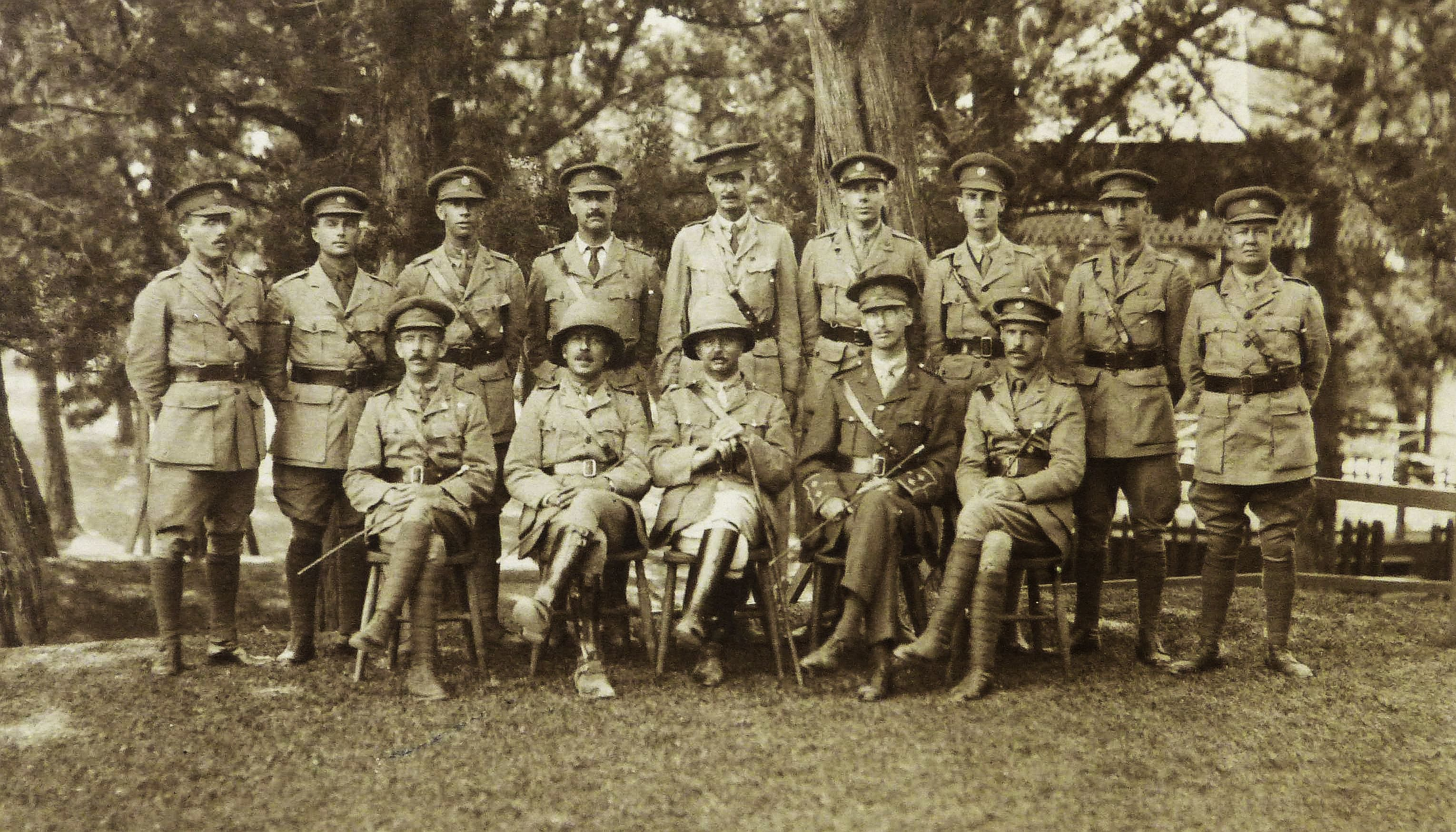
BVRC officers attached to 2/4th Btn East Yorkshire Regiment in 1918

The BVRC continued to train and develop over the next two decades. When war was declared in 1914, it was embodied to fulfill its role within the Garrison. As the economy would have suffered from taking so many young men from their jobs, some soldiers continued to perform their civil jobs, before taking their turns standing sentry at the many places around Bermuda that the BVRC guarded. The primary task the BVRC was given was guarding the coastline but it filled other roles, the most important of which defending the Royal Navy's dockyard on Ireland Island, which was the main base of the North America and West Indies Station of the Royal Navy, and oversaw the formation in Bermudian waters of trans-Atlantic convoys.

=== Overseas contingents ===
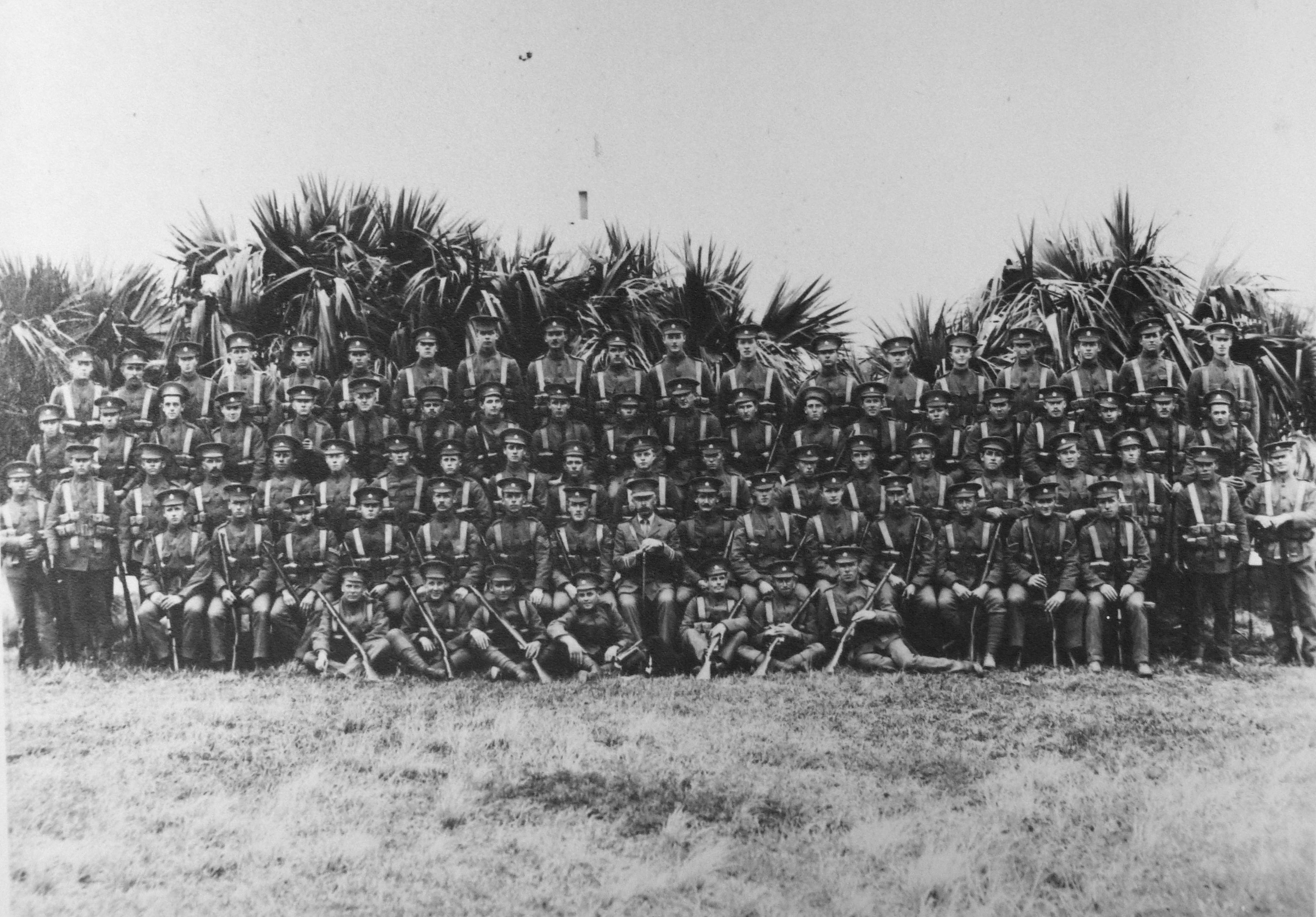
Bullock's Boys. The First Contingent of the BVRC to the Lincolns, training in Bermuda for the Western Front, Winter 1914–15.

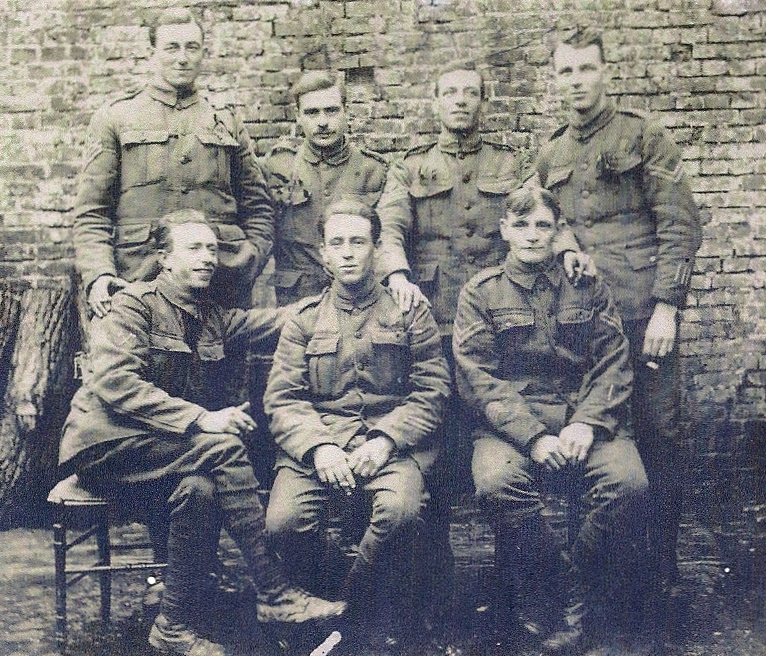
Bermuda Volunteer Rifle Corps soldiers with Lincolnshire Regiment 1918

Despite operating under this constraint, the BVRC quickly formed a detachment in December, 1914, to send overseas to the Western Front. This contingent was composed of volunteers who were already serving, as well as those who enlisted specifically for the Front. The Contingent trained at Warwick Camp through the winter and spring. It consisted of Captain (temporary Major) Richard J. Tucker and 88 other ranks. As there was a shortage of officers, the Governor and Commander-in-Chief, Lieutenant-General Sir George Bullock, filled the role of Adjutant, a position normally filled by a Captain. As a consequence, the contingent was popularly known as Bullock's Boys.

The Contingent left Bermuda for England in June 1915, travelling to Canada, then crossing the Atlantic in company with a much larger Canadian draft. It had been hoped that the Contingent could be attached to the Second Battalion of The Lincolnshire Regiment (2 Lincolns), which had been on Garrison in Bermuda when the War began. When the Contingent arrived at the Lincolns depot in Grimsby, the 2nd Battalion was already in France and it was attached to 3 Lincolns instead (at least one Bermudian, though not from the BVRC, Corporal G.C. Wailes, did serve with the 2nd Lincolns). Although commanders at the Regimental Depot had wanted to break the Contingent apart, re-enlist its members as Lincolns, and distribute them as replacements, a letter from the War Office ensured that they remained together as a unit, under their own badge. The contingent was attached to 1 Lincolns (although its men remained on the strength of 3 Lincolns) as an extra company, and arrived in France in July 1915, the first colonial volunteer unit to reach the Front. The contingent remained as such until the following summer, by when its strength had been too reduced by casualties to compose a full company, having lost 50 percent of its remaining strength at Gueudecourt on 25 September 1916.

The survivors of the First Contingent were merged with a Second Contingent, of one officer and 36 other ranks, who had trained in Bermuda as Vickers machine gunners, which had recently arrived from Bermuda. The Second Contingent was stripped of its Vickers machine guns (which had been collected, in the Army, under a new regiment, the Machine Gun Corps). The merged contingents were retrained as Lewis light machinegunners, and provided 12 gun teams to 1 Lincolns headquarters. By the War's end, the two contingents had lost over 75 percent of their combined strength. Forty had died on active service, one received the O.B.E and six the Military Medal. Sixteen private soldiers from the two contingents were commissioned, including the Sergeant Major of the First Contingent, Colour-Sergeant R. C. Earl, who became Commanding Officer of the BVRC after the war. Some of those commissioned moved to other units in the process, including flying ace Arthur Rowe Spurling and Henry J. Watlington, who both went to the Royal Flying Corps (at least seventeen other Bermudians served the RFC, including another BVRC rifleman, later Major Cecil Montgomery-Moore, who detached from the Corps in Bermuda and earned the Distinguished Flying Cross in France. An NCO from the overseas contingent also transferred to the RFC).

By the end of the war, the BVRC had earned the battle honours Ypres 1915, Neuve Chapelle, Loos, Somme 1916, Ypres 1917, Lys, Hindenburg Line, Messines 1917, Somme 1918. They had not seen the last of warfare, however. In 1918, the 1 Lincolns were withdrawn from France and sent to Ireland to combat the army of the Irish Republic, declared in 1916. The BVRC benefited from Army Order No.1, which increased the pay of most soldiers in the British Army—but that same Order did not benefit the British West Indies Regiment, which was treated as being "native".

== Between the wars ==
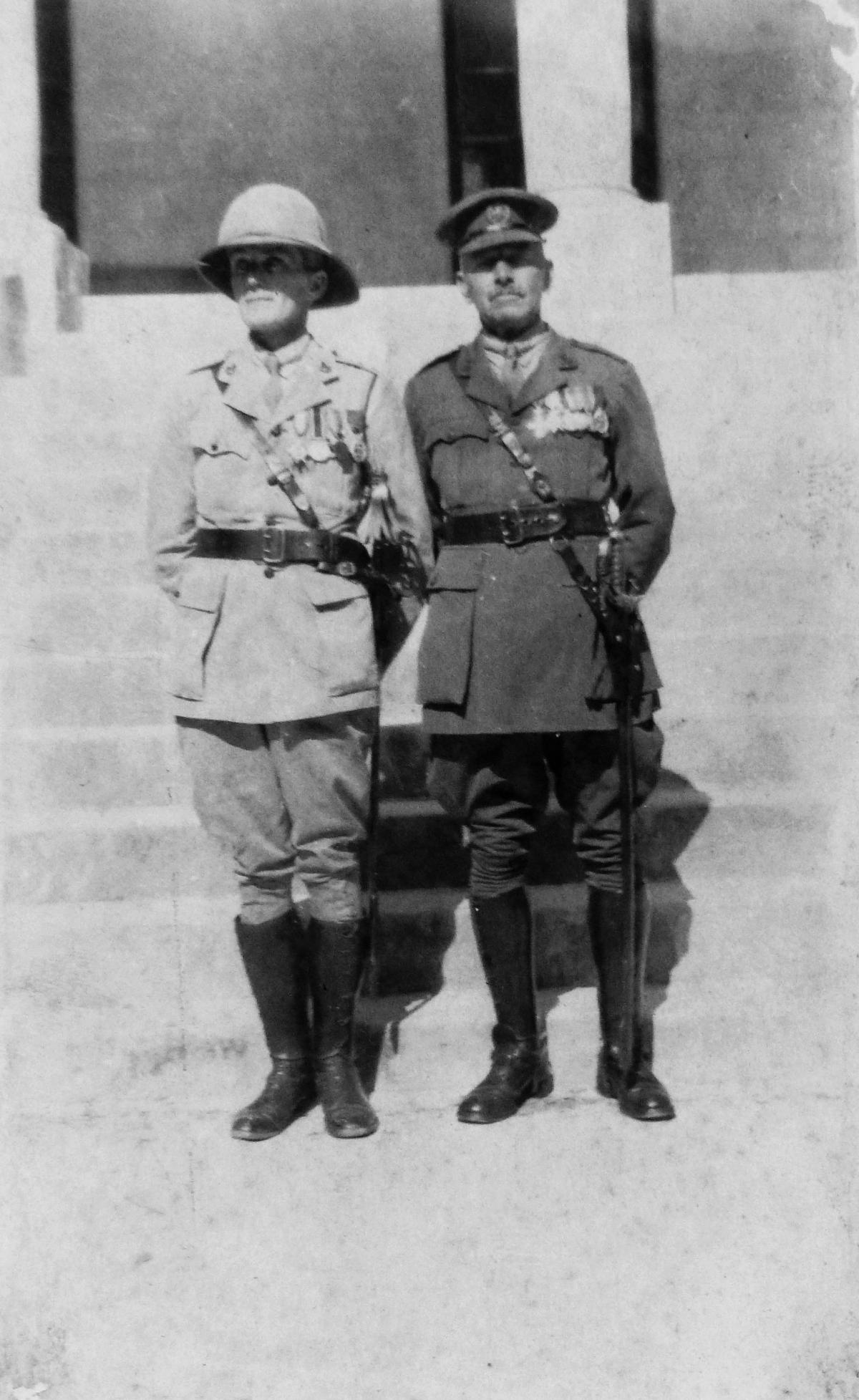
Major RC Earl & Lieutenant-Colonel RJ Tucker, BVRC, on Armistice Day, 1930

At the end of the First World War, both the BVRC and BMA were demobilised and disembodied, though both were soon rebuilt through new recruitment. Many former members of the BVRC re-enlisted. In Britain, the Volunteer Force had been re-organised in 1908, absorbing the remaining militia and Yeomanry units, to form the Territorial Army (TA). Among other changes, the TA introduced terms of service. A volunteer could no longer quit with fourteen days notice, but had to complete the term for which he was enlisted, as was the case for professional soldiers in the British Army.

The re-embodied BVRC was re-organised as a Territorial, although it remained nominally a Volunteer unit. Its association with the Lincolnshire Regiment was made official, with the Lincolns taking on the paternal role it played with its own Territorial battalions. A third local Territorial, the Bermuda Volunteer Engineers (BVE), was formed in 1931 to man Defence Electric Lights at coastal batteries, and absorbed the signals section of the BVRC a decade later.

The Regular Army artillery and engineering detachments to the garrison were withdrawn in 1928, with the BMA and BVE, respectively, assuming complete responsibility for their vacated roles. There would no longer be a full infantry battalion in Bermuda. Instead, a detached company would be provided from the battalion sent to Jamaica.

== Second World War ==
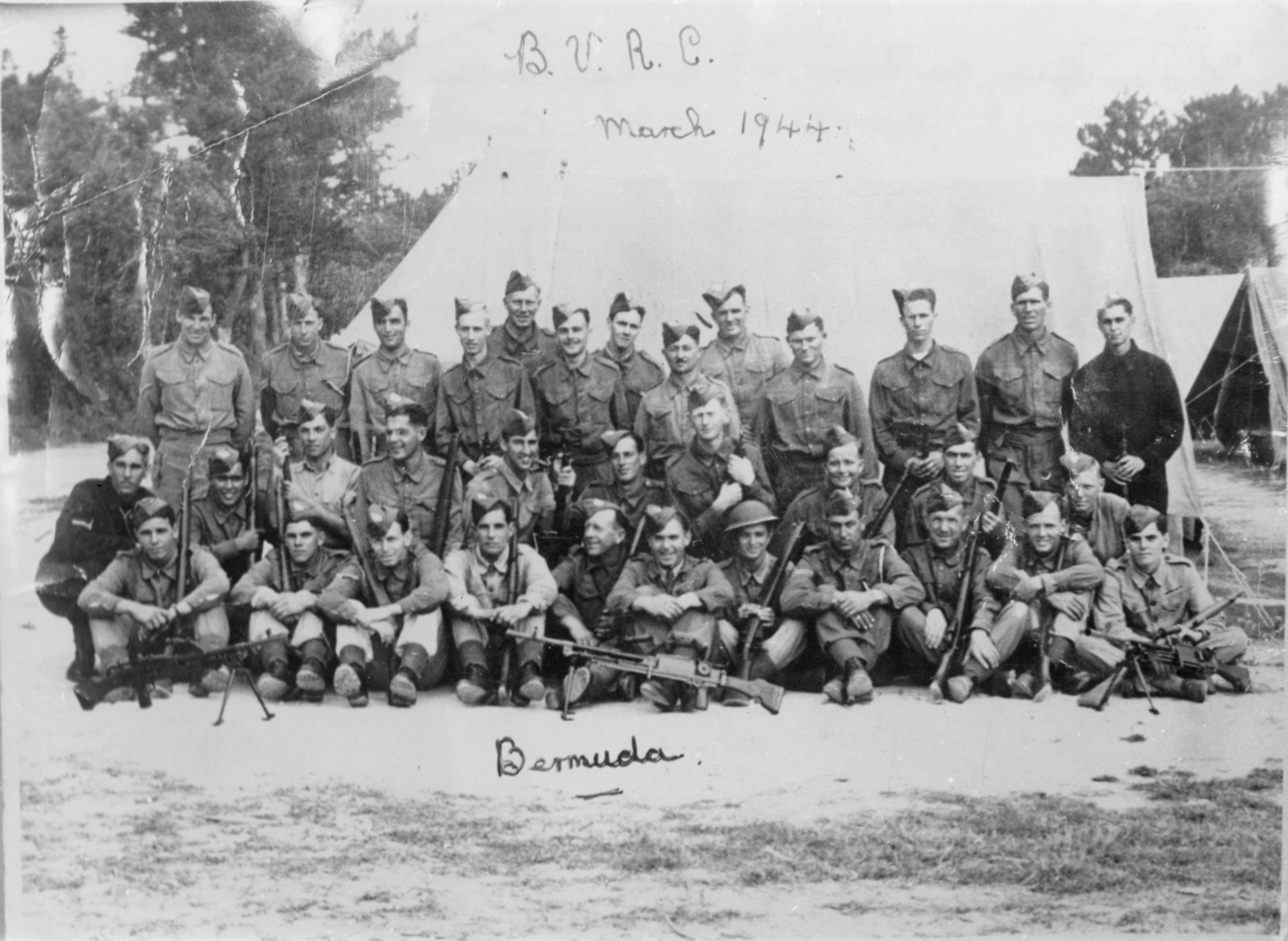
BVRC platoon in March 1944

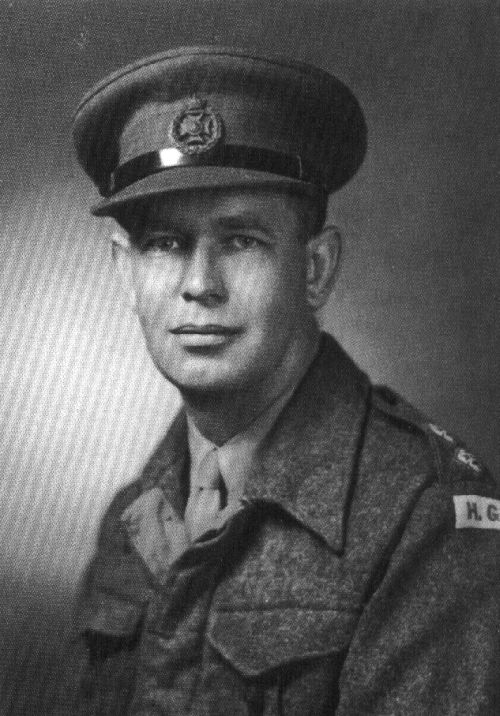
Lieutenant Percy Reginald Tucker of the Bermuda Home Guard and BVRC

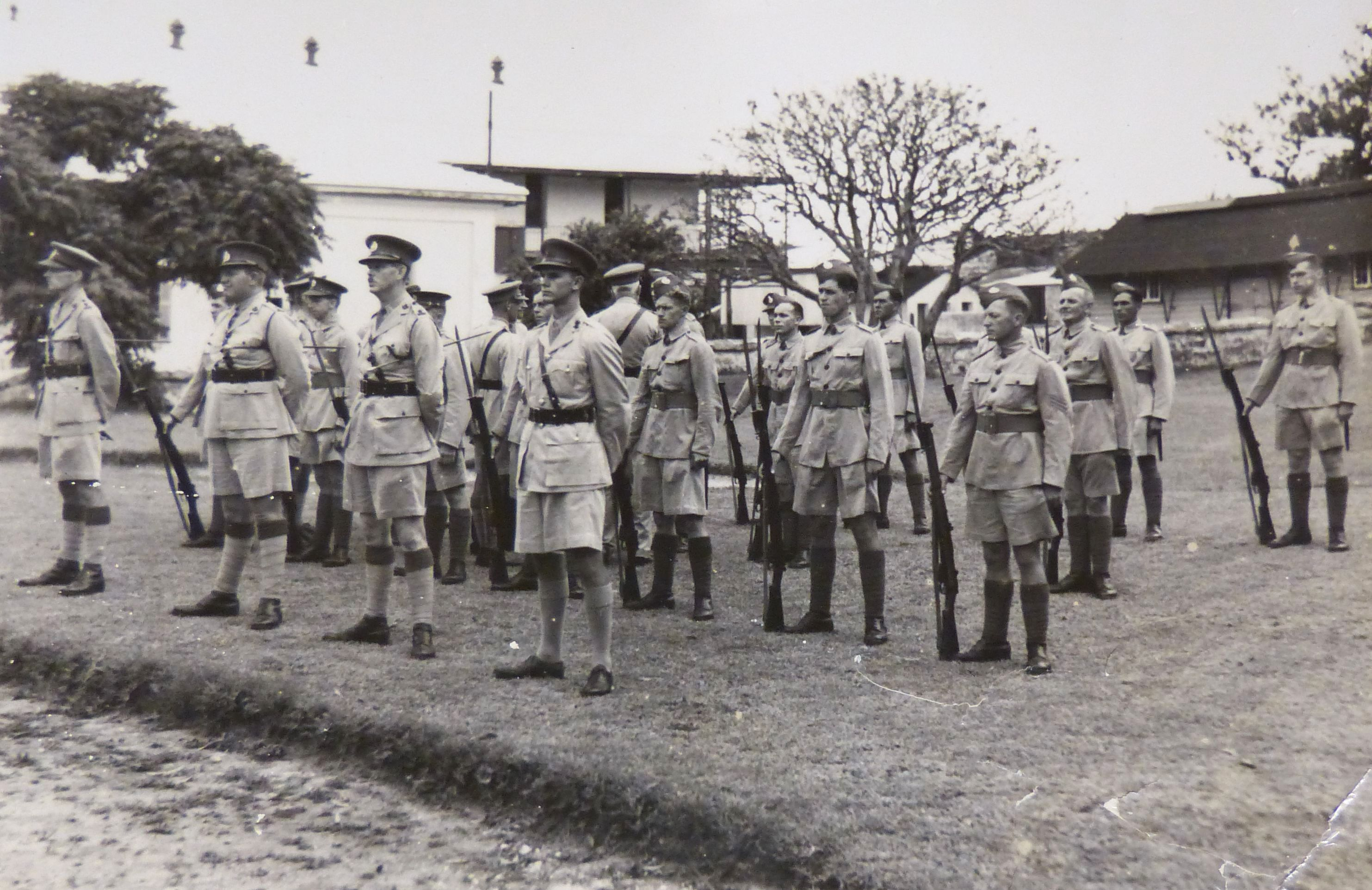
Governor and General Officer Commanding, Lieutenant-General Sir Denis Bernard, inspects the First BVRC Contingent to the Lincolnshire Regiment at Prospect Camp on 22 June 1940.

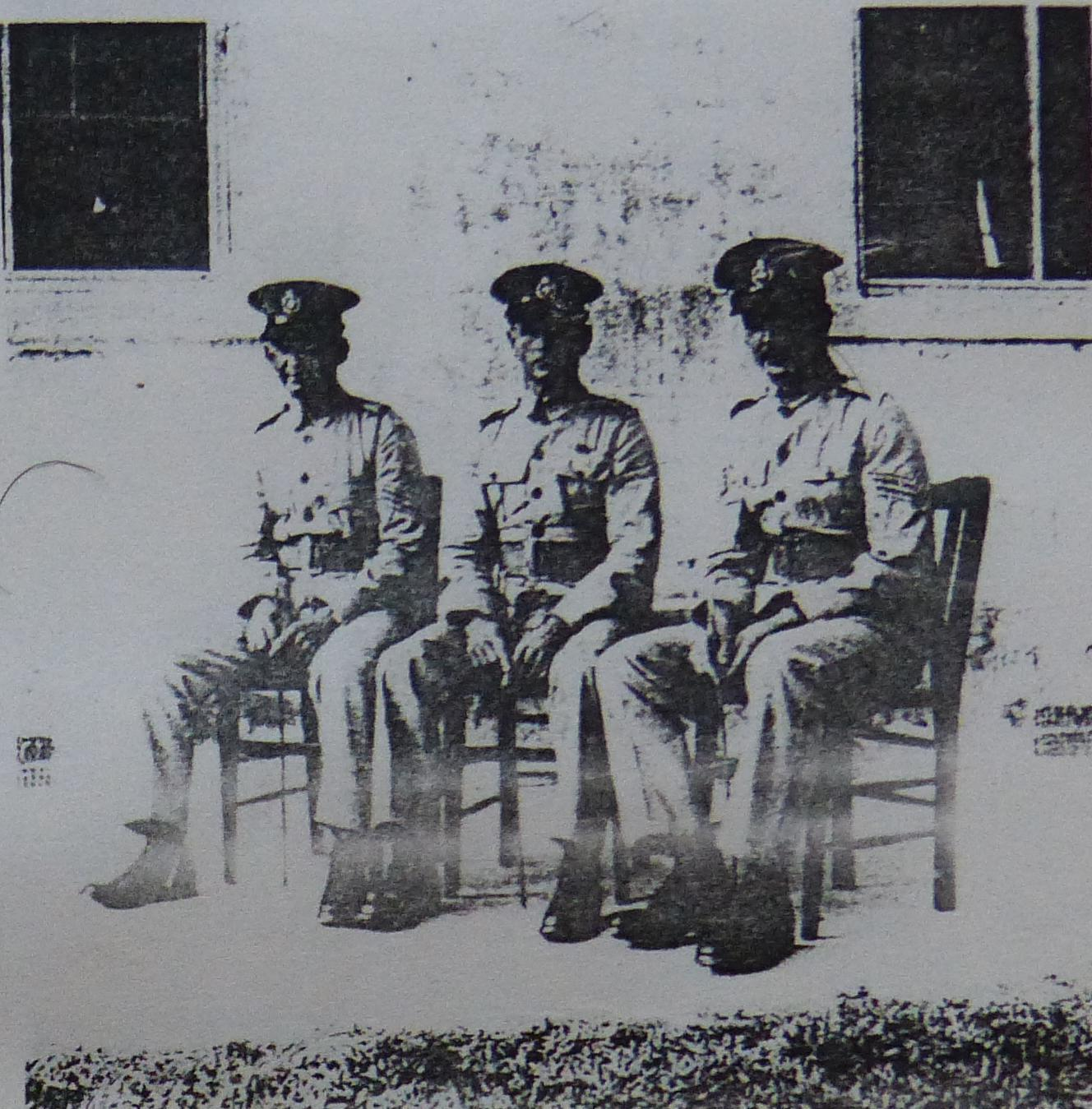
Three BVRC senior NCOs, including 683 Sergeant Edward A. Lee (right), later a CSM of the Caribbean Regiment.

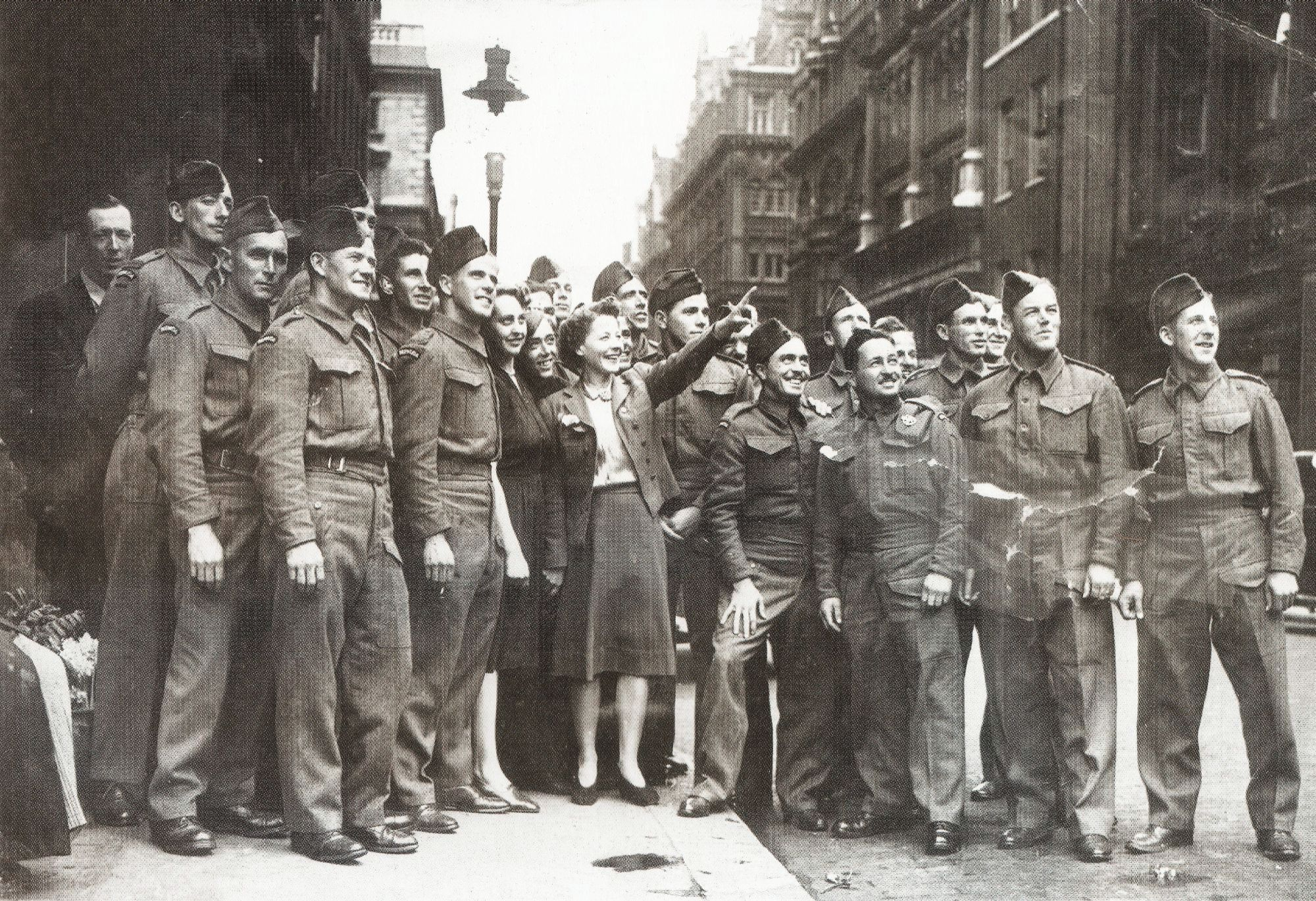
BVRC soldiers serving with the Lincolnshire Regiment, circa 1944

The BVRC began mobilisation on 3 September 1939, even before news was received of the declaration of war, when Britain issued Germany with an ultimatum to withdraw from Poland. As in the previous war, it took up positions guarding the coastlines, but its duties soon grew more numerous. Members of the Territorials were called up for the duration, and conscription was introduced to increase their strengths in October, 1940. Another infantry unit, the Bermuda Militia Infantry, had been raised in October, 1939, recruiting blacks, and linked administratively with the BMA. The infantry duties of the Garrison were split between these two Territorials, and the detachment from the 2nd Battalion, King's Shropshire Light Infantry (KSLI) at Prospect Camp.

Also as in the previous war, a Contingent was soon detached, composed of volunteers for service at sharper ends of the War. A few members of the BVE and the BMA travelled with this contingent to England (departing Bermuda in June, 1940), where the BVRC members were re-enlisted into the Lincolnshire Regiment. This Contingent included two officers, Robert Brownlow-Tucker and Anthony 'Toby' Smith, who became Company Commanders in the Lincolns before the War's end. They were among four Bermudians who would reach the rank of Major with the Lincolns (although one, future Major-General Glyn Charles Anglim Gilbert, MC, never served in the BVRC, and the last, Major Patrick Lynn Purcell, had left Bermuda as a BMA Lieutenant attached to the 1940 BVRC Contingent. After coastal artillery service in Sierra Leone, he had transferred from the Royal Artillery to the Lincolnshire Regiment). Additionally, one member of the 1940 contingent from the Bermuda Volunteer Rifle Corps was Bernard John Abbott, a school teacher and pre-war Bermuda Cadet Corps officer who had been re-commissioned into the Bermuda Volunteer Rifle Corps’ Emergency Reserve of officers with the rank of Second-Lieutenant (Acting Major) in accordance with a War Office cable of the 4 May 1939, before volunteering to serve overseas. He was assigned to 50th Holding Battalion, in Norfolk, which became 8th Battalion, Lincolnshire Regiment. He ended the war as a staff officer in the Far East, and the London Gazette of 25 December 1945 recorded “War Subs. Maj. H. J. ABBOTT .(108051) relinquishes his commn., 26th Dec. 1945, and is granted the hon. rank of Lt.-Col.”.

Due to fears of stripping the Garrison, a moratorium was placed on further drafts being sent overseas from Bermudian units. This moratorium was not lifted until 1943, when both the BVRC and the Bermuda Militia (the BMI and BMA together) detached contingents to send overseas. The two contingents trained together at Prospect Camp, before going their separate ways. The BVRC left Bermuda in May, 1944, to join the Lincolns in England. The contingent members were rebadged as Lincolns, and most joined 2 Lincolns in Belgium, as the Allies advanced into North-West Europe. They had travelled as part of a Company of reinforcements under the command of Bermudian Major AF 'Toby' Smith, who was killed-in-action shortly after, along with three other Bermudians. While in England, eleven of second contingent had volunteered to join the Airborne Division, training as parachutists.

== Post-Second World War ==
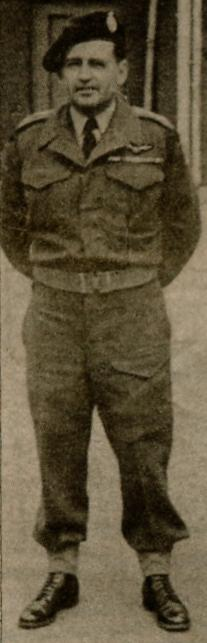
Bermuda Rifles 2-i-C Captain RM Gorham DFC at 1953 Coronation

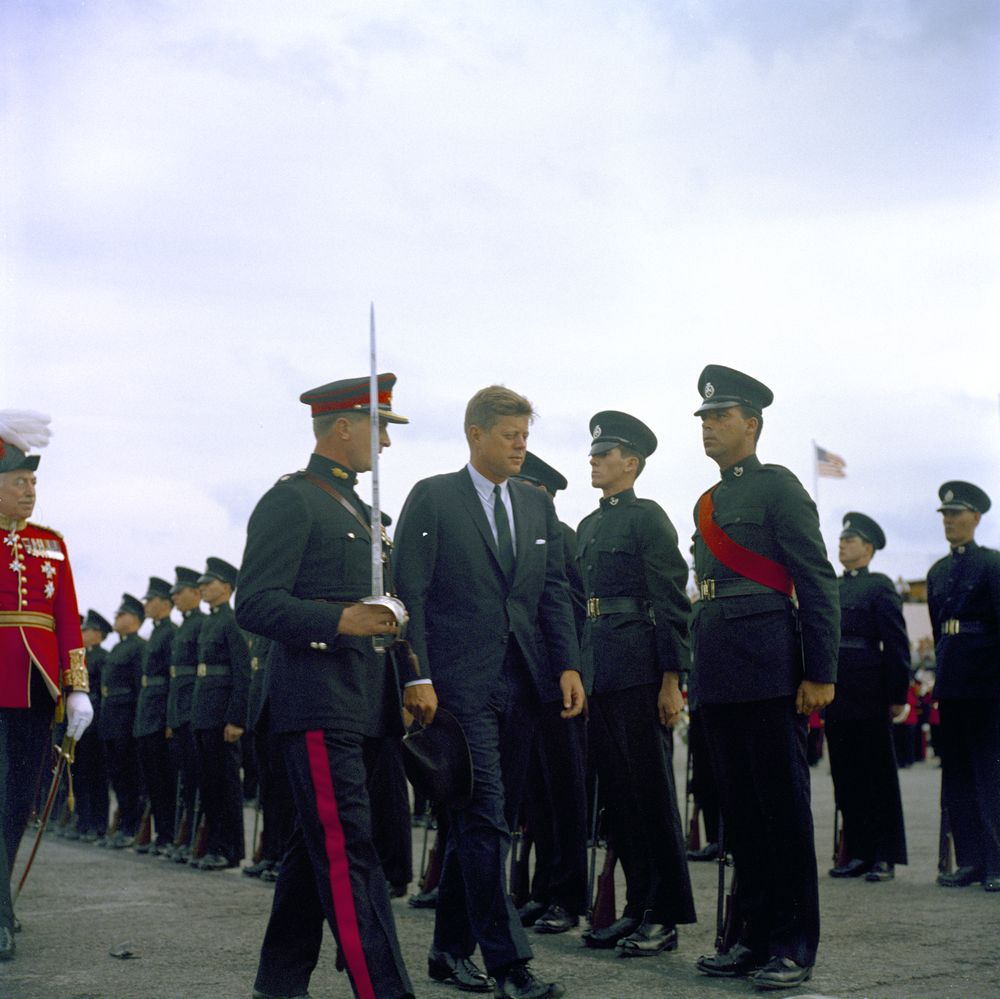
US President JF Kennedy with BMA officer inspects Bermuda Rifles in 1961

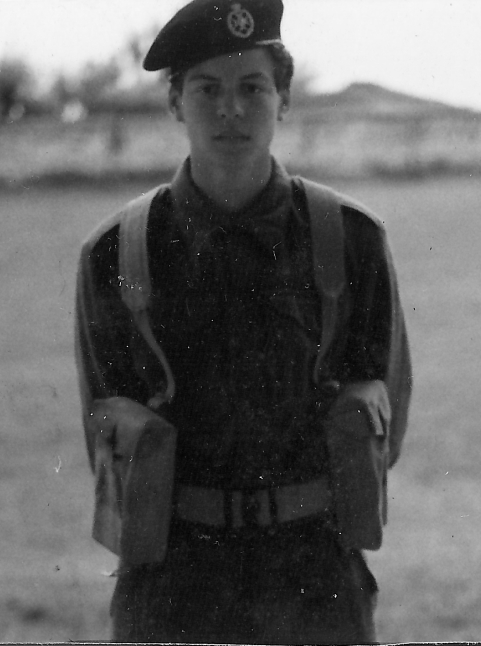
Battle Dress was the standard field uniform for Bermudian Territorials from the 1940s to the 1960s, but tropical dress was worn in the summer months.

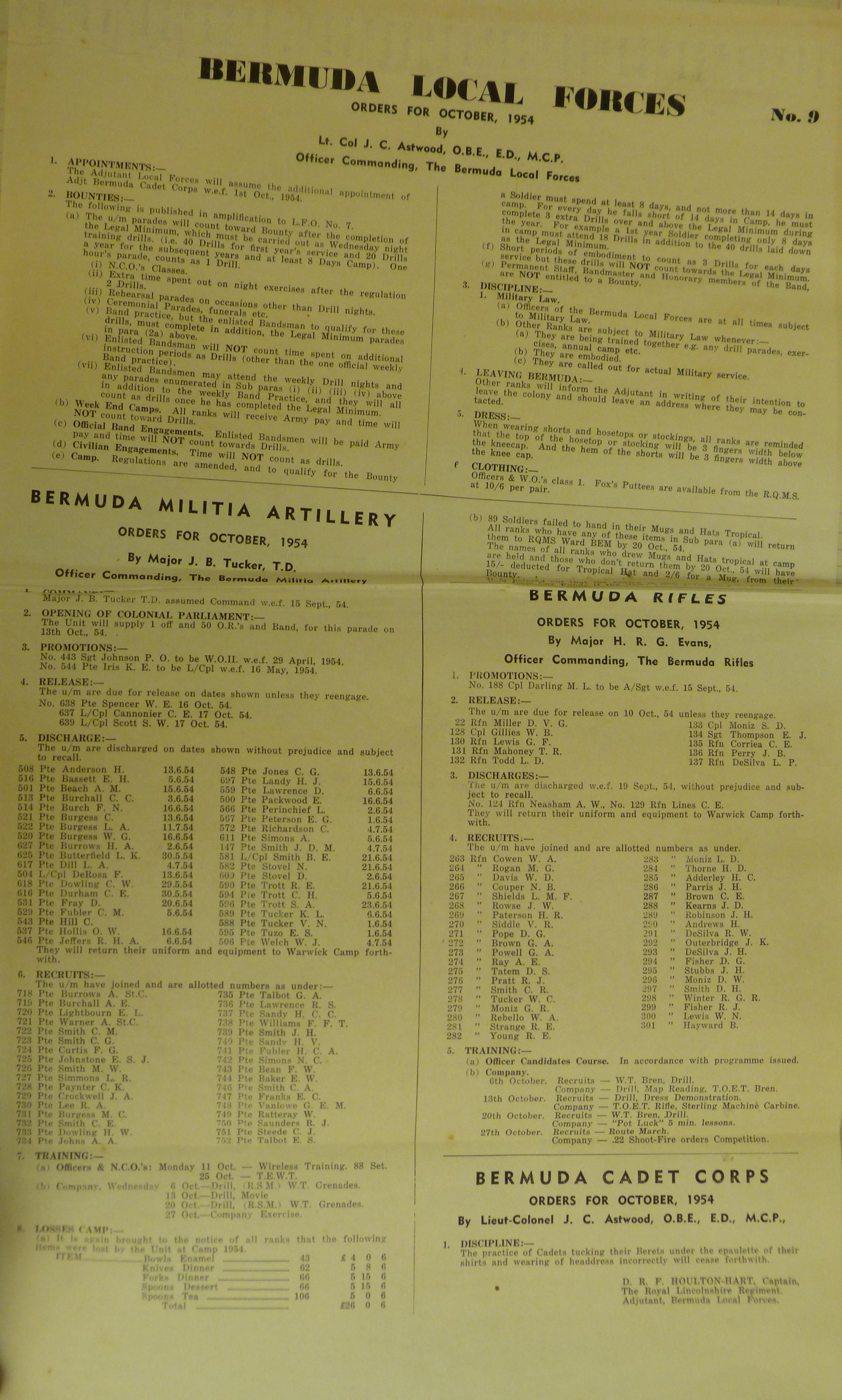
Bermuda Local Forces Orders, October, 1954

After the War, the BVRC men, who had travelled to Europe as units, returned individually, as each waited for his 'number' to come up. The BVRC and the BMA sent contingents to the Victory Parade in London. In 1946, however, both units were demobilised and reduced to skeleton command structures. The other two Territorials were both disbanded, but the BVRC and BMA were brought back up to strength in 1953. At that time, the BVRC was retitled the Bermuda Rifles. The loss of the word 'volunteer' was probably prudent, as conscription was re-introduced to both units. In 1953, it was announced that the HM Dockyard would be closed. This meant that the military garrison, which had existed primarily to guard the naval base, would be closed, also. The last Regular Army unit (a detachment of the Duke of Cornwall's Light Infantry) was withdrawn by 1955, and the Dockyard closed in 1958. 1953 was also the last year of the Imperial Defence Plan, under which the Bermudian units had been tasked, and the year in which the last of the coastal artillery was taken out of use. The BMA, while still wearing Royal Artillery uniform and cap badge, converted to the infantry role. With no tasking under the War Office, and its successor, the Ministry of Defence, or under NATO, both units might have been disbanded, but the Bermuda Government, for reasons of its own, chose to maintain them entirely at its own expense.

A new role began to appear as Bermuda moved into the 1960s, when increasing tension resulting from the racial division and inequity of Bermudian society occasionally spilled over into violence. By then, it was rapidly becoming politically, as well as economically, inexpedient to maintain two, racially divided infantry units. As a result, the Bermuda Rifles and the Bermuda Militia Artillery were amalgamated in September, 1965, to form the Bermuda Regiment (now the Royal Bermuda Regiment).

The Royal Bermuda Regiment badge is a combination of the Maltese Cross of the BVRC badge, and the field gun of the Royal Artillery badge. The unit maintains the history and traditions of both of its predecessors (it continues to wear the rifle green and black stable belt of the BVRC, and the red tunics worn by its drummers on ceremonial duties have black facings). However the Battle Honors of the BVRC were not passed on. This is due to the stand down between 1946 and 1948. Attempts to rectify this have not been successful due to strict British Army policies in regards to those honors.

Originally, the part-time reserve units in Bermuda, the Channel Islands and Malta had numbered collectively as 28th in the British Army order of precedence, but were ordered within that according to the placement of their parent corps in the regular army. This meant, that the Bermuda Militia Artillery (BMA), as part of the Royal Regiment of Artillery, preceded the Bermuda Volunteer Rifle Corps (BVRC) despite being the second of the two to be raised. Today, the Bermuda Regiment (since 2015, titled the Royal Bermuda Regiment), as an amalgam of the BMA and BVRC, is 28th.

== Gallery ==
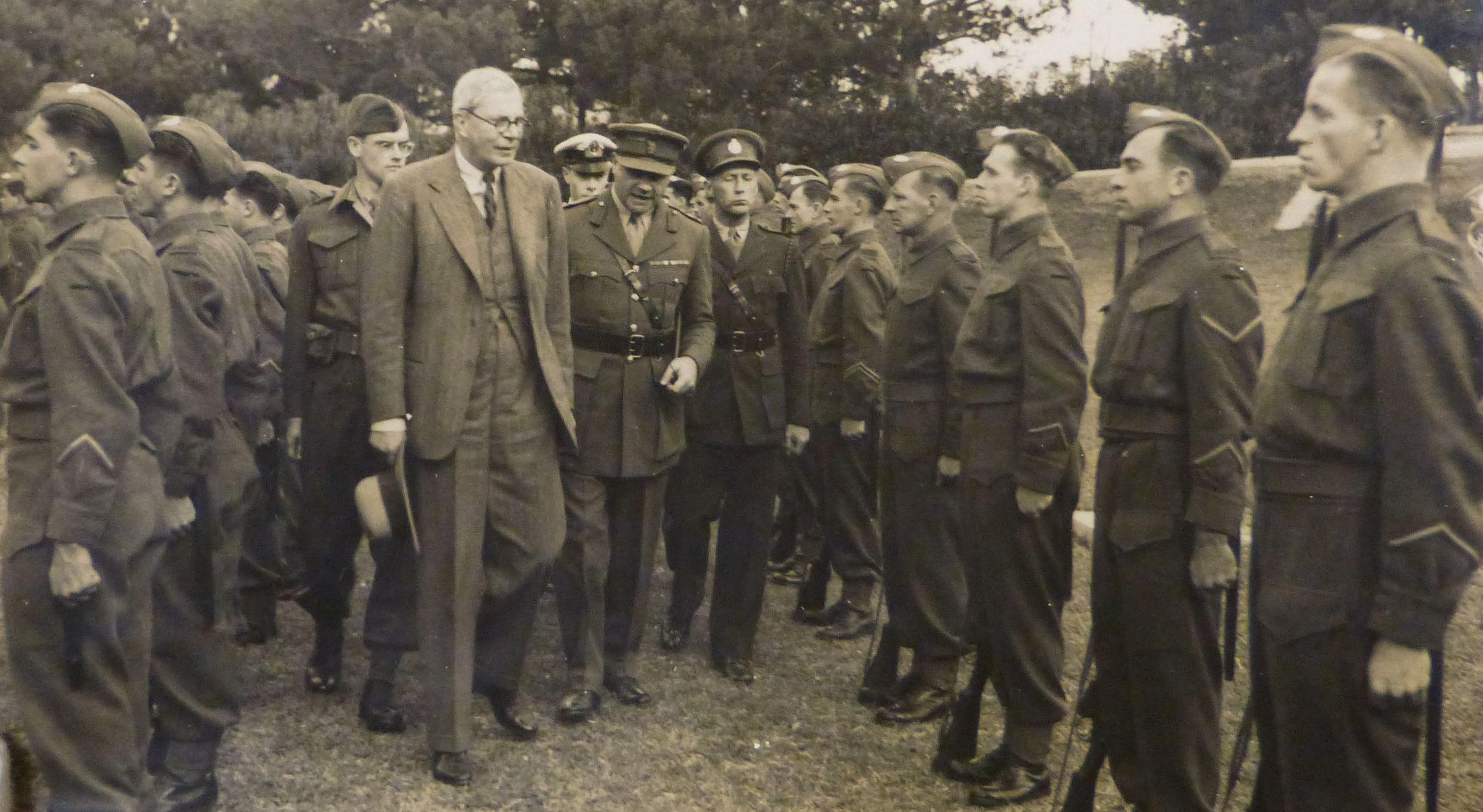
Secretary of State for the Colonies Oliver Stanley inspects a BVRC honour guard at the Prospect Camp on 30 December 1944.

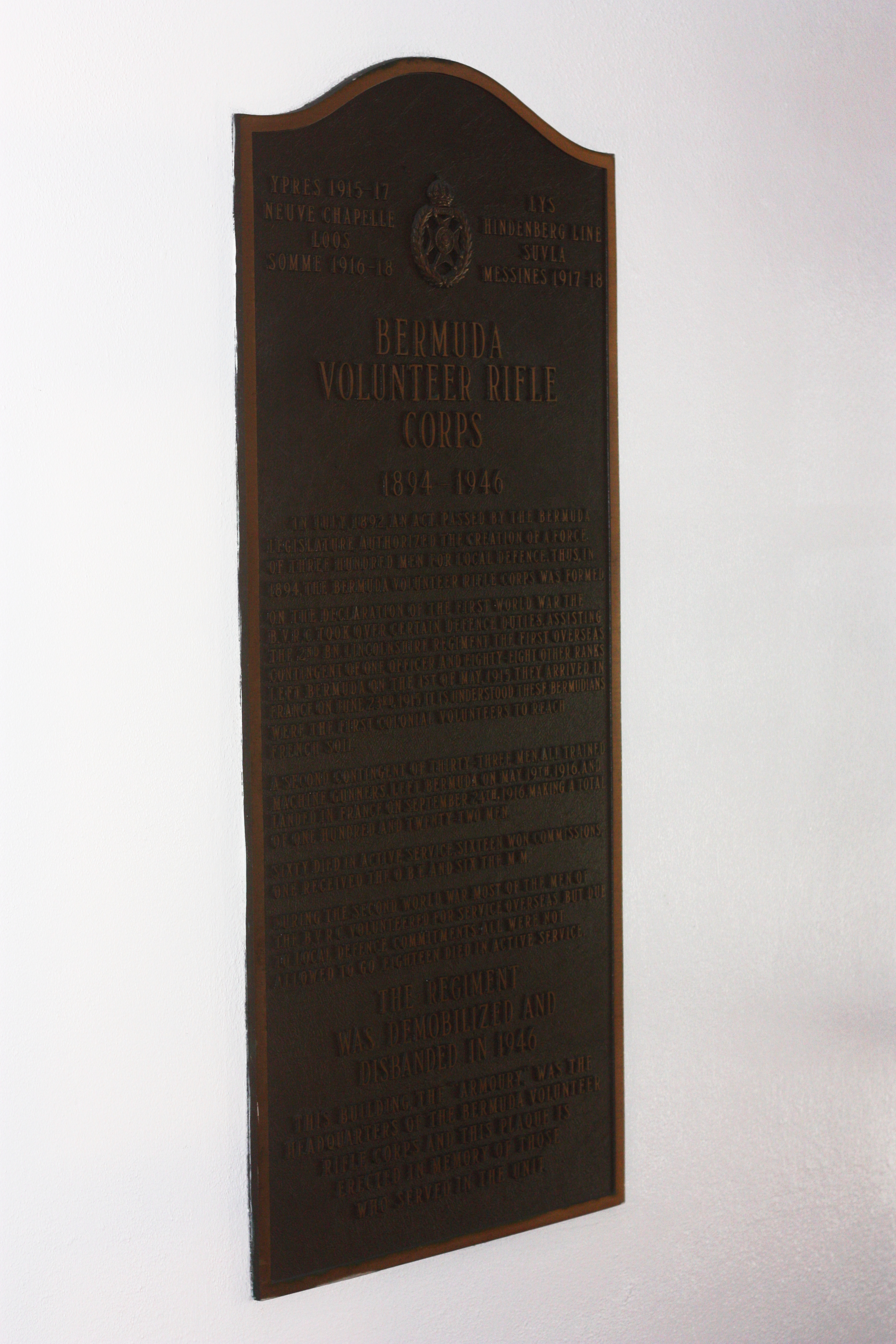
Plaque at Hamilton Armoury commemorating BVRC service from 1894 to 1946.

== See also ==
- Bermuda Garrison
- Bermuda Militias 1612-1815
- Volunteer Force (Great Britain)
- British Army

== Bibliography ==
- "Defence, Not Defiance: A History Of The Bermuda Volunteer Rifle Corps", Jennifer M. Ingham (now Jennifer M. Hind), ISBN 0-9696517-1-6. Printed by The Island Press Ltd., Pembroke, Bermuda.
- "Bermuda Forts 1612–1957", Dr. Edward C. Harris, The Bermuda Maritime Museum Press, The Bermuda Maritime Museum, P.O. Box MA 133, Mangrove Bay, Bermuda MA BX.
- "Bulwark Of Empire: Bermuda's Fortified Naval Base 1860-1920", Lt.-Col. Roger Willock, USMC, The Bermuda Maritime Museum Press, The Bermuda Maritime Museum, P.O. Box MA 133, Mangrove Bay, Bermuda MA BX.
- "Flying Boats Of Bermuda", Sqn.-Ldr. Colin A. Pomeroy, ISBN 0-9698332-4-5, Printlink, PO Box 937, Hamilton, Bermuda HM DX.
- "Bermuda From Sail To Steam: The History Of The Island From 1784 to 1901", Dr. Henry Wilkinson, Oxford University Press, Great Clarendon Street, Oxford, UK OX2 6DP.
